= Kaliningrad =

City in Kaliningrad Oblast, Russia

Kaliningrad Калининград Königsberg
- City
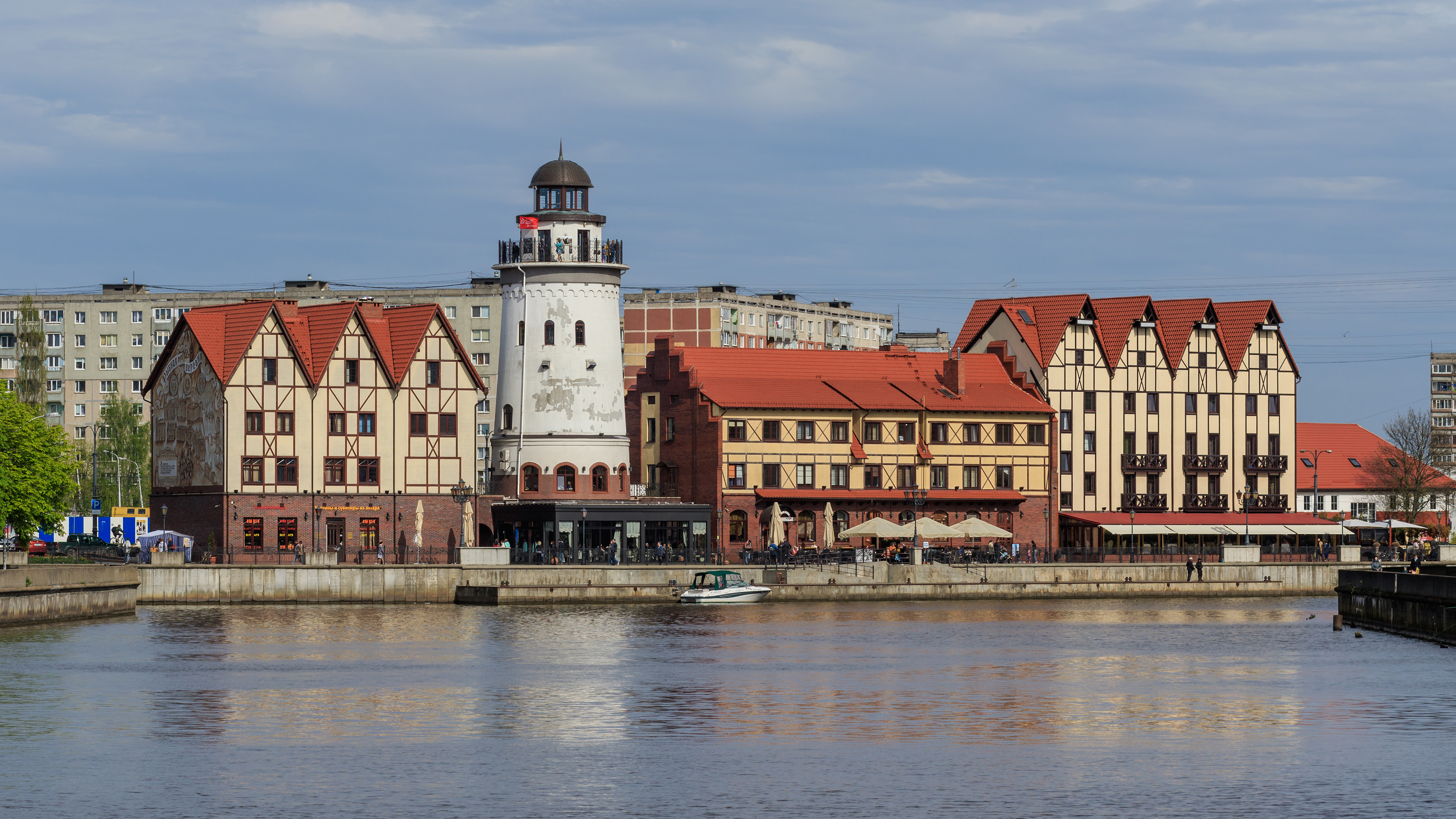
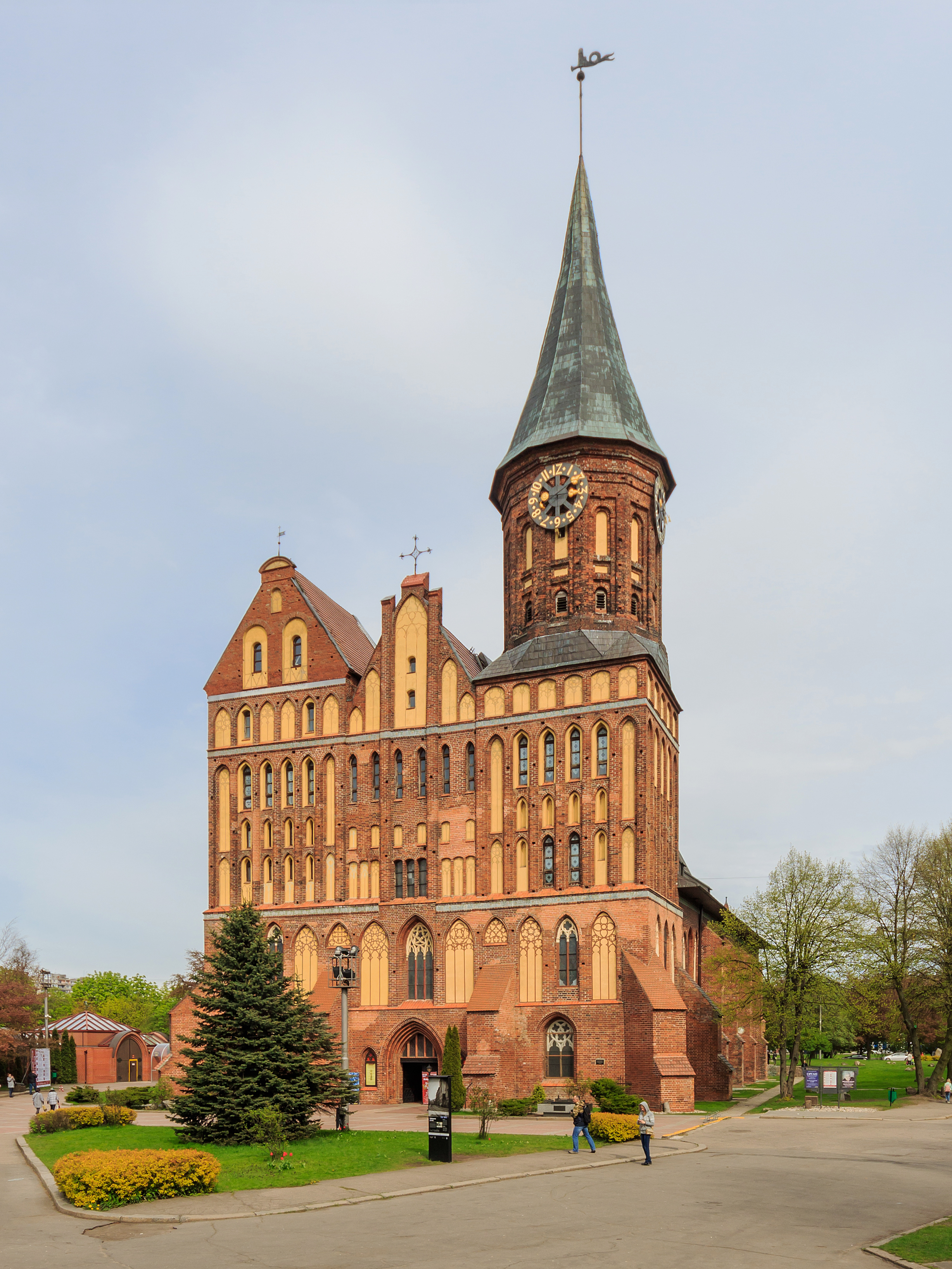
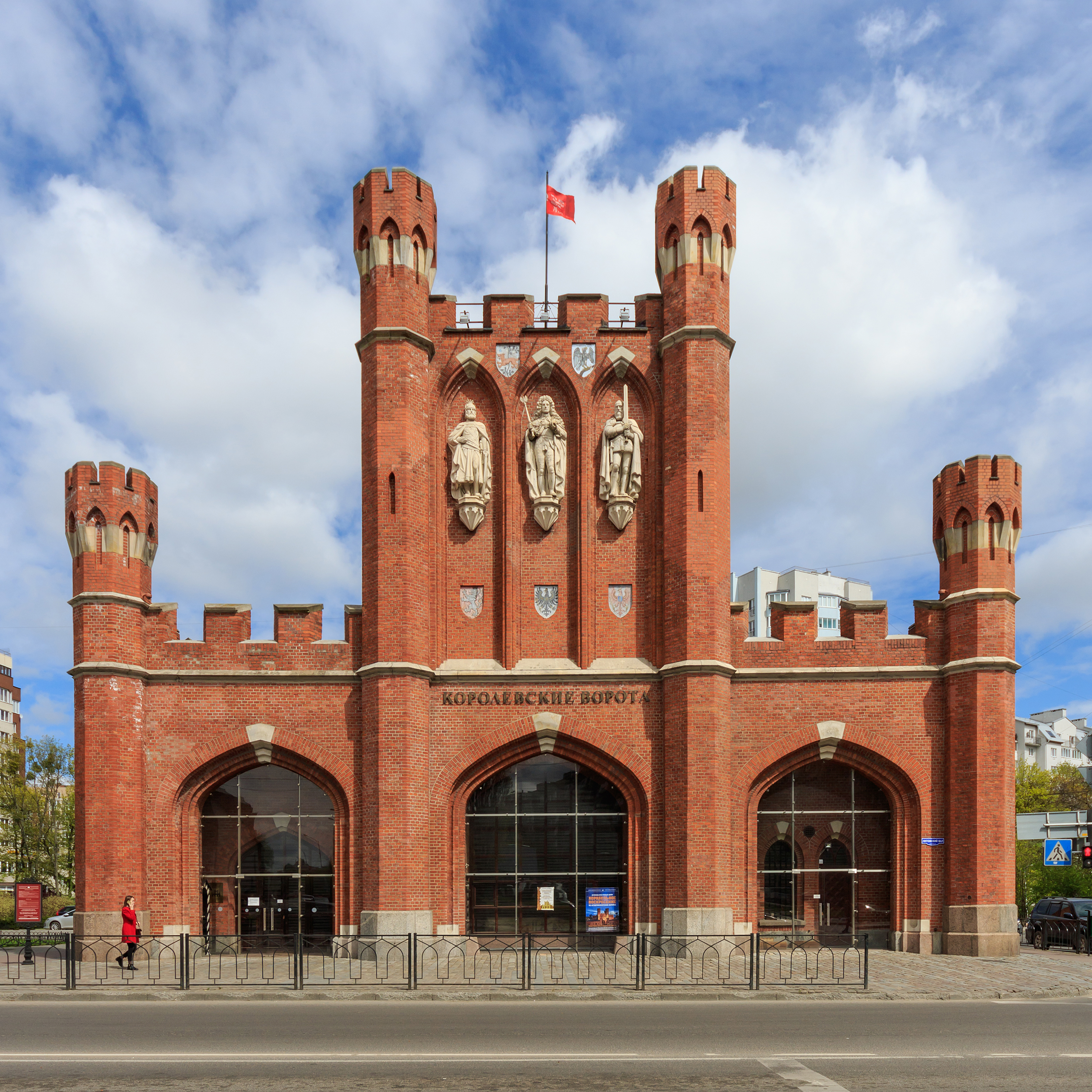
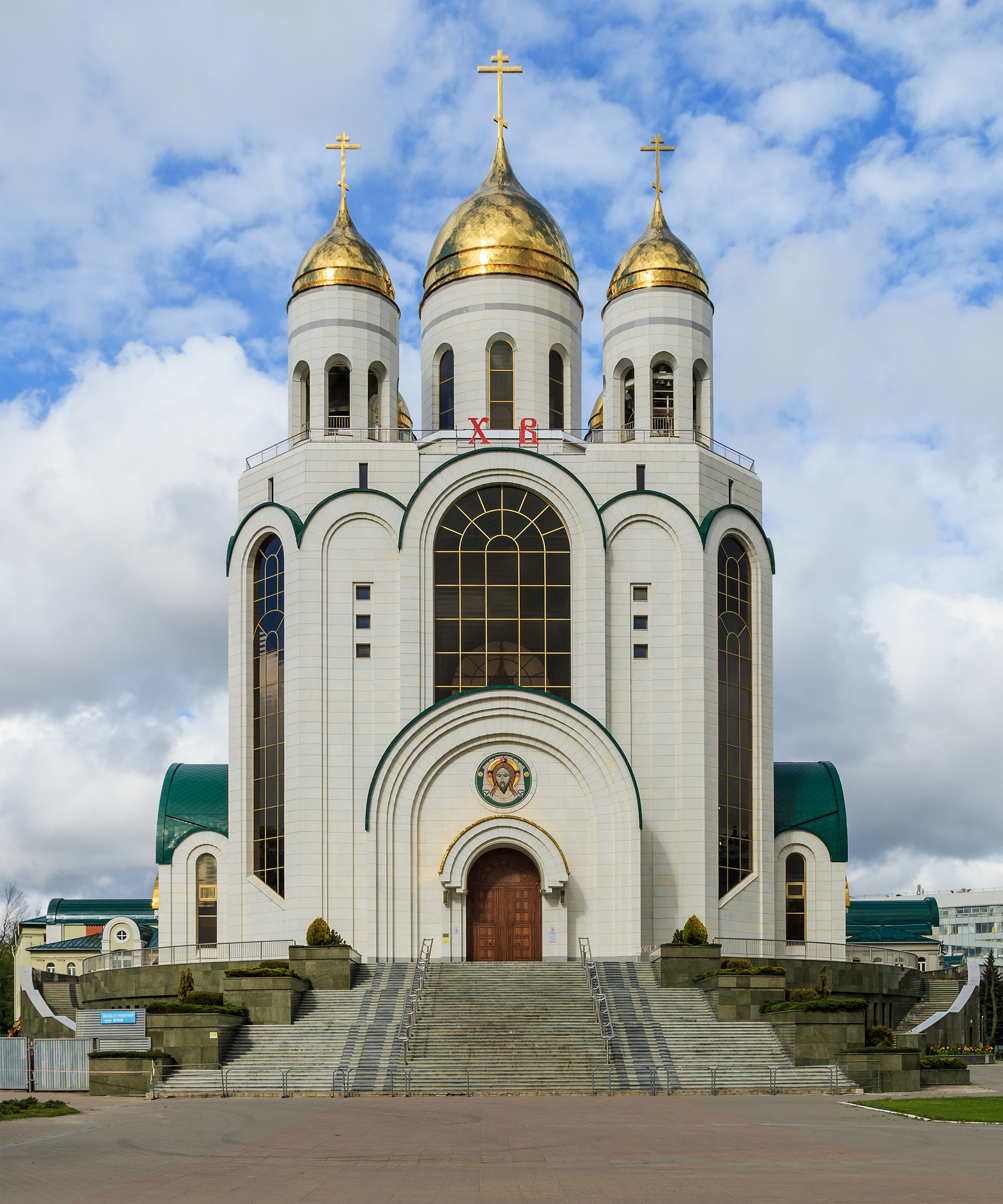
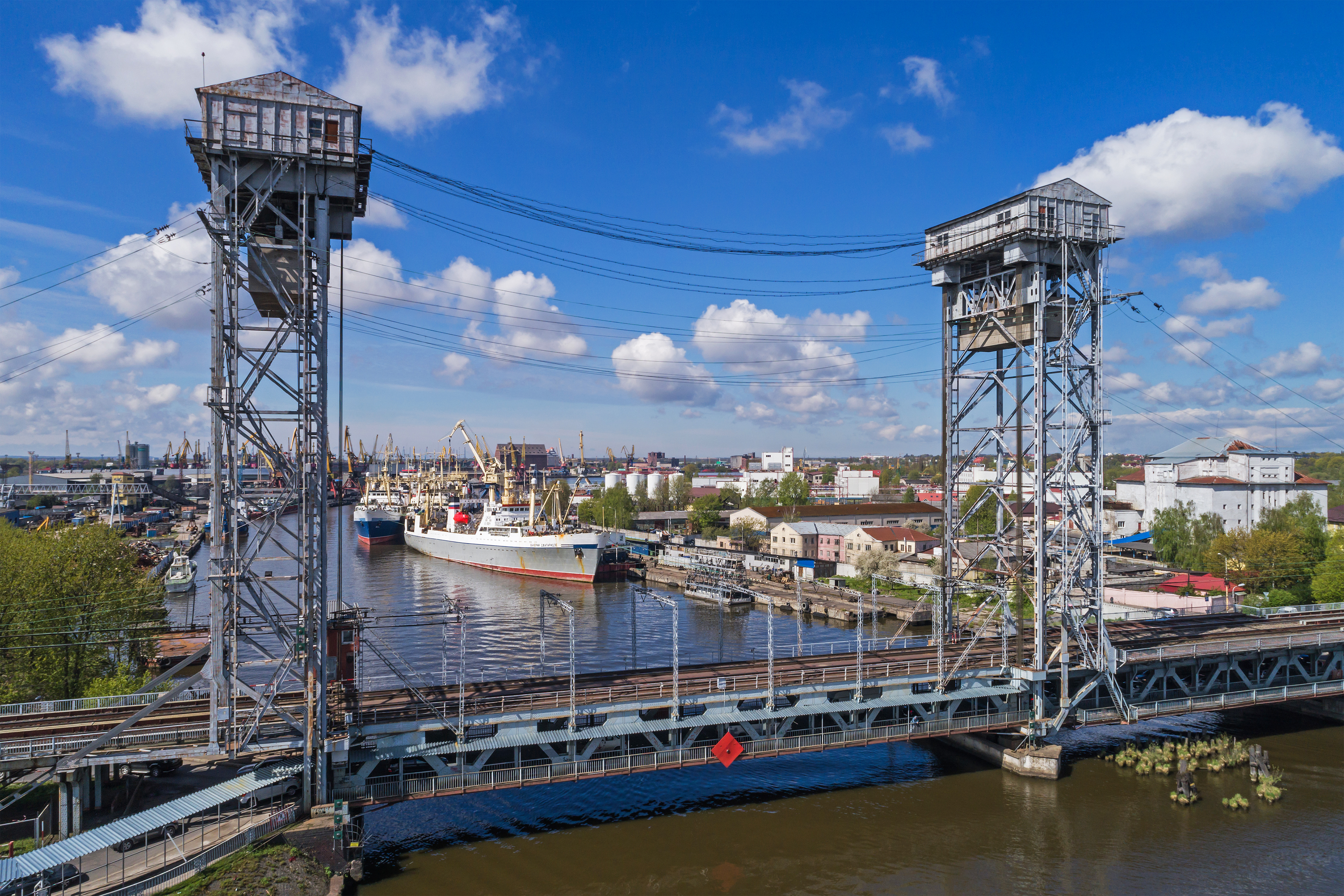
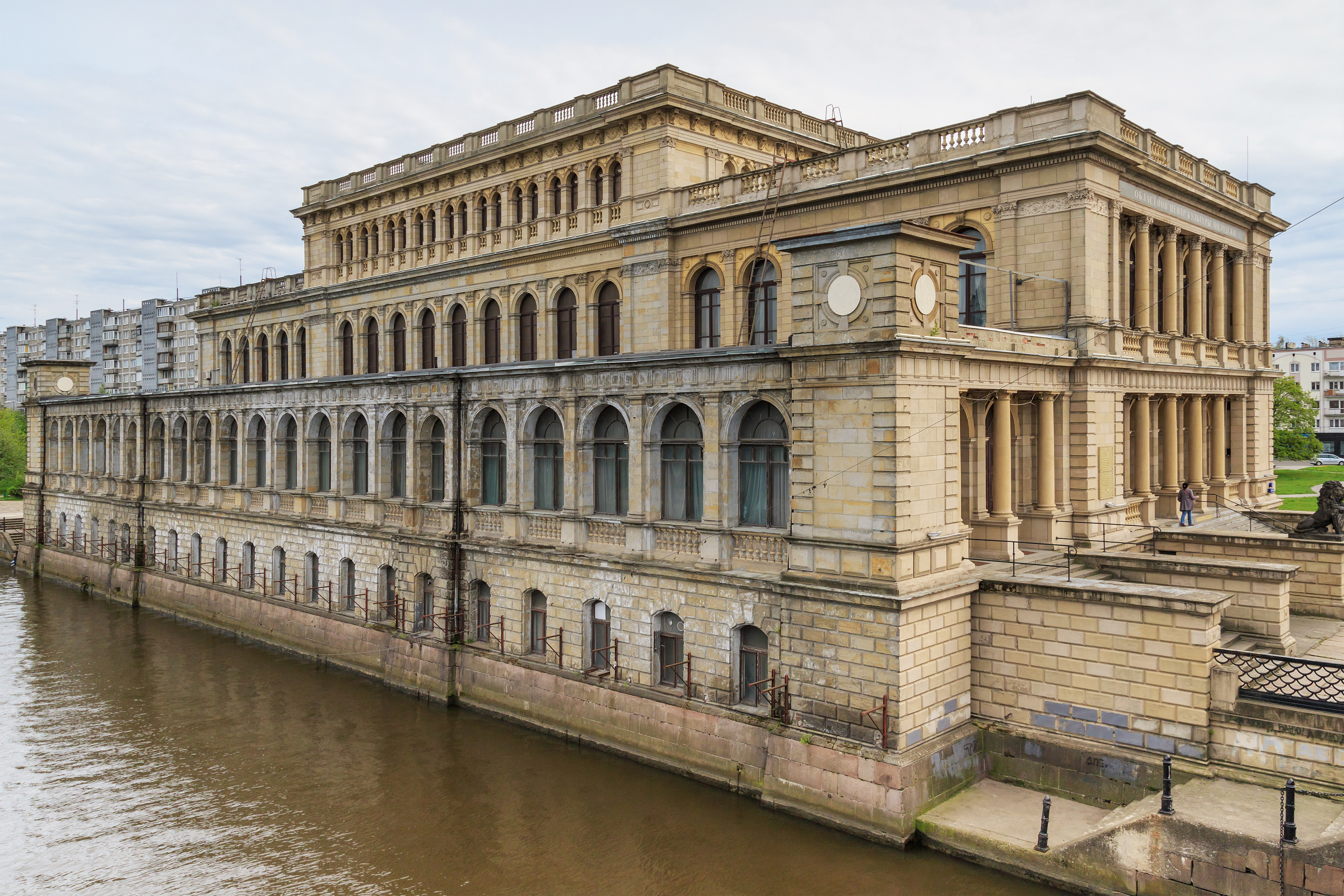
- "Fishermen's village" in pseudo-historic style Königsberg Cathedral King's Gate Christ Saviour Church Railway bridge and port Seamen's Palace of Culture

- Flag Coat of arms
- Interactive map of Kaliningrad
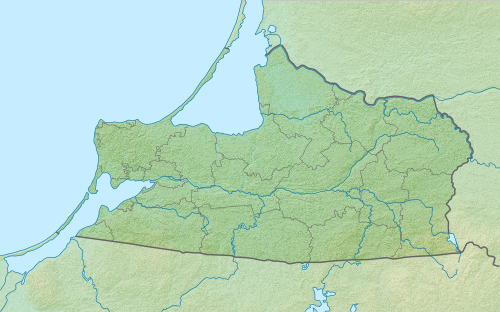
- Location of Kaliningrad in Kaliningrad Oblast Location of Kaliningrad in Russia Location of Kaliningrad in European Russia Location of Kaliningrad in Europe
- Coordinates: 54°42′01″N 20°27′11″E
- Country: Russia
- Federal subject: Kaliningrad Oblast
- Founded: 1 September 1255

Government
  - Body: City Council of Deputies
  - Head: Elena Ivanovna Dyatlova

Area
  - Total: 223.03 km^{2} (86.11 sq mi)
- Elevation: 5 m (16 ft)

Population (2010 Census)
  - Total: 431,402
  - Estimate (2025): 488,843 (+13.3%)
  - Rank: 40th in 2010
  - Density: 1,934.3/km^{2} (5,009.8/sq mi)

Administrative status
  - Subordinated to: city of oblast significance of Kaliningrad
  - Capital of: Kaliningrad Oblast, city of oblast significance of Kaliningrad

Municipal status
  - Urban okrug: Kaliningrad Urban Okrug
  - Capital of: Kaliningrad Urban Okrug
- Time zone: UTC+2 (MSK–1)
- Postal code: 236001 - 236999
- Dialing code: +7 4012
- OKTMO ID: 27701000001
- City Day: 4 July; observed on the first Saturday of July
- Website: klgd.ru

Kaliningrad, (Note: /kəˈlɪnɪŋɡræd/ kə-LIN-in-grad; Russian: Калининград, IPA: [kəlʲɪnʲɪnˈɡrat].) until 1946 known in English as Königsberg, (Note: /ˈkɜːnɪɡzbɜːrɡ/, German: [ˈkøːnɪçsbɛʁk] or [ˈkøːnɪksbɛʁk]; Russian: Кёнигсберг, IPA: [ˈkʲɵnʲɪɡzbʲɪrk], or Короле́вецъ, IPA: [ˈkɐrɐˈlʲɵvʲɪt͡s]; Belarusian: Караляве́ц, romanized: Karaliavets, IPA: [karalʲaˈvʲɛt͡s]; Lithuanian: Karaliaučius Lithuanian pronunciation: [kɐrɐˈlʲæ̂ˑʊ̯t͡ɕʊs]; Polish: Królewiec, Polish pronunciation: [kruˈlɛvjɛt͡s].) is the largest city and administrative centre of Kaliningrad Oblast, an exclave of Russia between Lithuania and Poland (663 kilometres (412 mi) west of the bulk of Russia). Located on the Pregolya River at the head of the Vistula Lagoon, it is the only ice-free Russian port on the Baltic Sea. Its population in 2020 was 489,359. Kaliningrad is the second-largest city in the Northwestern Federal District, after Saint Petersburg, and the eighth-largest city on the Baltic Sea.

Königsberg was founded in 1255 by the Teutonic Knights during the Northern Crusades on the site of the ancient Old Prussian settlement of Twangste, and was named in honor of King Ottokar II of Bohemia, its name meaning 'king's mountain'. A Baltic port city, it successively became the capital of the State of the Teutonic Order, the Duchy of Prussia and the provinces of East Prussia and Prussia. It was the coronation city of the Prussian monarchy, though the capital was moved to Berlin in 1701. Königsberg was the easternmost large city in Germany until World War II.

The city was heavily damaged by Allied bombing in 1944 and during the Battle of Königsberg in 1945; it was then captured by the Soviet Union on 9 April 1945. The Potsdam Agreement of 1945 placed it under Soviet administration. The city was renamed Kaliningrad in 1946 in honour of Russian Bolshevik leader Mikhail Kalinin and repopulated by Russians starting in 1946 in the ruins of Königsberg, in which Lithuanian inhabitants were allowed to remain while the German population was expelled.

Since the dissolution of the Soviet Union, Kaliningrad has been governed as the administrative centre of Russia's Kaliningrad Oblast, the westernmost oblast of Russia. As a major transport hub with sea and river ports, the city is the headquarters of the Baltic Fleet of the Russian Navy and is one of the largest industrial centres in Russia. It was deemed the best city in Russia in 2012, 2013, and 2014 in Kommersant's magazine The Firm's Secret, the best city in Russia for business in 2013 according to Forbes, and was ranked fifth in the Urban Environment Quality Index published by Minstroy in 2019. Kaliningrad has been a major internal migration attraction in Russia over the past two decades and was one of the host cities of the 2018 FIFA World Cup.

== History ==
Historical affiliations

Old Prussians (until 1255)
Teutonic Order (1255–1454)
Kingdom of Poland (1454–1455)
Teutonic Order (1455–1525)
Duchy of Prussia (1525–1656)
(yes) Swedish Empire (1656–1657)
Duchy of Prussia (1657–1701)
Kingdom of Prussia (1701–1758)
Russian Empire (1758–1762)
Kingdom of Prussia (1762–1918)
North German Confederation (1867–1871)
German Empire (1871–1918)
Weimar Republic (1918–1933)
Nazi Germany (1933–1945)
Soviet Union (1945–1991)
Russia (since 1991)

Königsberg was preceded by a Sambian (Old Prussian tribe) fort called Twangste (Prussian word tvinksta means "a pond made by a dam"). The declining Old Prussian culture became extinct around the early 18th century with the Great Northern War plague outbreak, and the surviving Old Prussians were integrated through assimilation.

=== Medieval period ===
During the conquest of the Sambians by the Teutonic Knights in 1255, Twangste was destroyed and replaced by a fortress named Königsberg in honour of Bohemian King Ottokar II. It was initially divided into three towns, the Old Town (German: Altstadt), Löbenicht and Kneiphof, which were granted town rights in 1286, 1300 and 1327, respectively. It was inhabited by German colonists and indigenous Old Prussians from the 13th century, then also by Poles from the 14th century with the 1327 charter of Kneiphof permitting the settlement of Poles (up to 30% in the 17th century), Lithuanians from the 15th century, and French from the 17th century (Huguenot community founded in 1686).

In 1454, Königsberg integrated within borders of Poland for a year as the capital of the Królewiec Voivodeship. As a result of the Second Peace of Thorn (1466), Königsberg and the surrounding region became a vassal state of the Crown of the Kingdom of Poland. During this period, trade relations developed with Poland, Lithuania, England, the Netherlands, Lübeck, Sweden and western France.

=== Early modern period ===
After the secularisation of the Teutonic Order in 1525, Königsberg became the capital of the Duchy of Prussia, remaining under Polish suzerainty. The city became an early and influential centre of the Reformation. Although predominantly inhabited by Germans, it was also an important centre of Polish and Lithuanian culture, especially as one of the pioneering centres of Polish and Lithuanian printing, and also thanks to the University of Königsberg, the second-oldest university of the Polish–Lithuanian Commonwealth. The city was the second largest centre of Polish printing after Kraków. The population became predominantly Lutheran, although in the 17th century Roman Catholic and Calvinist churches were erected with German and Polish services in both rites, Lithuanian in the Catholic and French and English in the Calvinist.

In 1618, the Duchy of Prussia fell under the control of the Electors of Brandenburg, a branch of the Hohenzollern dynasty, and in 1657 it became controlled in personal union with Brandenburg (sometimes referred to as Brandenburg–Prussia). Poland functioned as the guarantor of Königsberg's political freedoms within the duchy. While opposing incorporation into Poland, the city maintained close ties with the Polish crown. Polish authorities several times confirmed and extended its rights in support against absolutist ambitions of the Prussian dukes, and after 1657 the city actively opposed secession from Poland. The city acted as an intermediary in maritime trade between the Polish–Lithuanian Commonwealth and the Netherlands, England and France, with the 17th century stock exchange including a painting depicting a townswoman buying goods from a Pole and a Dutchman, embracing the notion that the city's prosperity was based on trade with the East and West, particularly Poland and the Netherlands. It was the preferred export port, although not the only one, for parts of Warmia, Masuria, Mazovia and Podlachia in Poland, and several important trade routes from other places in Poland also led to the city, and one of the main ports (alongside Riga and Klaipėda) for Lithuania.

=== Late modern period ===
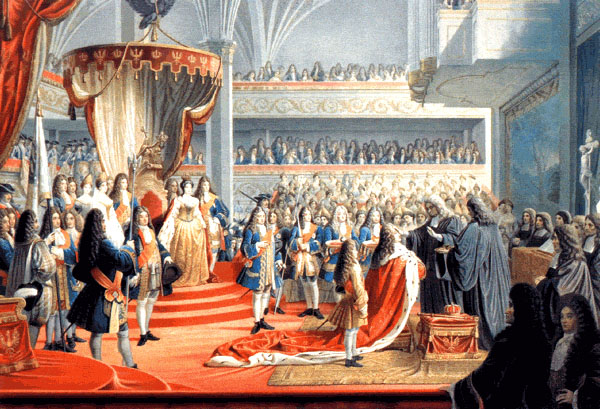
Anointment of Frederick I after his coronation as King in Prussia in Königsberg, 1701

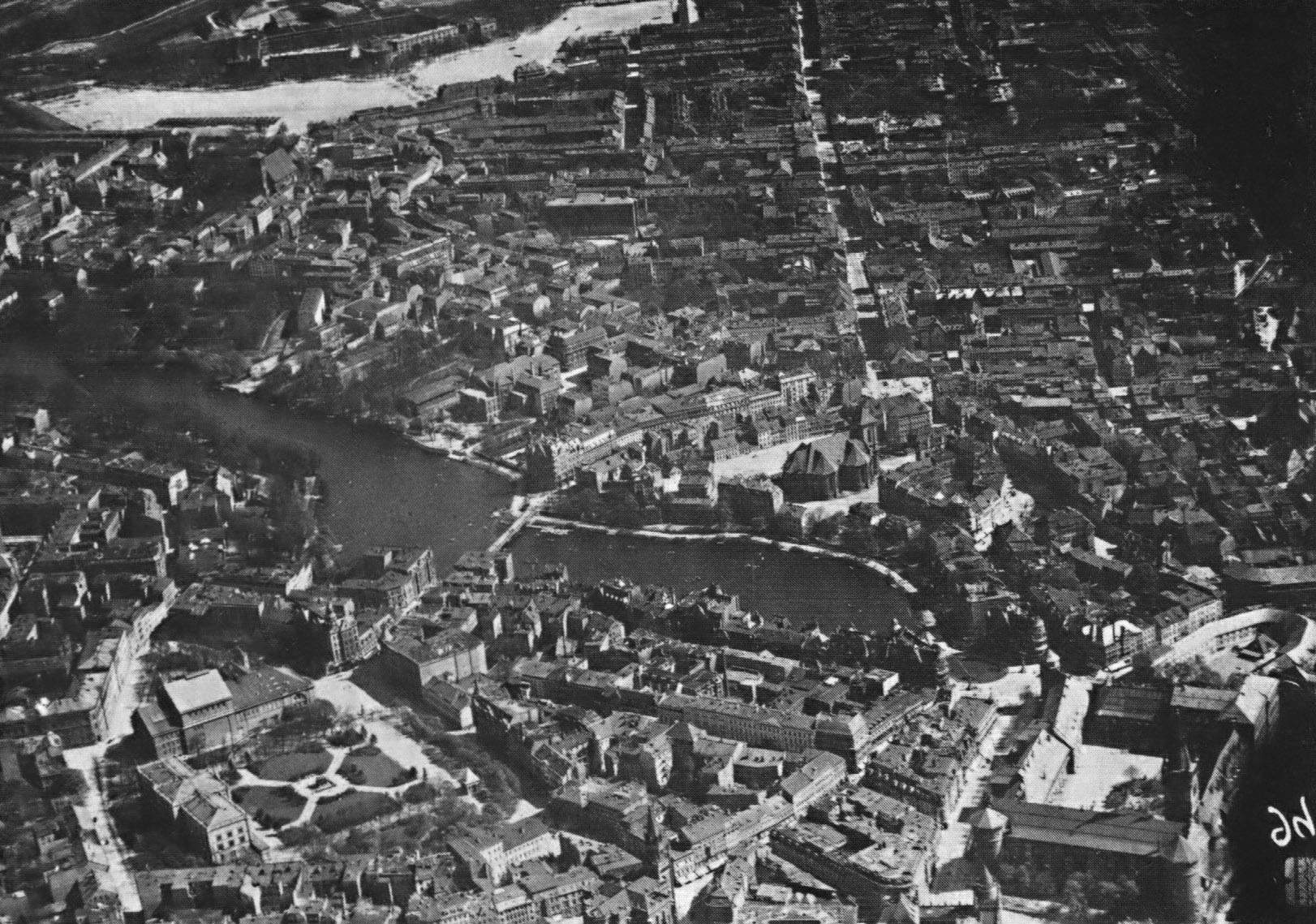
Aerial view before 1944

From 1701, Brandenburg–Prussia became a kingdom, and the entire area was referred to as the Kingdom of Prussia. While the Brandenburg portion was a part of the Holy Roman Empire and later the German Confederation, Prussia (later called East Prussia) was not included within those territorial boundaries. In 1734–1736, during the War of the Polish Succession, it was the place of stay of Polish King Stanisław Leszczyński and many of his prominent supporters. Church services in Polish, Lithuanian and French were held until the 19th century.

In the context of the Seven Years' War, the city was conquered and occupied by the Russian Empire from 1758 to 1762, whose initial plan was to offer the city and region to Poland as part of a territorial exchange desired by Russia. From 1786 to 1791, it was the main port for grain exports from Lithuania.

In the ensuing two centuries, the city, first as part of the Kingdom of Prussia, then from 1866 as part of the North German Confederation, and then from 1871 as part of the German Empire, continued to flourish and many iconic landmarks were built. The city had around 370,000 inhabitants and was a cultural and administrative centre of Prussia and the German Empire. One of the first civil airports in Germany (Devau near Königsberg) was established in 1920 with its first scheduled service in 1922. In that time, a new central railway station and modern buildings for the harbour and trade fair were built.

=== World War II ===
During World War II, the Polish resistance movement was active, which served as one of the region's main transfer points for smuggled Polish underground press. In 1944, the city was heavily damaged by a British bombing attack, as well as a massive Soviet siege in the spring of 1945. At the end of World War II, the city became part of the Russian SFSR (as part of the Soviet Union).

=== Soviet Union ===
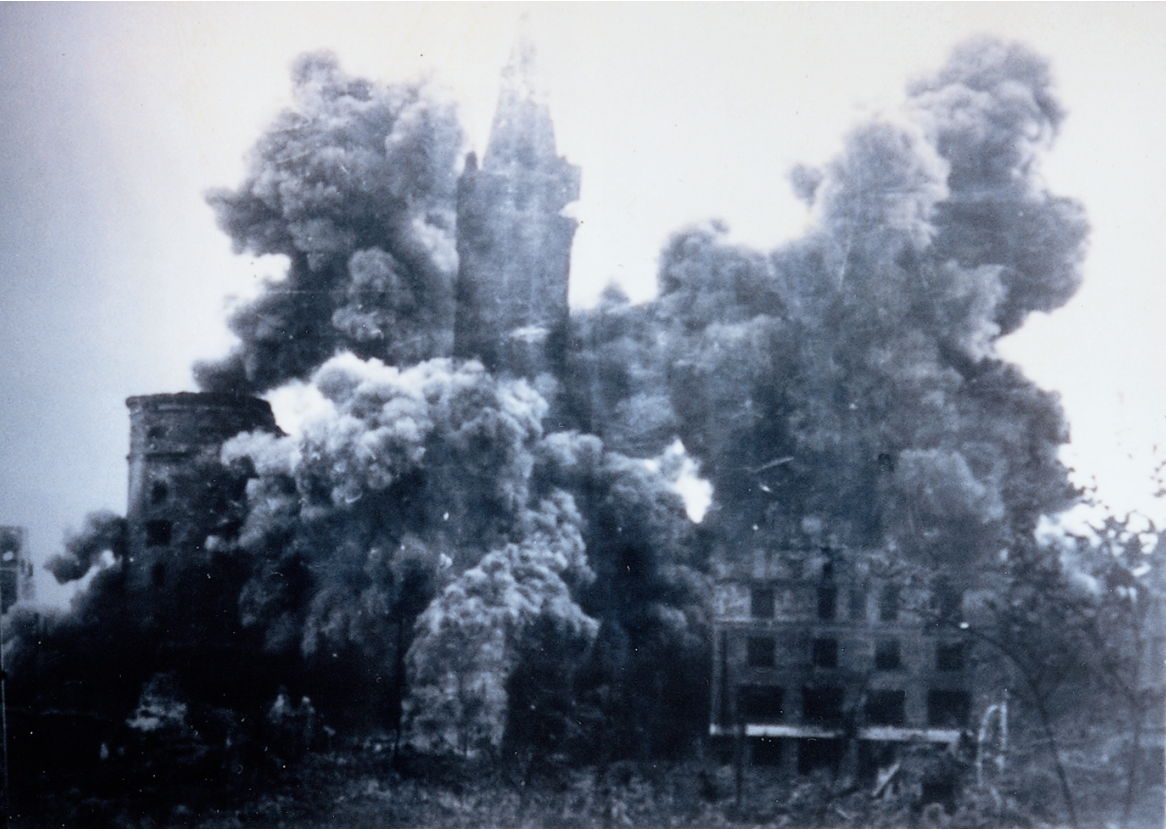
Demolition of Königsberg Castle with explosives, 1959. The last remnants were destroyed by 1968.

Under the Potsdam Agreement of 1 August 1945, Königsberg became part of the Soviet Union pending the final determination of territorial borders. This final determination eventually took place on 12 September 1990 when the Treaty on the Final Settlement with Respect to Germany was signed. The excerpt from the initial agreement pertaining to the partition of East Prussia, including the area surrounding Königsberg, is as follows (note that Königsberg uses the transcription "Koenigsberg" in the original document, as "ö" is not part of the English alphabet ):

VI. CITY OF KOENIGSBERG AND THE ADJACENT AREA
The Conference examined a proposal by the Soviet Government that pending the final determination of territorial questions at the peace settlement, the section of the western frontier of the Union of Soviet Socialist Republics which is adjacent to the Baltic Sea should pass from a point on the eastern shore of the Bay of Danzig to the east, north of Braunsberg – Goldep, to the meeting point of the frontiers of Lithuania, the Polish Republic and East Prussia. The Conference has agreed in principle to the proposal of the Soviet Government concerning the ultimate transfer to the Soviet Union of the city of Koenigsberg and the area adjacent to it as described above, subject to expert examination of the actual frontier.

United States President Harry S. Truman and British Prime Minister Clement Attlee supported the proposal of the Conference at the forthcoming peace settlement.

Königsberg was renamed Kaliningrad in July 1946 in honour of Mikhail Kalinin, the Chairman of the Presidium of the Supreme Soviet, who had recently died. Kalinin was unrelated to the city, and there were already cities named in honour of Kalinin in the Soviet Union, namely Kalinin (now Tver) and Kaliningrad (now Korolev, Moscow Oblast). Some historians speculate that the city may have originally been offered to the Lithuanian SSR because the resolution from the conference specifies that Kaliningrad's border would be at the (pre-war) Lithuanian frontier. The remaining German population was forcibly expelled between 1947 and 1948. The annexed territory was populated with Soviet citizens, mostly ethnic Russians but to a lesser extent also Ukrainians and Belarusians. The German language was replaced with the Russian language. In 1956, there were 188,000 inhabitants, which was only half the number of the pre-war population.

From 1953 to 1962, a monument to Joseph Stalin stood on Victory Square. In 1973, the town hall was turned into the House of Soviets. In 1975, the trolleybus was launched again. In 1980, a concert hall was opened in the building of the former Lutheran Church of the Holy Family. In 1986, the Kreuzkirche building was transferred to the Russian Orthodox Church. For foreigners, the city was completely closed and, with the exception of rare visits of friendship from neighbouring Poland, it was practically not visited by foreigners.

The old city was not restored, and the ruins of the Königsberg Castle were demolished in the late 1960s, on Leonid Brezhnev's personal orders, despite the protests of architects, historians and residents of the city. The reconstruction of the oblast, threatened by hunger in the immediate post-war years, was carried out through an ambitious policy of oceanic fishing with the creation of one of the main fishing harbours of the USSR in Kaliningrad. Fishing not only fed the regional economy but also provided a basis for social and scientific development, particularly in oceanography.

In 1957, an agreement was signed and later came into force, which delimited the border between the Polish People's Republic (a Soviet satellite state at the time) and the Soviet Union. The region was added as a semi-exclave to the Russian SFSR; since 1946 it has been known as the Kaliningrad Oblast. According to some historians, Stalin created it as an oblast separate from the Lithuanian SSR because it further separated the Baltic states from the West. Others think that the reason was that the region was far too strategic for the USSR to leave it in the hands of another SSR other than the Russian one. In the 1950s, Nikita Khrushchev offered the entire Kaliningrad Oblast to the Lithuanian SSR, but Antanas Sniečkus refused to accept the territory because it would add at least a million ethnic Russians to Lithuania proper.

The Treaty of Moscow was signed on 12 August 1970 between the Soviet Union and West Germany. The signatories renounced the use of force and recognised the postwar borders.

In 2010, the German magazine Der Spiegel published a report claiming that Kaliningrad had been offered to Germany in 1990 (against payment). The offer was not seriously considered by the West German government, which at the time saw reunification with East Germany as a higher priority. However, this story was later denied by Mikhail Gorbachev.

=== Russian Federation ===
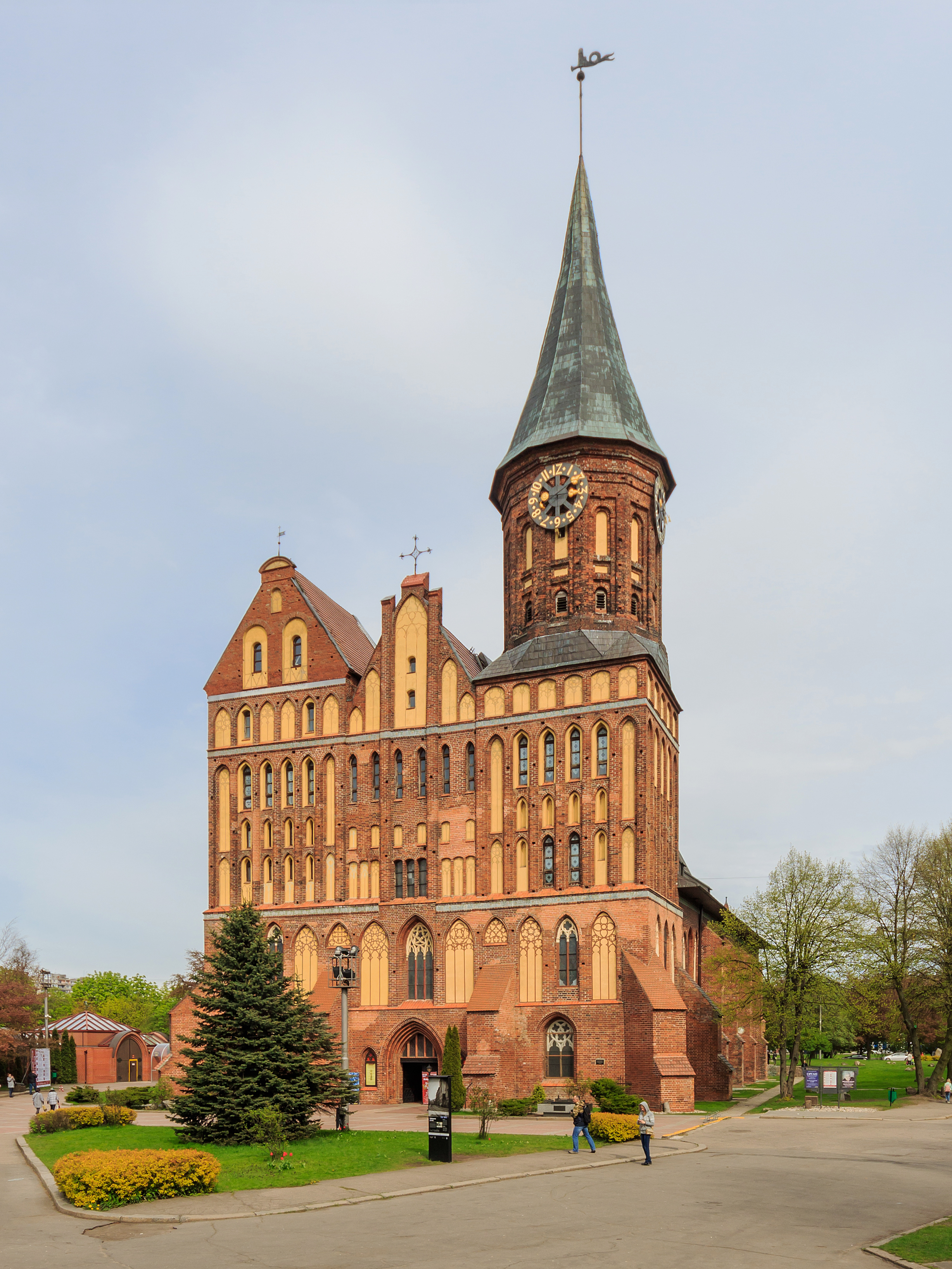
The Königsberg Cathedral, restored in the 1990s

The town of Baltiysk, just outside Kaliningrad, is the only Russian Baltic Sea port said to be "ice-free" all year round, and the region hence plays an important role in maintenance of the Baltic Fleet.

With the collapse of the Soviet Union in 1991, Kaliningrad became separated from the rest of Russia by independent countries. This isolation became even more pronounced politically when Poland and Lithuania became members of NATO and subsequently the European Union in 2004. All military and civilian land links between the region and the rest of Russia have to pass through members of NATO and the EU. Special travel arrangements for the territory's inhabitants have been made through the Facilitated Transit Document and Facilitated Rail Transit Document.

While in the 1990s some Soviet-era city names commemorating communist leaders were changed (e.g., Leningrad reverting to Saint Petersburg and Kalinin, also named after Mikhail Kalinin, reverting to Tver), Kaliningrad remains named as it was, though the city is sometimes colloquially referred to as König or Kyonig (Russian: Кёниг). The question of the name of the city has been raised multiple times; in 2009, the head of the city administration, Felix Lapin, said he personally supported the return of the historical name of the city, and in 2011, the governor of Kaliningrad Oblast, Nikolay Tsukanov, suggested a referendum could be held to resolve the issue but stated that he was against renaming. No further plans have been announced since, and in 2022 the government officially confirmed that renaming the city would be "inappropriate". The name also raises objections in neighbouring Poland, as it commemorates a man co-responsible for the decision to carry out the mass murder of nearly 22,000 Poles during World War II (Katyn massacre), and the Polish authorities recommend using the historical Polish name Królewiec in the Polish language.

Some of the cultural heritage, most notably the Königsberg Cathedral, was restored in the 1990s, as citizens started to examine the previously ignored German past. Since the early 1990s, the Kaliningrad oblast has been a Free Economic Zone (FEZ Yantar). In 2005, the city celebrated its 750th anniversary. In July 2007 Russian First Deputy Prime Minister Sergei Ivanov declared that if US-controlled missile defence systems were deployed in Poland, then nuclear weapons might be deployed in Kaliningrad. On 5 November 2008, Russian President Dmitry Medvedev said that installing missiles in Kaliningrad was almost a certainty. These plans were suspended, however, in January 2009.

During late 2011, a long-range Voronezh radar was commissioned to monitor missile launches within about 6,000 kilometres (3,728 miles). It is situated in the settlement of Pionersky (formerly German Neukuhren) in Kaliningrad Oblast.

Kaliningrad was one of the host cities for the 2018 FIFA World Cup held in Russia.

In February 2025, Kaliningrad's power grid became disconnected from Russia's power grid as the Baltic states interrupted the interconnector at Viļaka. An estimated 1 billion dollars had to be spent (partially on additional gas-powered plants) to balance the grid internally.

== Geography ==
Kaliningrad is at the mouth of the navigable Pregolya River, which empties into the Vistula Lagoon, an inlet of the Baltic Sea. Sea vessels can access Gdańsk Bay and the Baltic Sea by way of the Vistula Lagoon and the Strait of Baltiysk.

Until around 1900, ships drawing more than 2 meters (6 ft 7 in) of water could not pass the bar and use the city's docks; larger vessels had to anchor at Pillau (now Baltiysk), where cargo was transferred to smaller vessels. In 1901, a ship canal between Königsberg and Pillau, completed at a cost of 13 million German marks, enabled vessels of a 6.5 m (21 ft 4 in) draught to moor alongside the town (see also Ports of the Baltic Sea).

=== Climate ===
Kaliningrad has an oceanic climate (Cfb, depending on the isotherm chosen for class C climates) or a humid continental climate (Dfb, depending on the isotherm chosen for class D climates), with cold and cloudy (though moderate compared to most of Russia) winters and mild summers with frequent showers and thunderstorms. Average temperatures range from −1.5 to +18.1 °C (29.3 to 64.6 °F) and rainfall varies from 36.0 millimeters (1.42 in)/month to 97.0 millimeters (3.82 in)/month. In general, it has maritime influences and therefore damp, variable and mild, with vast temperature differences between July and January.

The seasons are clearly differentiated. Spring starts in March and is initially cold and windy, later becoming pleasantly warm and often very sunny. Summer, which begins in June, is predominantly warm but hot at times (with temperatures reaching as high as +30–+35 °C (86–95 °F) at least once per year) with plenty of sunshine interspersed with heavy showers. The average annual hours of sunshine for Kaliningrad is 1700, similar to other northern cities. Autumn comes in September and is at first warm and usually sunny, turning cold, damp and foggy in November. Winter includes periods of snow. January and February are the coldest months with the temperature sometimes dropping as low as −15 °C (5 °F).

Climate data for Kaliningrad (1991–2020, extremes 1848–present)
Month	Jan	Feb	Mar	Apr	May	Jun	Jul	Aug	Sep	Oct	Nov	Dec	Year
Record high °C (°F)	12.7 (54.9)	16.9 (62.4)	23.3 (73.9)	28.8 (83.8)	30.6 (87.1)	34.0 (93.2)	36.3 (97.3)	36.5 (97.7)	33.8 (92.8)	26.4 (79.5)	19.4 (66.9)	13.3 (55.9)	36.5 (97.7)
Mean daily maximum °C (°F)	1.1 (34.0)	2.1 (35.8)	6.1 (43.0)	13.1 (55.6)	18.2 (64.8)	21.3 (70.3)	23.5 (74.3)	23.3 (73.9)	18.4 (65.1)	12.2 (54.0)	6.2 (43.2)	2.6 (36.7)	12.3 (54.1)
Daily mean °C (°F)	−1.2 (29.8)	−0.6 (30.9)	2.4 (36.3)	7.9 (46.2)	12.7 (54.9)	16.1 (61.0)	18.5 (65.3)	18.1 (64.6)	13.5 (56.3)	8.4 (47.1)	3.9 (39.0)	0.4 (32.7)	8.3 (46.9)
Mean daily minimum °C (°F)	−3.5 (25.7)	−3.0 (26.6)	−0.8 (30.6)	3.4 (38.1)	7.5 (45.5)	11.3 (52.3)	13.9 (57.0)	13.3 (55.9)	9.4 (48.9)	5.2 (41.4)	1.7 (35.1)	−1.8 (28.8)	4.7 (40.5)
Record low °C (°F)	−32.5 (−26.5)	−33.3 (−27.9)	−21.7 (−7.1)	−5.8 (21.6)	−3.1 (26.4)	0.7 (33.3)	4.5 (40.1)	1.6 (34.9)	−2.0 (28.4)	−11.1 (12.0)	−18.7 (−1.7)	−25.6 (−14.1)	−33.3 (−27.9)
Average precipitation mm (inches)	68 (2.7)	54 (2.1)	49 (1.9)	38 (1.5)	52 (2.0)	69 (2.7)	91 (3.6)	91 (3.6)	73 (2.9)	86 (3.4)	76 (3.0)	69 (2.7)	816 (32.1)
Average extreme snow depth cm (inches)	7 (2.8)	7 (2.8)	3 (1.2)	0 (0)	0 (0)	0 (0)	0 (0)	0 (0)	0 (0)	0 (0)	2 (0.8)	5 (2.0)	7 (2.8)
Average rainy days	14	13	14	14	14	16	15	16	17	18	18	16	185
Average snowy days	15	15	10	3	0	0	0	0	0	1	7	13	64
Average relative humidity (%)	85	83	78	72	71	74	75	77	81	83	86	87	79
Mean monthly sunshine hours	35	61	120	171	253	264	257	228	158	96	38	26	1,707
Source 1: Pogoda.ru.net
Source 2: NOAA (sun 1961–1990)

== Demographics ==
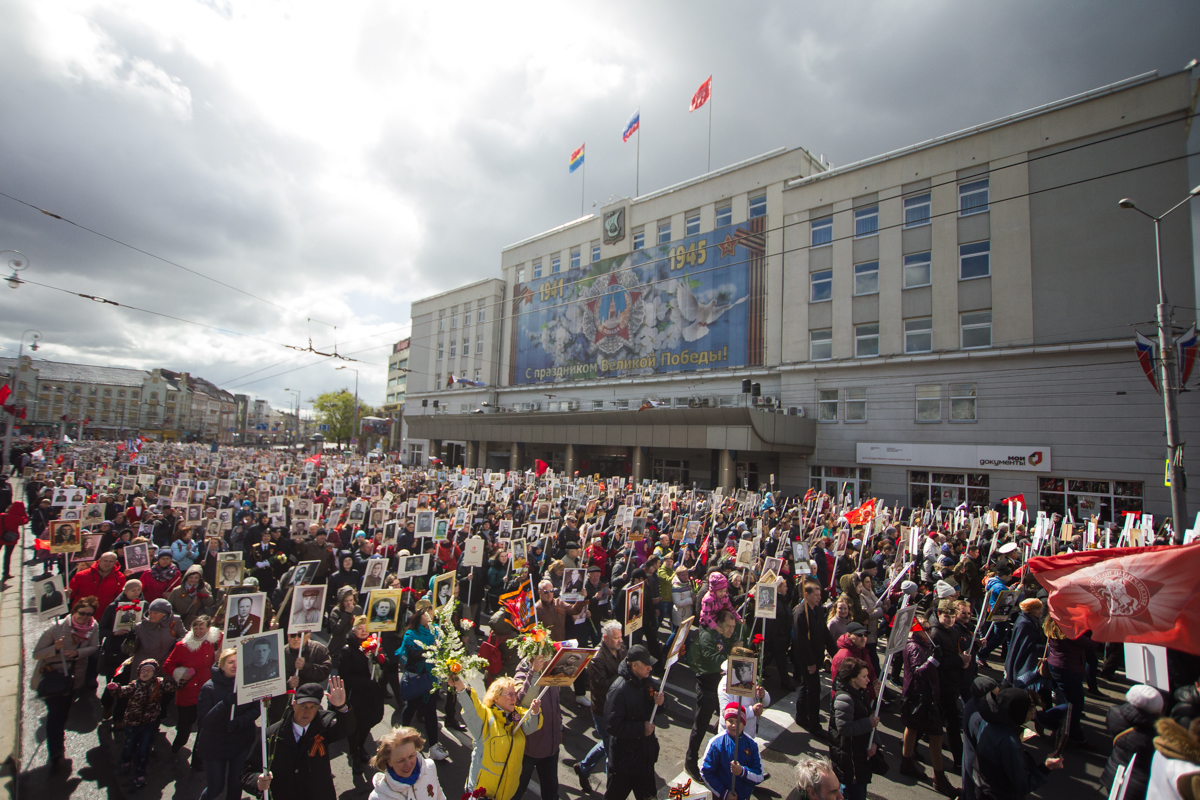
Local residents in Kaliningrad at "Immortal regiment", carrying portraits of their ancestors who fought in World War II.

Historical population
Year	Pop.	±%
1897	162,000	—
1959	203,570	+25.7%
1970	296,962	+45.9%
1979	354,788	+19.5%
1989	401,280	+13.1%
2002	430,003	+7.2%
2010	431,902	+0.4%
2021	490,449	+13.6%
Source: Census data

The original German population fled or was expelled after the end of World War II, when the territory was annexed by the Soviet Union, and in the following few years. In October 1945, only about 5,000 Soviet civilians lived in the territory. Between October 1947 and October 1948 approximately 100,000 Germans were forcibly moved to Germany, and by 1948 about 400,000 Soviet civilians had arrived in the Oblast.

Today, the overwhelming majority of Kaliningrad's residents are Russians settled after 1945, and their descendants. A minority of the population is from other Slavic ethnic groups, including Belarusians and Ukrainians. Kaliningrad today is also home to small communities of Tatars, Germans, Armenians, Poles, and Lithuanians.

Ethnic composition, 2010 Russian census:

Ethnicity	total population	% of the population
Russians	351,186	87.4%
Ukrainians	16,053	4.0%
Belarusians	15,077	3.7%
Armenians	3,062	0.8%
Tatars	2,075	0.5%
Lithuanians	1,789	0.4%
Germans	1,676	0.4%
Poles	1,114	0.3%
Other ethnicities	10,041	2.5%
All	401,649	100.0%

Provisional results, 2021 Russian census:

Provisional population results on 1 October 2021 (thousands)			2021 compared to 2010** (total population % change)	In the total number of population, %			
total population	including		2021 compared to 2010** (total population % change)	2021		2010**	
total population	urban	rural	2021 compared to 2010** (total population % change)	urban	rural	urban	rural
1,030	791	239	109.3	76.8	23.2	77.6	22.4

== Cityscape ==
=== Architecture ===
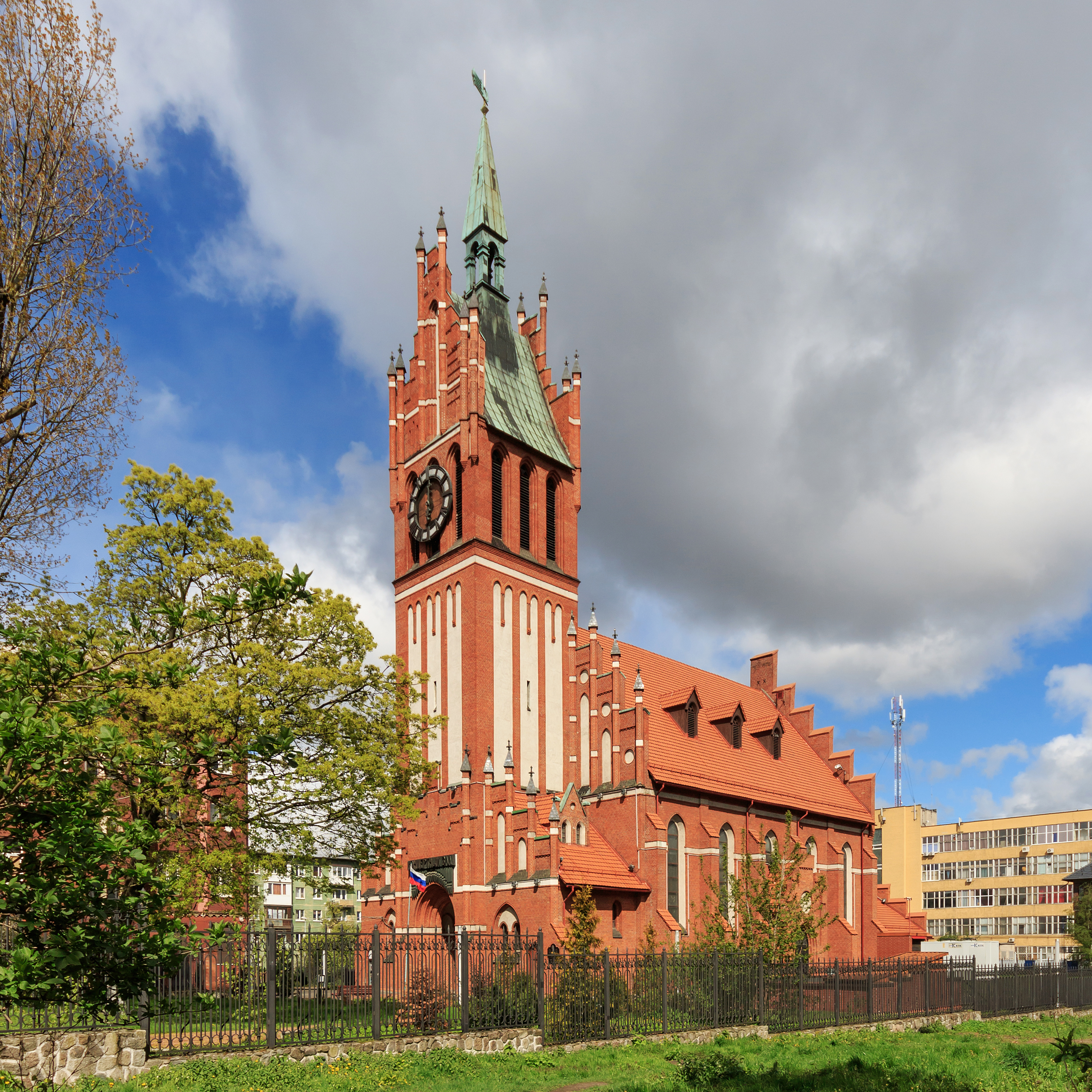
Church of the Holy Family

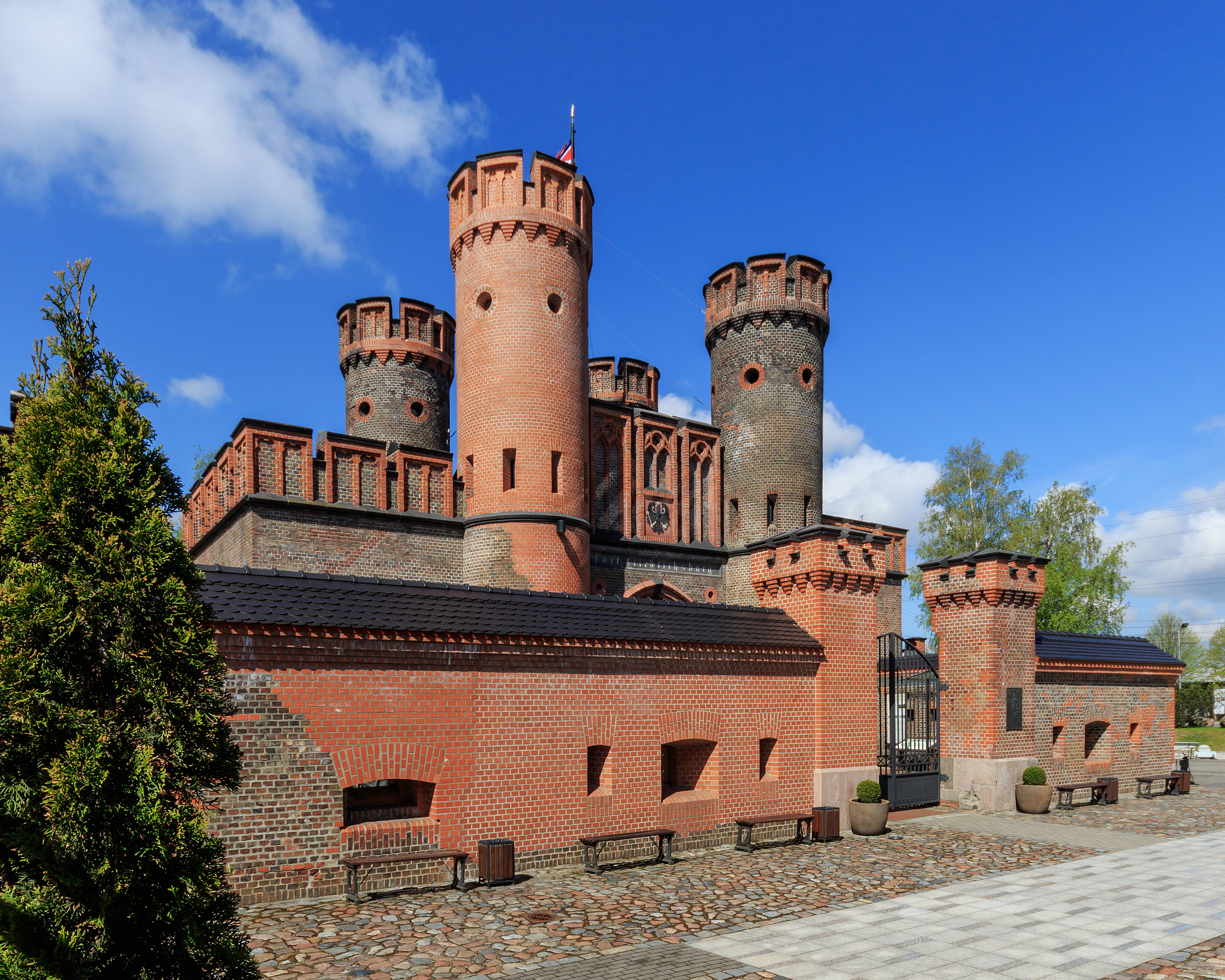
Friedrichsburg Gate

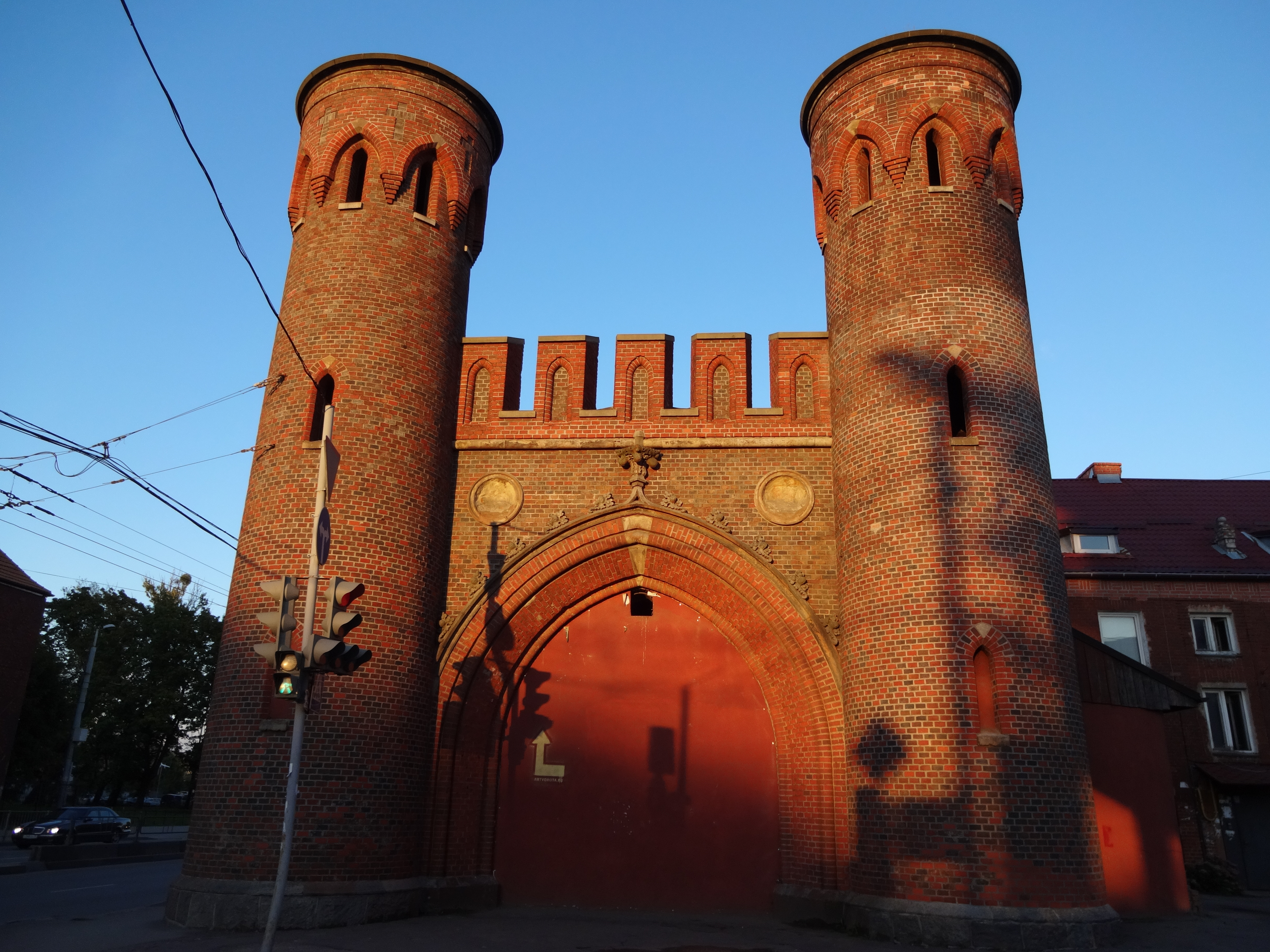
Sackheim Gate

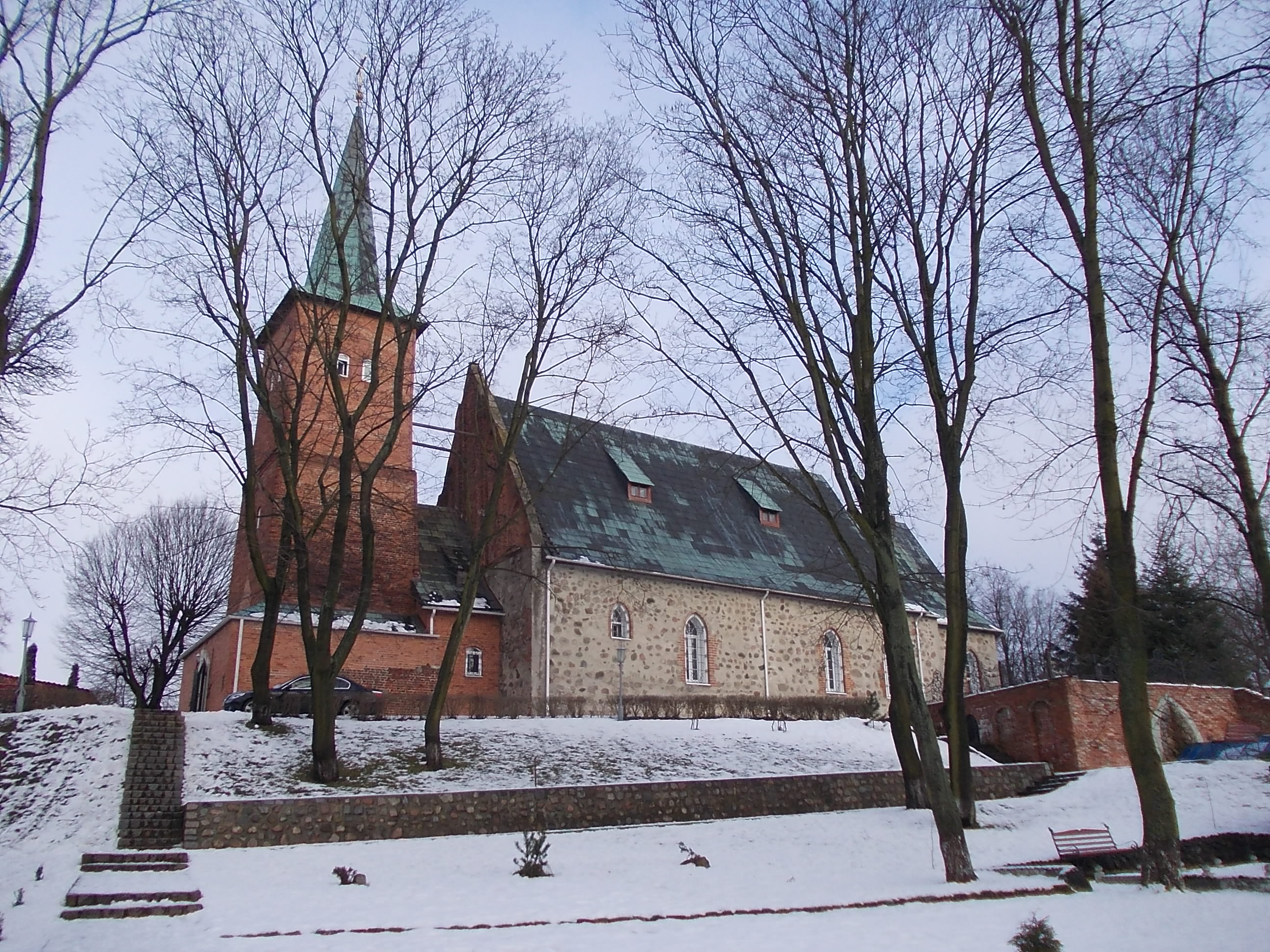
Juditten Church

The pre-war city centre (Altstadt and Kneiphof) consists of parks, broad avenues, a square on the site of the former Königsberg Castle, and the restored Königsberg Cathedral on the Kneiphof island (now "Kant island"). Immanuel Kant's grave is situated next to the cathedral. The never-finished House of Soviets ("Dom Sovyetov") sat roughly on the site of the former castle before its demolition in 2023-2024. A number of German-era buildings in the historic city centre have been preserved and even rebuilt, including the reconstruction of the Königsberg Synagogue. The new city centre is concentrated around Victory Square. The Cathedral of Christ the Saviour, consecrated in 2005, is located on that square.

The oldest building is the Juditten Church (built before 1288). Also worth seeing are the former Stock Exchange, the surviving churches, and the remaining city gates. In counter-clockwise order these gates are: the Sackheim Gate, King's Gate, Rossgarten Gate, Attack Gate (German: Ausfallstor, or Sally Port), Railway Gate (Eisenbahntor), Brandenburg Gate, and Friedland Gate (Friedländer Tor (Kaliningrad)). Apart from the Dohna Tower, which houses the Amber Museum, the Wrangel Tower also remains as a reminder of the former Königsberg city walls. Only the gate of the former Fort Friedrichsburg remains.

Leonhard Euler's 1736 paper on the puzzle of the Seven Bridges of Königsberg was a seminal work in the fields of graph theory and topology. Only two of the structures from his era survive. In 2018, the Kaliningrad Stadium, located on Oktyabrsky Island, near the embankment of the Staraya Pregolya River, was opened. The stadium has a seating capacity of 35,000.

=== Monuments ===
Notable monuments include the statue of Immanuel Kant in front of the Immanuel Kant State University of Russia. The statue was made by the notable sculptor Christian Daniel Rauch and unveiled in 1864. The statue was destroyed in 1945, but was remoulded in 1992 on the initiative of Marion Dönhoff, a native East Prussian who became prominent in the West. Also worth seeing is the Cosmonaut monument, which honours the Kaliningrad cosmonauts Alexey Leonov, Yuri Romanenko and Aleksandr Viktorenko. Other statues and monuments include the statue for Duke Albert, the statue for Friedrich Schiller, the statue for communist functionary Mikhail Kalinin for whom the city is named, the statue for Tsar Peter the Great, Vladimir Vysotsky, the "Mother Russia" monument, and the Monument for the 1200 Guardsmen, remembering the Battle of Königsberg.

=== Parks ===
Kaliningrad is a "green" city with many parks and areas with many trees and lawns. Parks range from tiny city squares to massive parks.

The Youth Recreation Park is one of the most popular parks in the city. The park was established in the 1920s–1930s in the English style. It reopened its doors post-war and was popular among citizens in the 1980s–1990s with its boat house and tennis courts, as well as merry-go-rounds. The park had a massive reconstruction in 2004, adding a cafe, carting, and various modern entertainments. It is located in the quiet area of the city, in the Leningradsky area, and is connected to the Lower Pond. Youth Recreation Park provides entertainment for all age groups. There is also Interpersonal Communications Development Central located in the park.

The Kaliningrad Zoo was opened as the Königsberg Zoo in 1896. The collection, which extends over 16.5 ha (40 acres), comprises 315 species with a total of 2,264 individual animals (as of 2005). The Kaliningrad Zoo is also an arboretum.

Centrally located in the city is Lower Pond, an artificial lake. Lower Pond is surrounded by a promenade and is an area for recreation, especially in summer. North of the Lower Pond is the larger Upper Pond in northern Kaliningrad.

== Culture ==
=== Museums ===
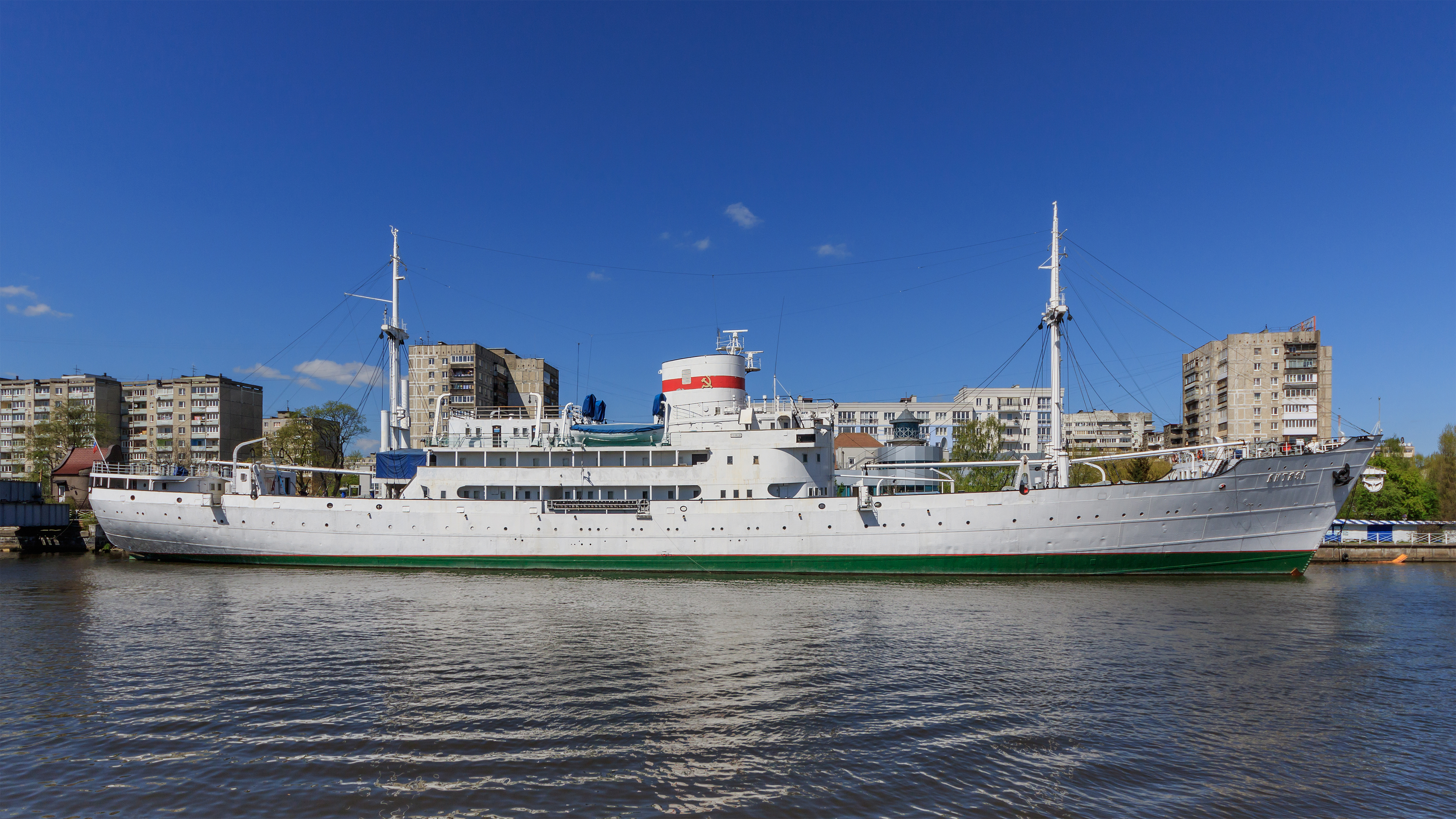
Museum ship "Vityaz" from the collection of the Museum of the World Ocean

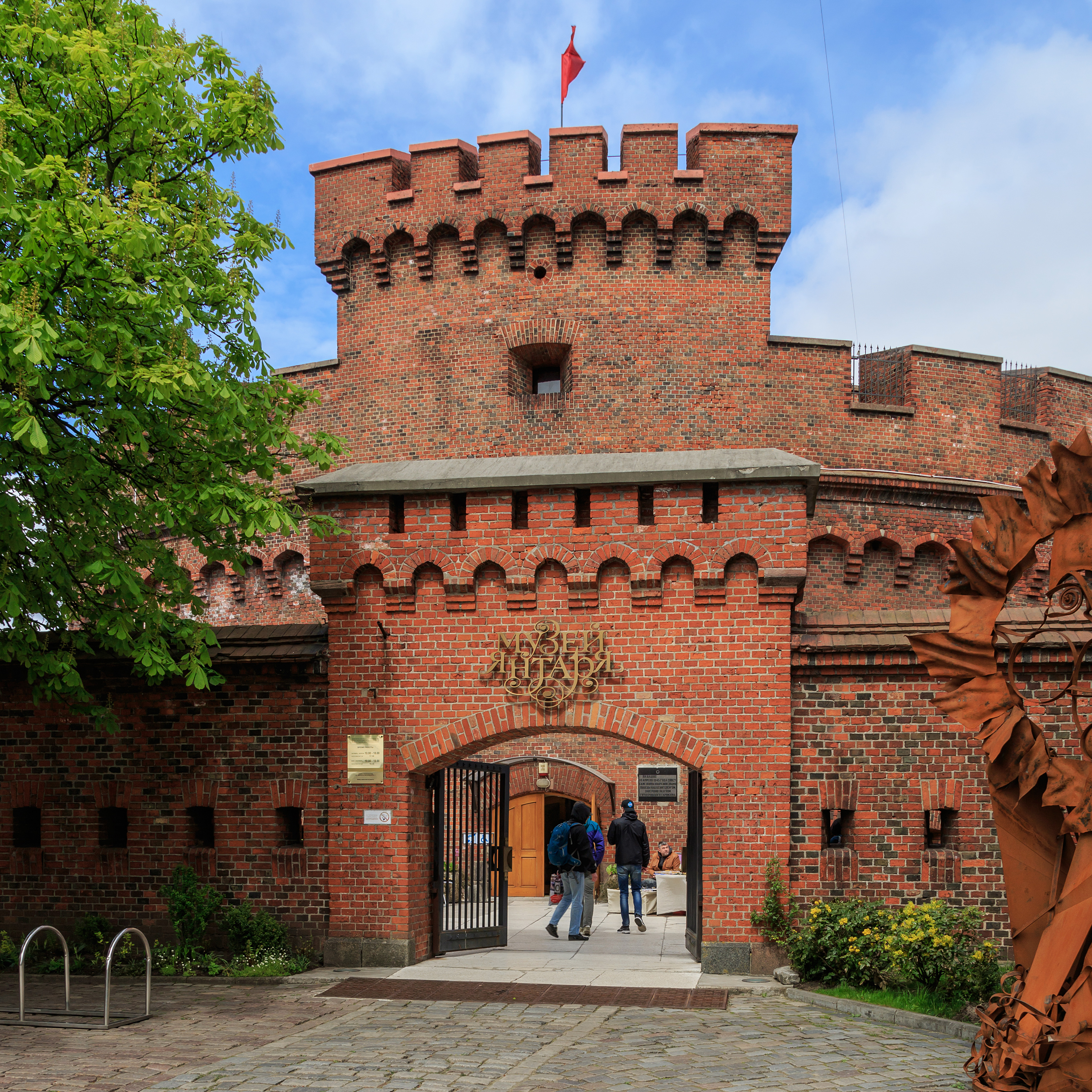
Kaliningrad Regional Amber Museum

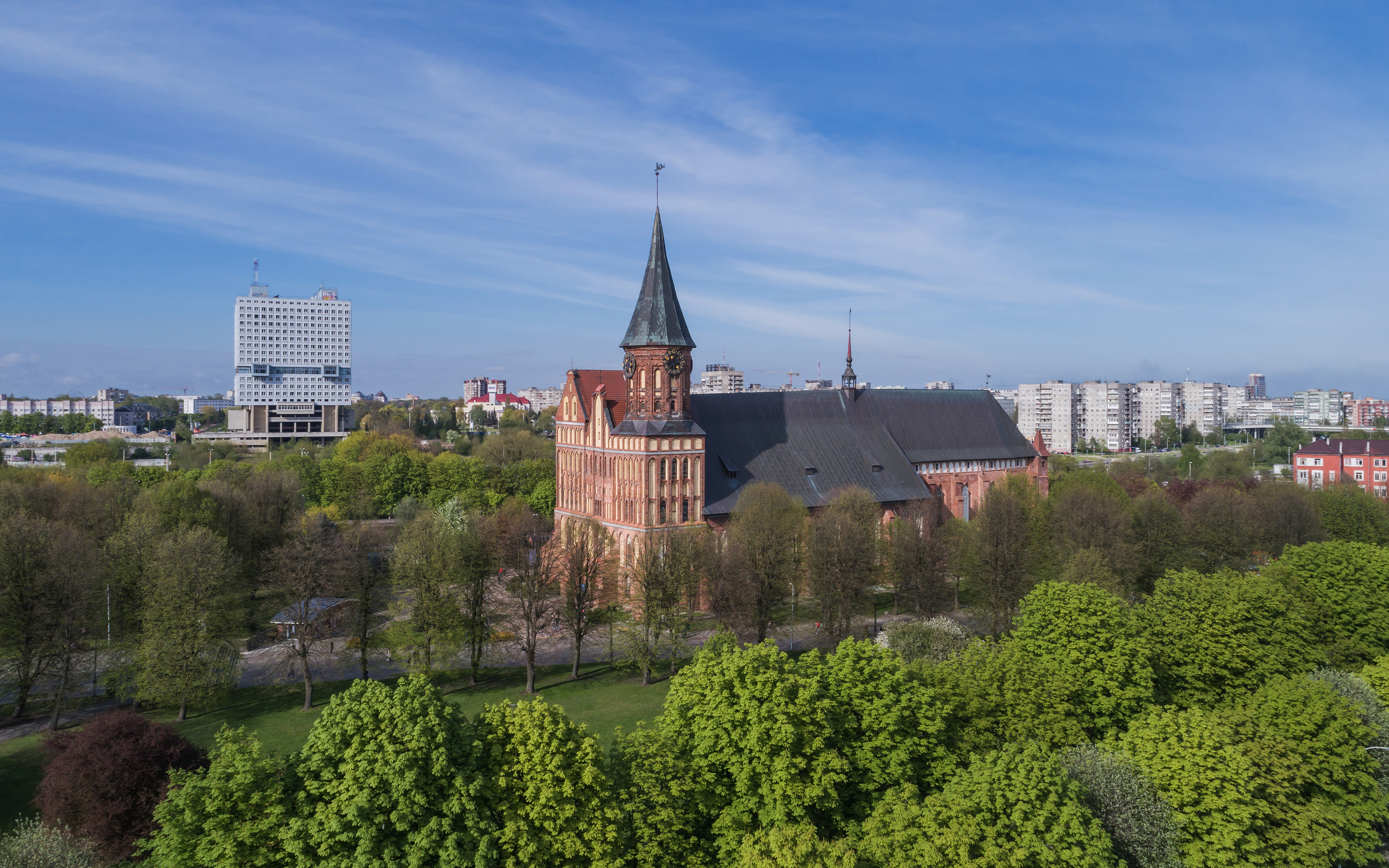
Königsberg Cathedral on Kneiphof island

Kaliningrad's museums were visited by roughly 920,000 people in 2013. In terms of museum attendance, the region of Kaliningrad ranks seventh among the regions of Russia. The Kaliningrad Regional Museum of History and Arts is the oldest museum in Kaliningrad, founded in 1946. In addition to the main building, the museum has four branches in Kaliningrad (including "Blindage" and "Fort No. 5") and two elsewhere in the region. In 1979, the Kaliningrad Regional Amber Museum was opened in the building of the Don, a former defensive tower. Initially, it was a branch of the Historical and Art Museum, but since 2004, it has operated independently. The Kaliningrad State Art Gallery, which opened in 1988, has exhibitions of domestic and foreign art in eight exhibition halls with a total exhibition area of more than 3,000 square metres (¾ acre). At the beginning of the 21st century, the Museum of the World Ocean, which was unique in Russia at the time, was gradually created, and now offers exhibitions and six museum vessels:

- Research ship-museum "Vityaz"
- Submarine B-413
- Space communication vessel "Cosmonaut Viktor Patsaev"
- Fishing boat-museum "SRT-129"
- Floating lighthouse "Irbensky"
- Icebreaker "Krassin" - moored in St. Petersburg.

The branches of the museum are the King's Gate and the preserved gate of Fort Friedrichsburg.

A museum of ancient archaeological finds has been created. It is located at the Friedland Gate, which itself is a monument of antiquity. In 2009, the Museum of E. T. A. Hoffmann, a famous writer born in Kaliningrad, was created. The museum is located in the building of the former Leningrad Cinema; now this building houses a regional music school named after Hoffman. In 2016, the Einstein Museum of Entertaining Sciences was opened on the first floor of the Mega-Market shopping centre, which offers interactive exhibits that illustrate various fields of science and demonstrate the manifestation of their laws. Other museums include the Kaliningrad State Art Gallery and the Friedland Gate Museum.

=== Theatres and concert halls ===
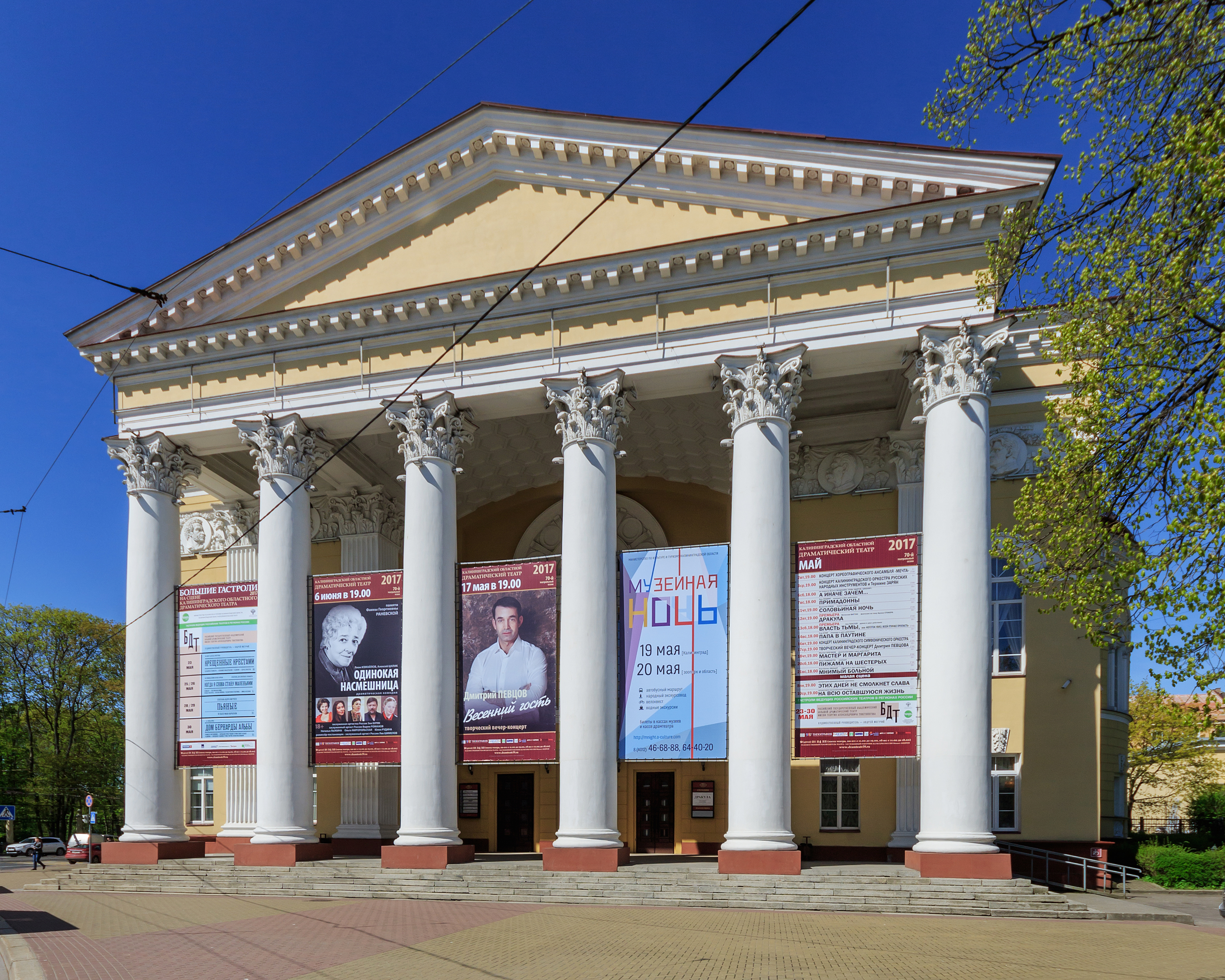
Kaliningrad Regional Drama Theater

There are several theatres in the city:

- Kaliningrad Regional Drama Theater;
- Kaliningrad Regional Musical Theatre;
- Kaliningrad Regional Puppet Theater;
- The organ hall of the Kaliningrad Regional Philharmonic is located in the historic building of the former Catholic Church of the Holy Family;
- A large concert hall with two organs located in the Königsberg Cathedral;
- The Variety Theatre, located in the House of Arts.

The musical life of the city is rich and diverse. Annual music festivals of various styles and trends are held throughout the year. Under the patronage of the Kaliningrad Regional Philharmonic Society, international festivals and competitions of classical, jazz, and organ music (dedicated to Johann Sebastian Bach and Mikael Tariverdiev) are held. Since 2006, the Don Cento Jazz International Jazz Festival has been held in the summer. The city also hosts two major rock festivals: the Night Wolves bike show (July) and Kaliningrad In Rock (August). The Baltic Seasons art festival is held annually.

In 2013, Kaliningrad's theatres were visited by almost 345,000 people.

=== Libraries ===
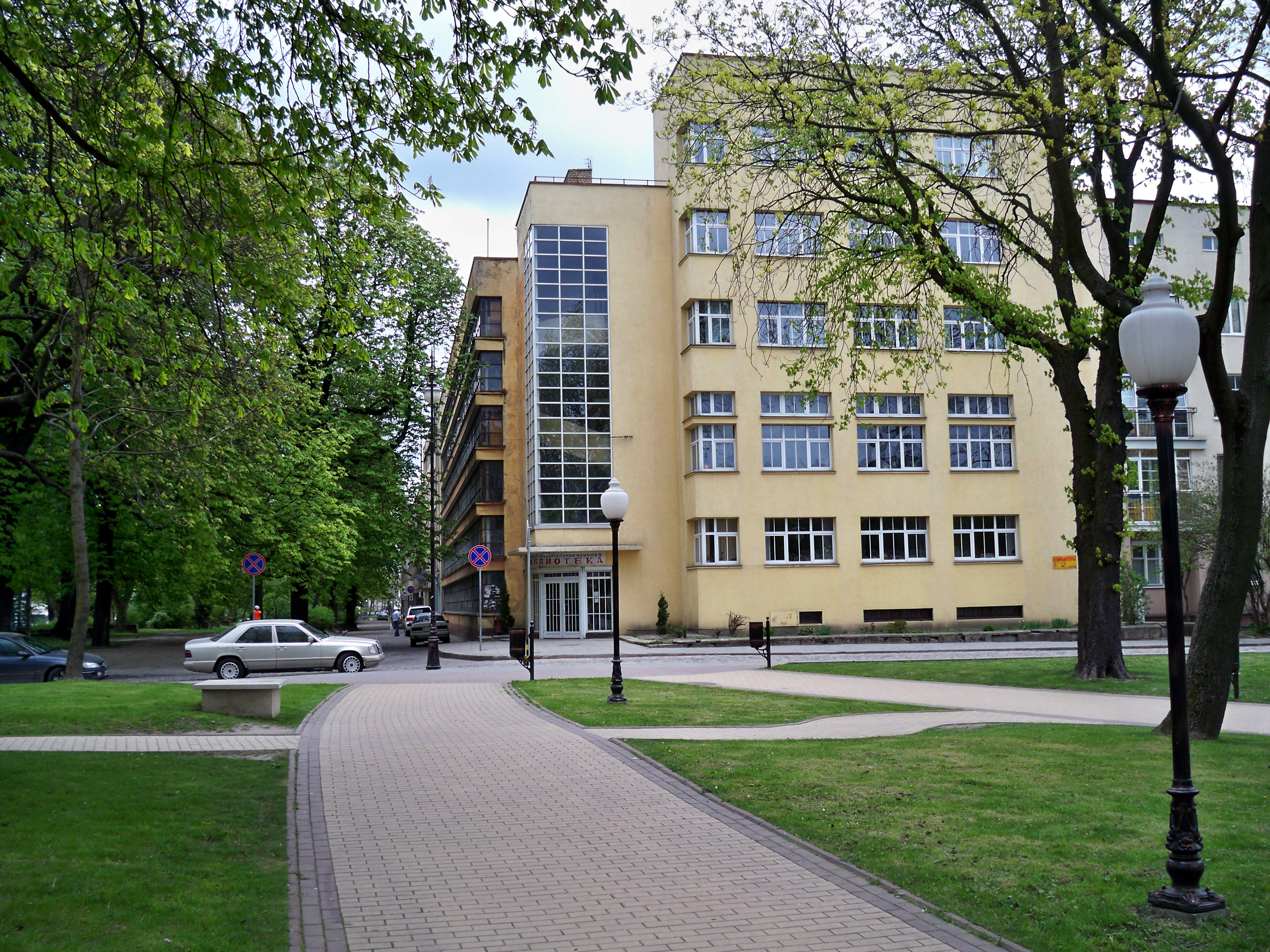
Kaliningrad Regional Scientific Library

- Kaliningrad Regional Scientific Library;
- Central City Library. A.P. Chekhov;
- Kaliningrad Regional Youth Library. V. Mayakovsky;
- Kaliningrad Regional Children's Library. A.P. Gaidar;
- Kaliningrad Regional Specialised Library for the Blind.

Also, there are 20 municipal city libraries in the city. As of 2015, more than 100 thousand residents of Kaliningrad regularly visit the city's libraries.

=== Music ===
The modern city of Kaliningrad is home to the Kaliningrad Regional Philharmonic and Symphony Orchestra, the Lik male chamber choir and the Garmonika Russian music ensemble, as well as the Kaliningrad Chamber Orchestra.

=== Cuisine ===
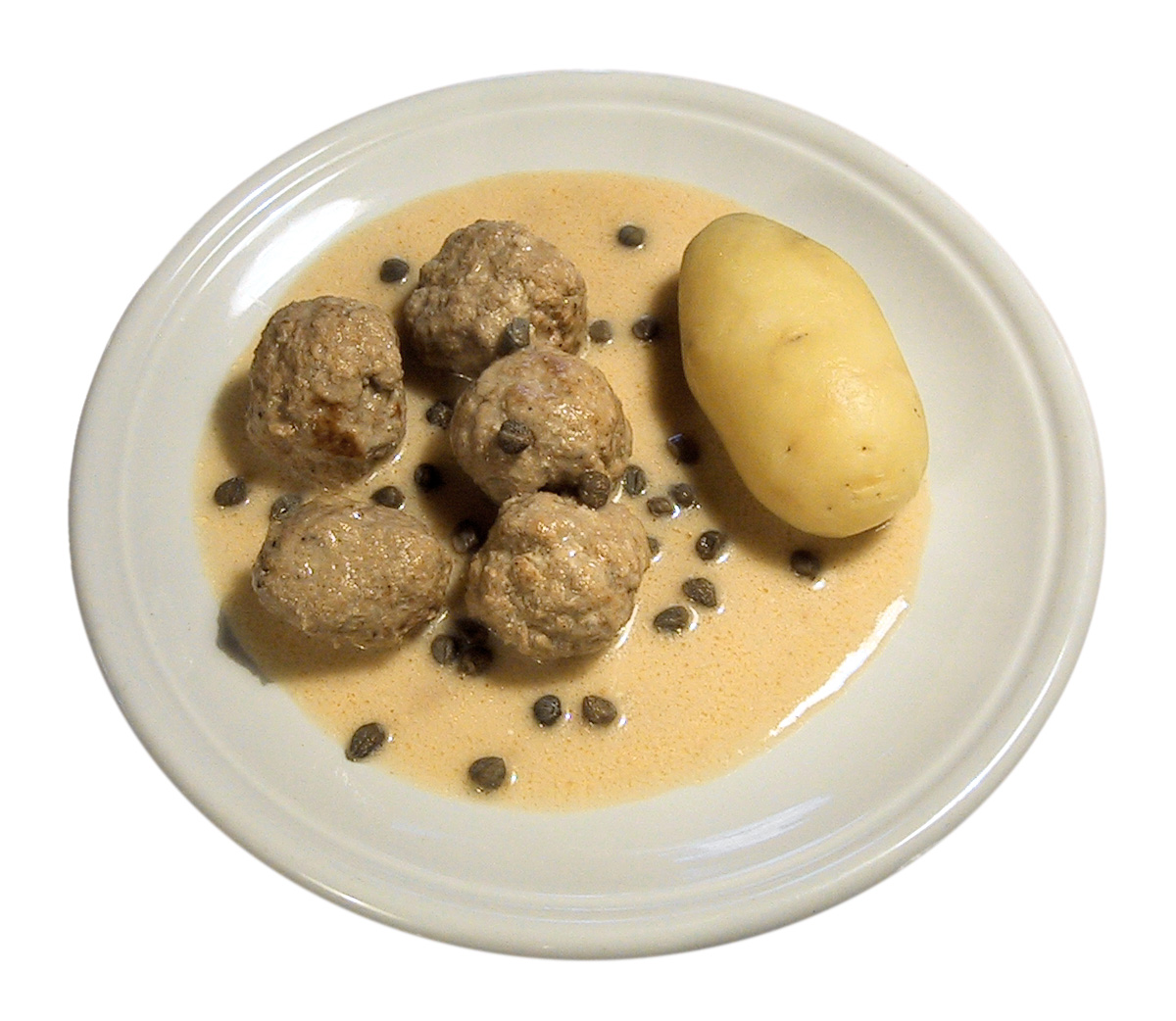
Königsberger Klopse are a Prussian speciality of meatballs in a white sauce with capers that can be found in many restaurants in Kaliningrad.

Kaliningrad has its own vodka and beer brands, Stari Königsberg and Ostmark respectively. Since the early 1990s, many new restaurants have opened in the city. These restaurants offer culinary specialities of former East Prussia, like Königsberger Klopse and Königsberg marzipan, and also fish and salad dishes, pizza and sushi. Königsberger Fleck, a bovine tripe soup and yet another culinary speciality from former Königsberg, no longer belongs to the culinary culture of Kaliningrad.

The people of Kaliningrad generally imported their respective culinary traditions to the region when they settled in the area after 1945. Okroshka may be served as in the rest of Russia. Many Italian and Asian restaurants (or fusions of both traditions) are in operation all over the city. Pizza and sushi are among the most popular dishes today. Fast food is widely available from various chains, including those of foreign origin. Shawarma is also gaining considerable prominence.

== Sports ==
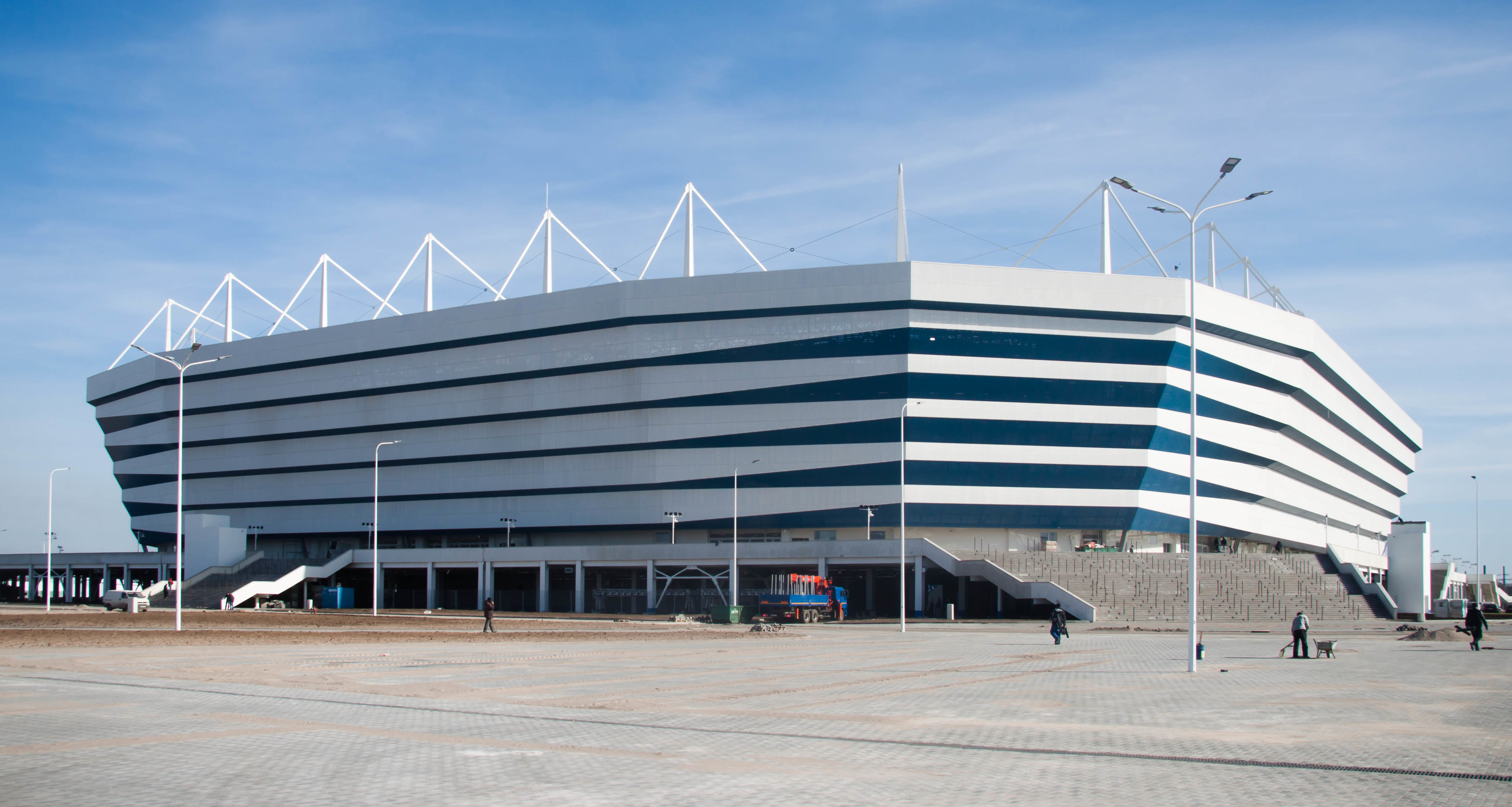
The Kaliningrad Stadium hosted the 2018 FIFA World Cup games

The Russian football club FC Baltika Kaliningrad is based in Kaliningrad and plays in the Russian Football National League. Their home stadium is the Kaliningrad Stadium, built for the 2018 FIFA World Cup

From 2006 to 2013, the Dynamo-Yantar men's volleyball club played in the Russian men's volleyball Championship. They played their home games at the Yantarny Sports Palace, which can accommodate over 7,000 spectators. From 2010, Yantarny had regularly hosted matches of the Russian men's national volleyball team in the FIVB Volleyball World League and the FIVB Volleyball World Grand Prix.

In the past, the city was also represented by the football clubs of West, Baltika-2 and FC Baltika-Tarko Kaliningrad, as well as the rugby club West Zvezda (winner of the 1994 Russian Cup, prize winner of the 1994 and 1995 Russian championships). The football club Volna Kaliningrad took part in the third tier of the 2000 Lithuanian championship, LF II Lyga, and won in the western zone (22 games: 20 wins, 2 draws, goal difference 101–9).

Since November 2013, the city has had an American football team called the Amber Hawks. In 2015, the Amber Hawks reached the semifinals of the Polish League 8x8. In 2016, Amber Hawks took the silver medal of the prestigious Eastern League of American Football (VLAF).

In June 2014, the Kaliningrad Regional Hockey League (KRHL) was created. League competition is the official championship of the Kaliningrad region of hockey.

In 2018, Kaliningrad hosted some games of the FIFA World Cup.

On 9 April 2018, the creation of a women's volleyball team, the "Lokomotiv Kaliningrad Region", was announced. At the end of the 2018–2019 season, the club took second place in the Russian Championship, losing one point to the leader team, the WVC Dynamo Moscow.

== Administrative and municipal status ==
Kaliningrad is the administrative centre of the oblast. Within the framework of administrative divisions, it is incorporated as the city of oblast significance of Kaliningrad — an administrative unit with status equal to that of the districts. As a municipal division, the city of oblast significance of Kaliningrad is incorporated as Kaliningrad Urban Okrug.

=== City districts ===
As of 2014, the city was divided into three administrative districts:

City district	Russian name	Inhabitants 2010 Census	Notes
Moskovsky	Московский	152,165	Named after the Russian capital, Moscow
Leningradsky	Ленинградский	159,771	Named after Leningrad, now Saint Petersburg
Tsentralny	Центральный	119,966	Lit. central, as it lies to the northwest of the historical city centre

Two administrative districts were abolished in June 2009:

City district	Russian name	Inhabitants 2002 Census	Notes
Baltiysky	Балтийский	68,664	Named after the Baltic Sea
Oktyabrsky	Октябрьский	43,252	Named after the October Revolution

== Authorities ==
=== Local government ===
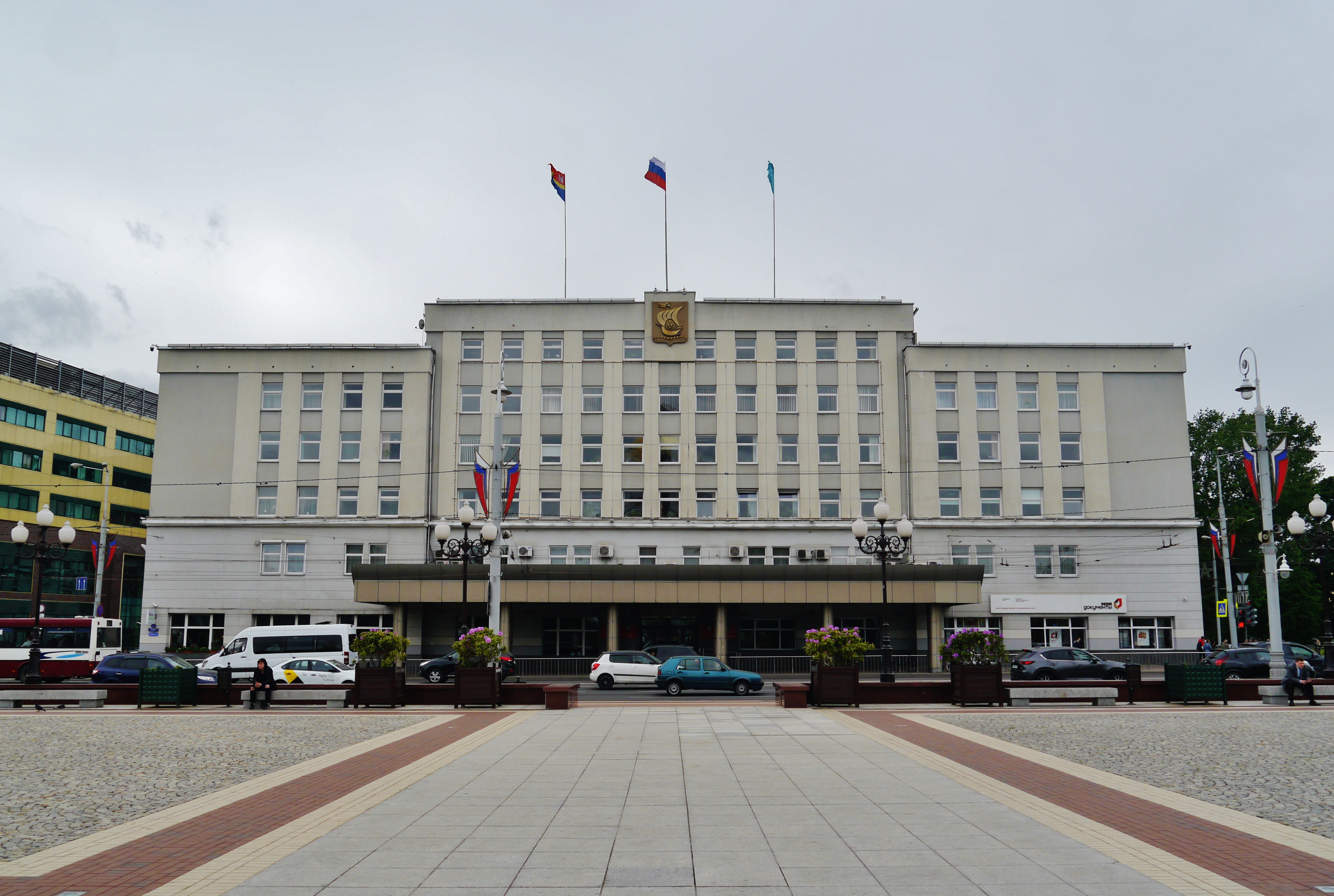
Kaliningrad City Hall in the Victory Square

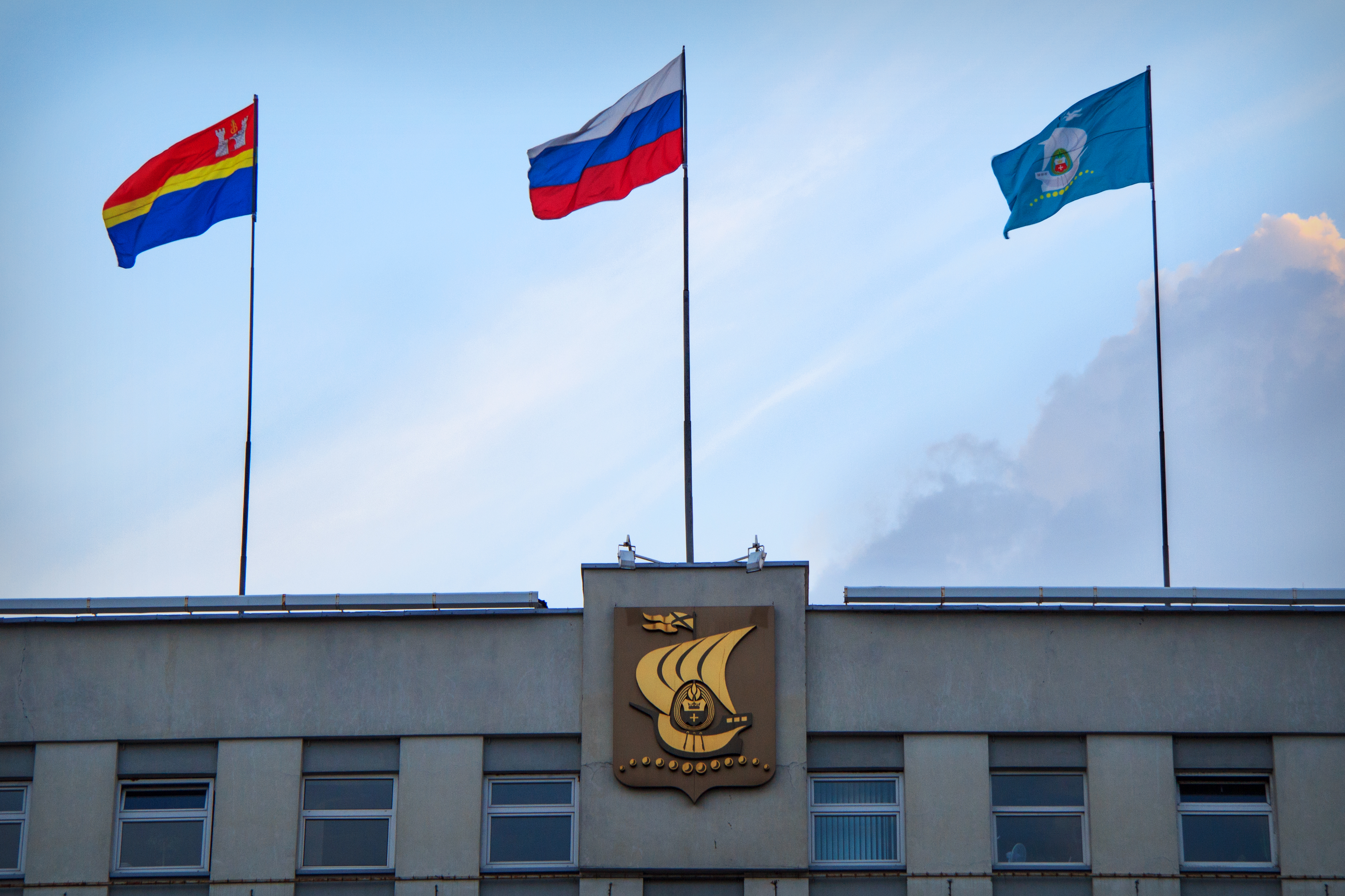
Flags of Russia (center), Kaliningrad Oblast (left), and Kaliningrad (right), over the City Hall

Local self-government in the city is carried out on the basis of the Charter, which was adopted by the City Council of Deputies of Kaliningrad on 12 July 2007.

Bodies and officials of local self-government in the city (formally, in the city district) of Kaliningrad are:

- Council of Deputies (representative body of a municipal formation);
- Head (chief executive);
- Administration (executive and administrative body of the municipality);
- Chamber of Control and Accounts.

The City Council of Deputies consists of 28 deputies elected by city residents in municipal elections according to a mixed mandate distribution system for a period of 5 years. The chairman of the Council is elected by deputies from among its members. The current 6th convocation was elected on 18 September 2016. The Chairman of the Council is Andrey Kropotkin from United Russia.

The head of the city heads the administration of the city district. Elected by the City Council of Deputies from among the candidates presented by the Competition Commission based on the results of the competition, for the term of office of the City Council of Deputies. Since April 2018, the head of the city is Alexey Silanov.

The Kaliningrad administration and the Council of Deputies are located in the building of the mayor's office at the Victory Square.

From 1996 to 2007, the Charter of the City of Kaliningrad, dated 25 September 1996, was in force in Kaliningrad, according to which the local self-government bodies were:

- The head of the city (mayor) – the highest official of the city;
- City hall (executive and administrative body);
- City Council of Deputies (representative body).

In 2007, due to the reform of local self-government, the functions of local self-government bodies were changed, and a new position was introduced – the head of the administration.

In 2008–2012, the local government body, carrying out executive and administrative functions, was the city district administration, headed by the head of the administration (city manager). The head of the administration was appointed to the post by the decision of the District Council of Deputies following a competition. On 14 May 2008, Felix Lapin was appointed to this position for a period of 2 years. On 15 June 2011, deputies of the Kaliningrad District Council approved Svetlana Mukhomor as head of the city administration (she is the first deputy head of the city administration).

In November 2016, the Kaliningrad Regional Duma adopted a law abolishing direct elections for the mayor of Kaliningrad. The elections were replaced by the selection procedure of candidates by a competition commission from which the city Council of Deputies selects one by secret ballot. In 2018, out of ten people who submitted documents for participation in the competition, only three were admitted to the competition.

=== Regional government ===
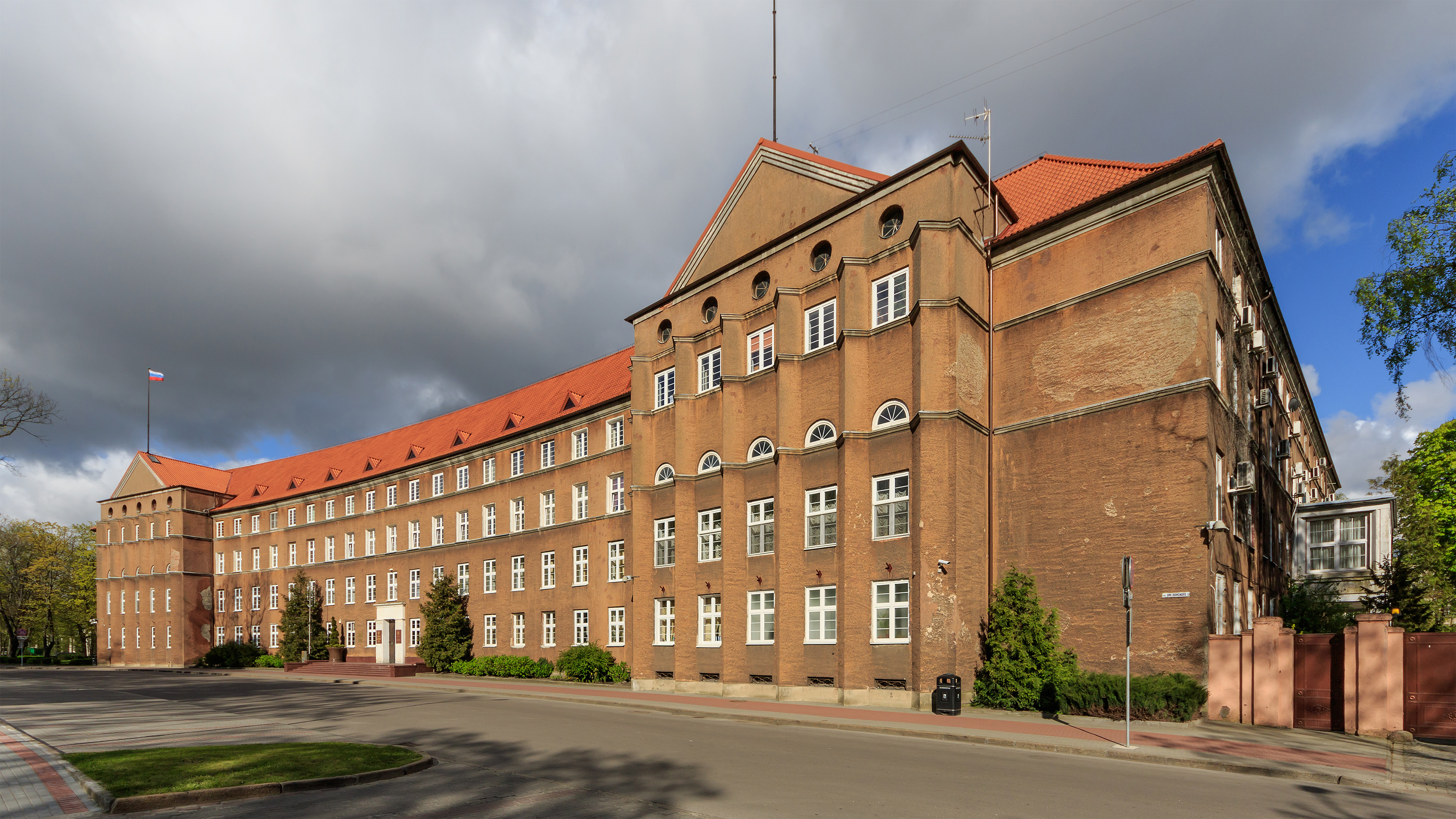
Building of the Government and Administration of the Governor of Kaliningrad Oblast

All legislative, executive and judicial authorities of Kaliningrad Oblast are located in Kaliningrad. The Government of Kaliningrad Oblast and the Governor's Administration are located in the same building on Dmitry Donskoy Street, the Kaliningrad Regional Duma on Kirov Street, the Kaliningrad Regional Court on Sergeeva Street, and the Arbitration Court of Kaliningrad Oblast on Rokossovsky Street.

=== Federal government ===
In Kaliningrad, there are representative offices of federal authorities in the region:

- Prosecutor's Office of Kaliningrad Oblast;
- Investigation Department of the Investigative Committee of Russia;
- Ministry of Internal Affairs of Kaliningrad Oblast;
- Ministry of Emergency Situations;
- Military Commissariat;
- Kaliningrad Regional Customs of the North-West Customs Department of the Federal Customs Service of Russia;
- Branch of the Pension Fund of the Russian Federation;
- Management of the federal postal service - branch of FSUE "Russian Post";
- Branch of the Social Insurance Fund of the Russian Federation.

== Economy ==
In 1996, Kaliningrad was designated a Special Economic Zone, referred to as FEZ Yantar. Manufacturers based there get tax and customs duty breaks on the goods they send to other parts of Russia. Although corruption was an early deterrent, that policy means the region is now a manufacturing hub. One in three televisions in Russia is made in Kaliningrad (including Ericsson brand by Telebalt Ltd. and Polar by an eponymous firm located in the city of Chernyakhovsk), and it is home to Cadillac and BMW related car plants (produced by Avtotor). Kaliningrad is also the location of the ITAR Distillery. Kaliningrad's major industries are manufacturing, shipping, fishing and amber products. In 2006, Moscow declared it would turn the region into "the Russian Hong Kong".

== Transport ==
=== Roads ===
Kaliningrad is a major transport hub. The most important roads of the city are:

- Kaliningrad – Chernyakhovsk–Nesterov to the Lithuania–Russia border (on to Vilnius, Minsk, route M1 "Belarus") It is a part of the branches of the trans-European transport corridors No. 1-A "Riga–Kaliningrad–Gdansk" and No. 9-D "Kiev–Minsk–Vilnius–Kaliningrad", and;
- Kaliningrad – Gvardeisk – Neman to the Lithuania–Russia border (on to Šiauliai, Jelgava, Riga). The route from the village – Talpaki, through Bolshakovo to Sovetsk. It is a part of the branch of the trans-European transport corridor No. 1-A "Riga–Kaliningrad–Gdansk".;
- Kaliningrad – Mamonovo. Through Ladushkin to the Poland-Russia border (to Elbląg, Gdańsk). and;
- Kaliningrad – Polessk. It follows through the village. Bolshakovo (further to Sovetsk);
- Kaliningrad – Zelenogradsk. (further along the Curonian Spit to Nida and Klaipėda);
- Kaliningrad – Baltiysk. The road runs through Primorsk;
- Kaliningrad – Bagrationovsk. Leads to the Polish border (further to Olsztyn).

In December 2007, construction began on the Primorskoye Koltso highway, which connects Kaliningrad with Svetlogorsk, Pionersky, Zelenogradsk and Khrabrovo Airport. It is planned to continue construction at Baltiysk, Svetly.

Around the city (from the village of A. Kosmodemyansky to the traffic intersection with Moskovsky Prospekt) passes the route of the northern and southern bypasses of Kaliningrad. Until now, on the western side of the city of Kaliningrad, the "ring" of the road has not been closed due to the absence of a 7-kilometer (4.3-mile) crossing through the Vistula Lagoon.

=== Water ===
Kaliningrad is home to the westernmost and the only non-freezing port of Russia and the Baltic states on the Baltic Sea. Freight and passenger ferry crossings connect the Port of Kaliningrad and its outport, the Port of Baltiysk, with Saint Petersburg, and the ports of Germany and Sweden.

As of April 2019, only a freight ferry operates on the Baltiysk–Ust-Luga route, and the passenger ferry has been cancelled.

=== Air ===
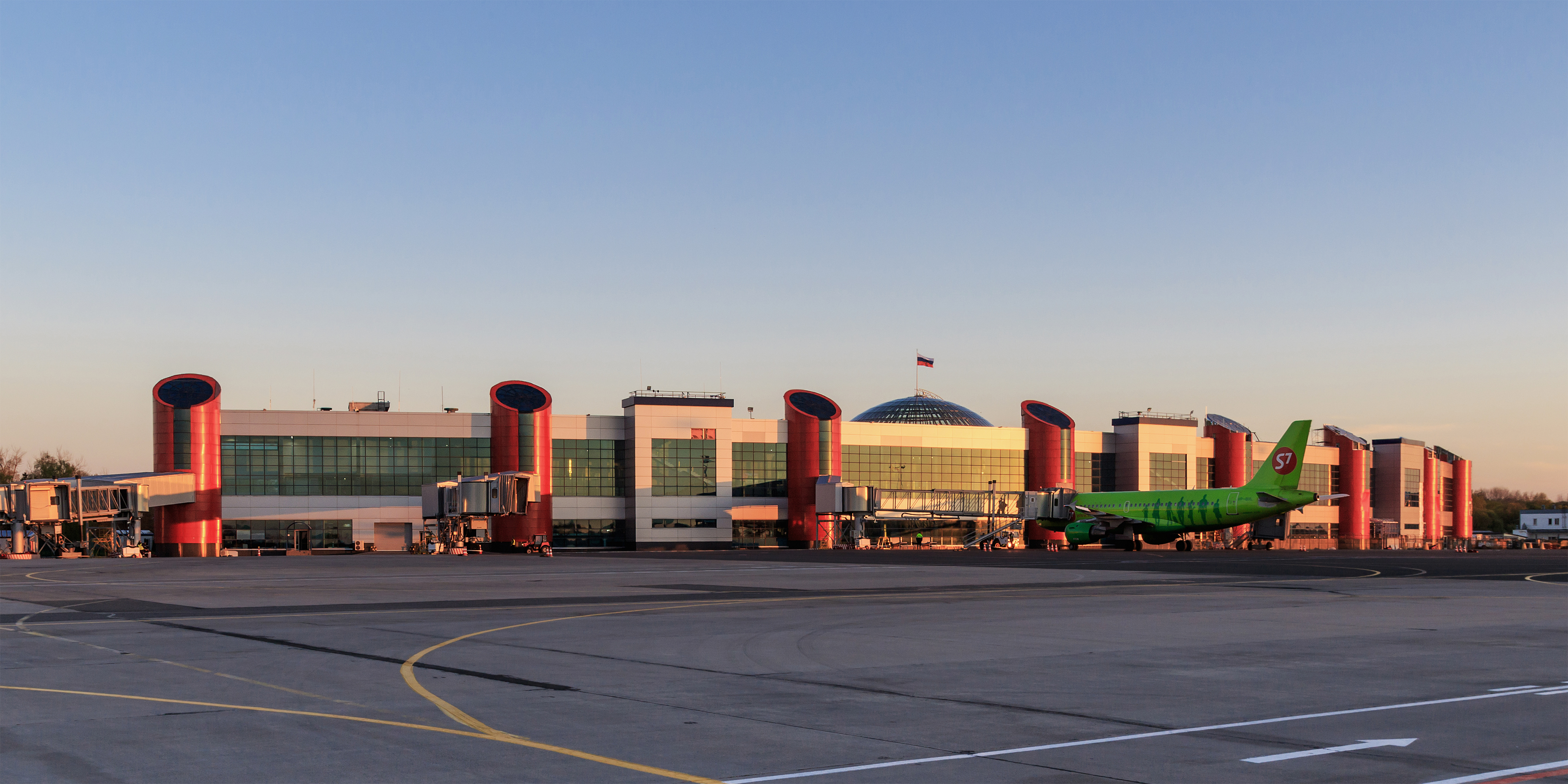
Khrabrovo Airport

The Kaliningrad Devau Airport, which opened in 1919, was one of the first civilian airports in the world, and the first in Germany. In 1922, the first planes of the Moscow-Riga-Königsberg, the first international airline of the Soviet Union, arrived in Königsberg for the first time. After World War II, the airport was used for local flights until the 1970s.

In the 1950s, a new airport, the Khrabrovo Airport, was built on the base of a military airfield 24 kilometers (15 miles) from the city. Now it has international status. The Kaliningrad airline KD Aviation was based at Khrabrovo, which ceased operations in September 2009. The reconstruction of the airport was completed in 2018. On 1 October 2022, the airport began allowing more flights from international destinations, including through operation by foreign airlines.

=== Railway ===
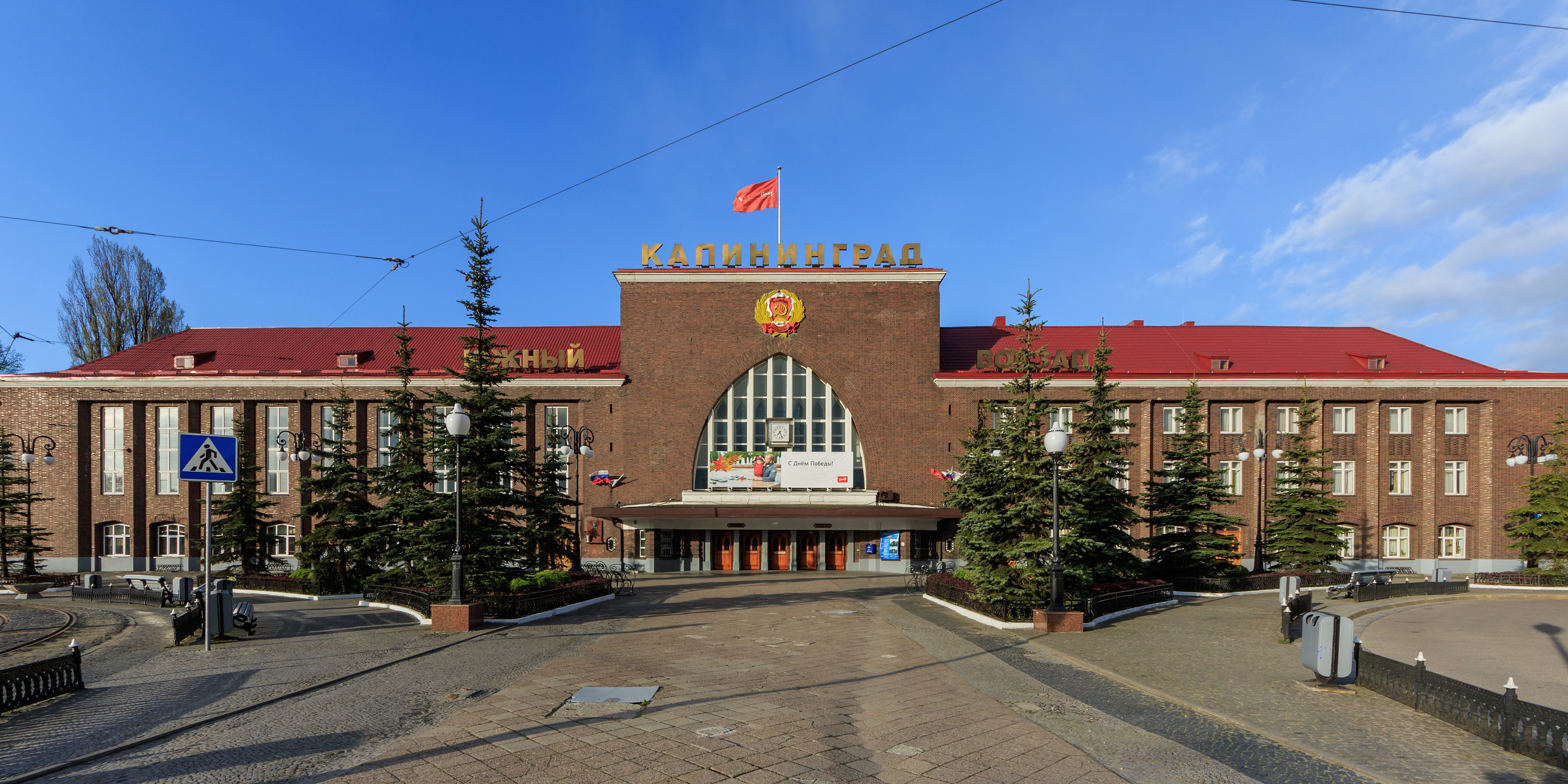
Kaliningrad South railway station

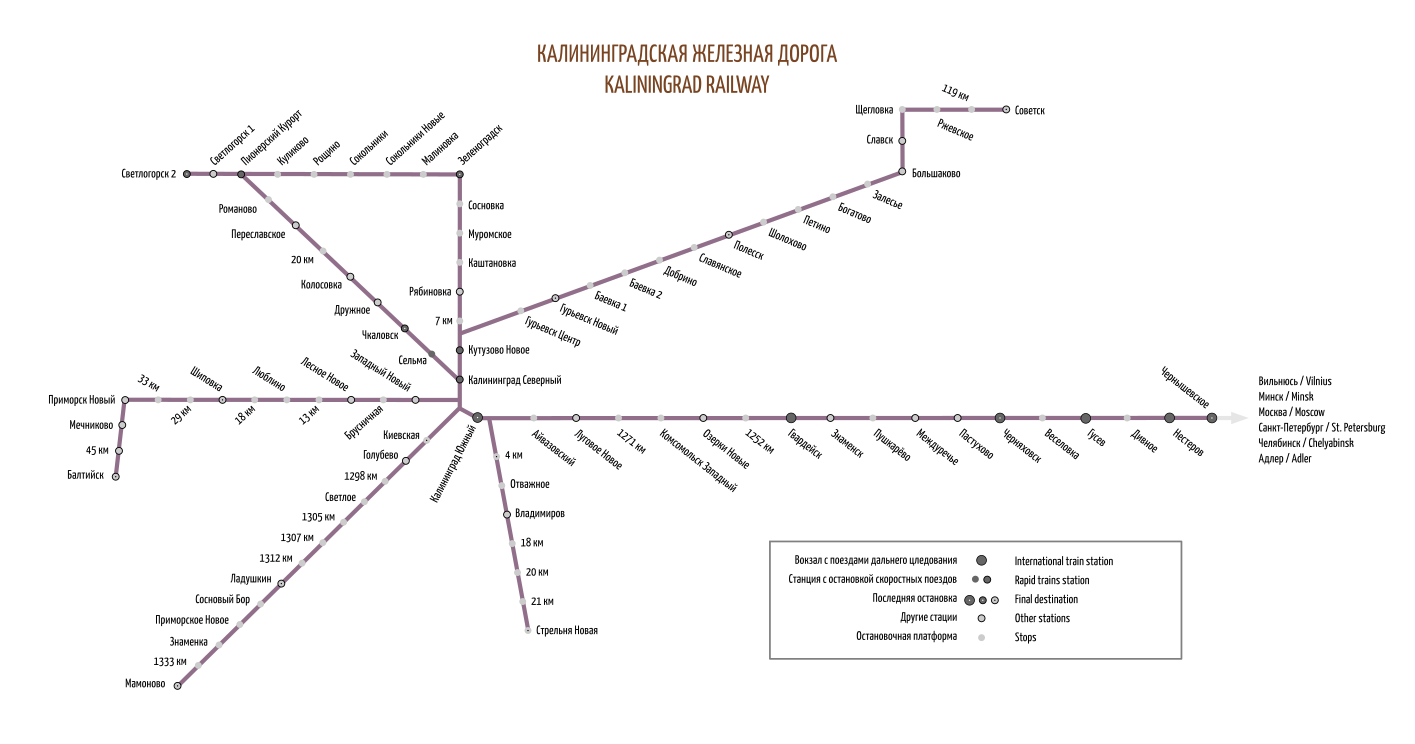
Railway network in Kaliningrad Oblast

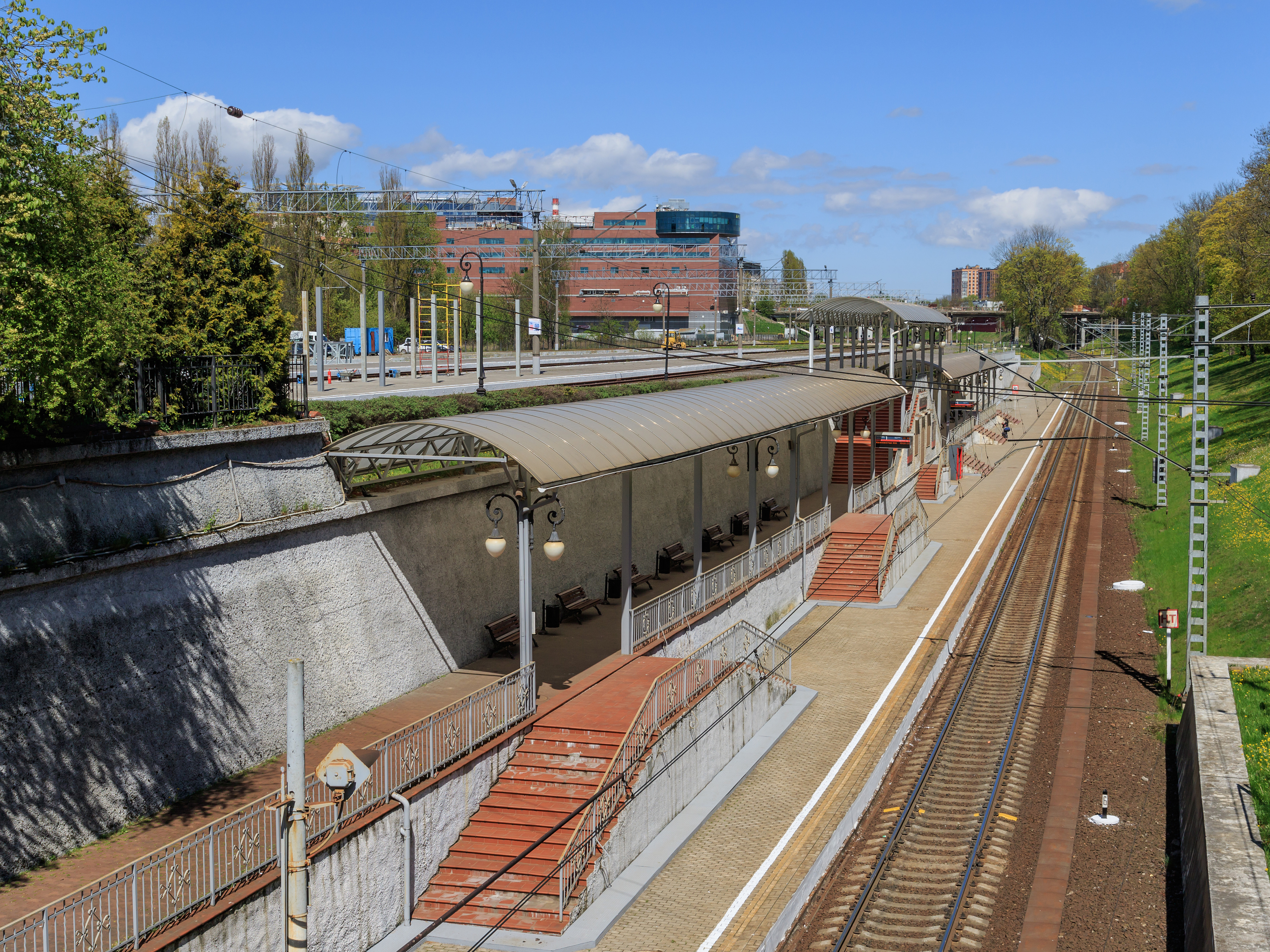
Kaliningrad North railway station

Kaliningrad is the most important hub of the railway network of the Kaliningrad Oblast. It is the site of the Kaliningrad Railway. The main passenger railway station of the city is the Kaliningrad South railway station, which includes the main railway station of the city and the Oblast–Yuzhny station. It serves both commuter and long-distance trains following from Kaliningrad:

- No. 30 Moscow "Yantar";
- No. 80 St. Petersburg;
- No. 148 Moscow (summer);
- No. 360 Adler;
- No. 426 Chelyabinsk (summer).

The Berlin-Kaliningrad direct train (via Poland) operated from 1993 to 2000, then was replaced by a through carriage, which was part of the Kaliningrad-Gdynia train from December 2003 to December 2009 and in 2010–2013 (in the summer), with a re-railer in the Polish city of Tczew. A platform with a European Standard Gauge track was specially equipped to receive these trains, allowing trains to run on this route without the interruption of a bogie exchange at some point on the journey.

Kaliningrad North railway station serves trains connecting Kaliningrad with the seaside resorts of the city, Svetlogorsk and Pionersky, as well as the city of Sovetsk. It is a major transport hub in the public transport system of Kaliningrad.

Other railway stations located in the city:

- Kutuzovo-Novoye (Alexander Nevsky Street District);
- Chkalovsk-Western (McK Chkalovsk);
- West New (Wagon Street District);
- Forest-Novoya (McN named after Alexander Kosmodemyansky);
- Dzerzhinskaya-Novaya (Dzerzhinsky Street district, there is a European (standard gauge) track);
- Aivazovsky stop (in the area of Aivazovsky and Yamskaya streets);
- Kyiv stop (Kievskaya Street district, near the Baltic market);
- Selma stop (General Chelnokov Street and Selma Market);
- Stop point 4 kilometres (Muromskaya Street District, Southern);
- Brusnichny Stop (Brusny street district).

=== Inter-city and international bus service ===
Regular bus routes connect Kaliningrad with Belarus, Ukraine, Lithuania, Latvia, Estonia, Poland, the Czech Republic and Germany.

There are two bus stations in the city. The "old" bus station is located on Kalinin Square, next to the Kaliningrad-Passazhirskiy railway station and is used primarily for intra-regional transportation.

Due to the conflict with the station directorate, the Königavto road carrier stopped using this bus station and set up its own international bus station at the end of Moskovsky Prospekt. More than 90% of regular international bus services depart from it.

=== Urban public transport ===
Public transport in Kaliningrad is represented by a bus, a trolleybus, a tram, a taxi, and the city's railway lines. On 21 March 2010, a new public transport scheme came into effect.

The tram network in Kaliningrad has been in existence since 1895 and is the oldest tram system in Russia. It has a track width of 1,000 mm (3 ft 3 in). Until 2000, at least ten city tram routes operated in Kaliningrad; however, over the past twenty years, the route network has been significantly reduced. By the beginning of 2013, only two routes were operating in the city. In 2015, after changing the traffic pattern at the Kaliningrad South railway station, the last tram route, No. 5, remained. In accordance with the newly adopted General Plan of Kaliningrad until 2035, the construction of a tram line with a separate traffic section in the Moskovsky District is envisaged.

The first trolleybuses appeared in Königsberg in 1943, but after the war, they decided not to restore the trolleybus system. The modern trolleybus system of the city has been operating since 5 November 1975. During this time, the route network in Kaliningrad has repeatedly changed. After the repair of the overpass on Pobedy Avenue, carried out in the summer of 2018, route No. 6 was discontinued. As a result, three operating trolleybus lines remained in the city, although the new route scheme for public transport, adopted on 1 August 2016, provided for six routes. The general plan of the city until 2035 also provides for the development of the trolleybus network in Kaliningrad.

==== Railbus ====
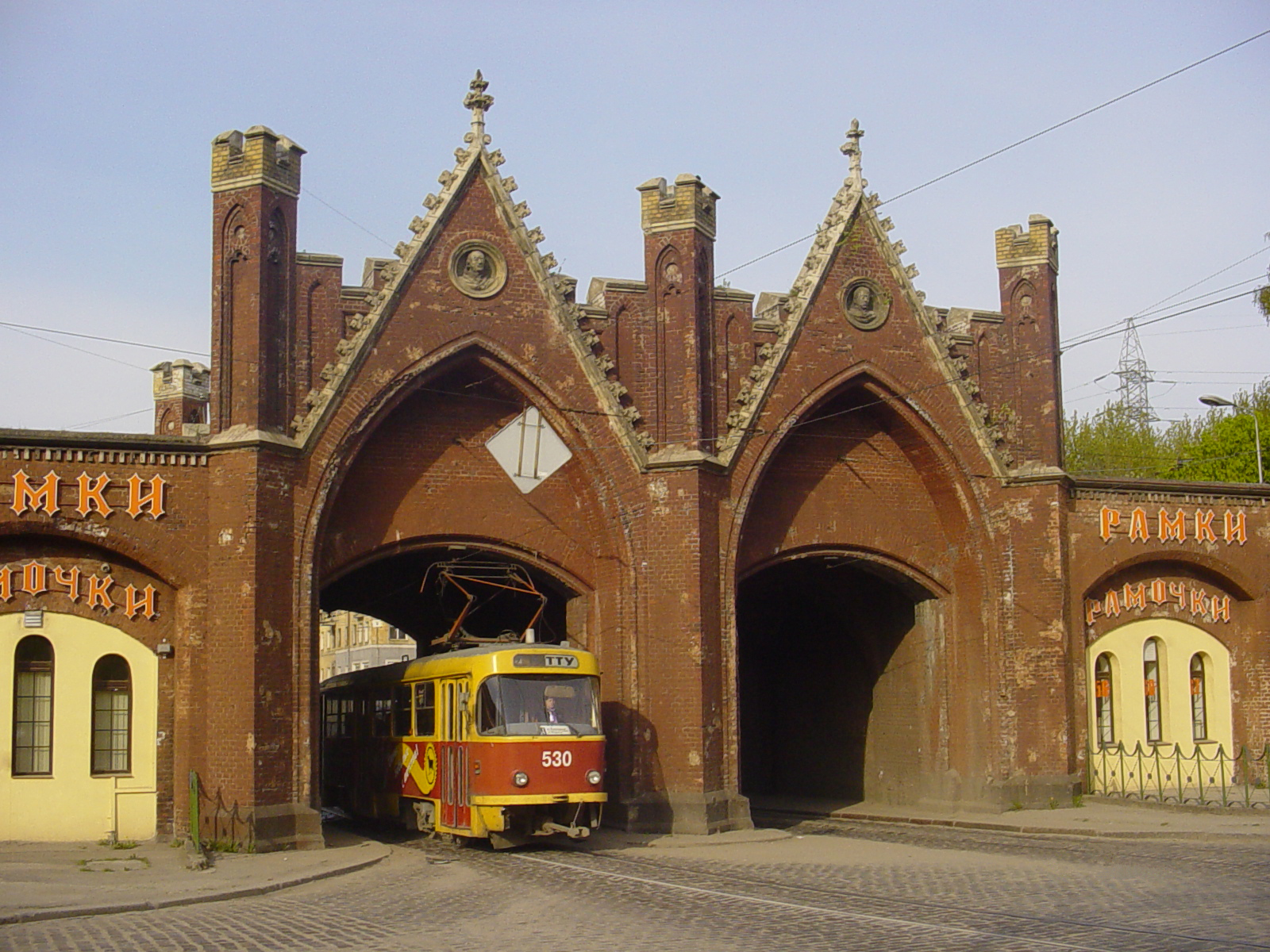
A Tatra T4 Tram passing through the Brandenburg Gate

On 26 March 2014, the first line of the city rail bus was launched in Kaliningrad, serving the route from the Kievskaya platform in the Moskovsky district to the Kaliningrad North railway station. At the same time, a bus line was organised connecting Oleg Koshevoy Street with the Kievskaya platform. The opening of several more lines of the city railway has been announced, which should connect the center of Kaliningrad with the peripheral districts of the city.

In December 2016, the mayor of Kaliningrad, Alexander Yaroshuk, announced that from 1 January 2017 the city rail bus would be canceled due to its unprofitability. After that, Governor Anton Alikhanov made an operational decision to subsidize the rail bus from the regional budget.

In early January 2017, the press service of the Kaliningrad Railway announced that it was planned to extend the rail bus line to Chkalovsk.

On 9 January 2017, city trains were launched on the Kaliningrad-Guryevsk route, and on the Kaliningrad-Lesnoye Novoe route from 3 September 2018.

As of the end of 2018, rail buses serve four intra-city lines connecting peripheral sleeping areas and the satellite city of Guryevsk with the centre of Kaliningrad. Kaliningrad North railway station is a major transport and interchange hub, where many public transport routes converge. Passengers are transported by rail buses of the RA1 and RA2 models, manufactured by Metrovagonmash. City trains run on weekdays during the morning and evening rush hours.

=== Bridges ===
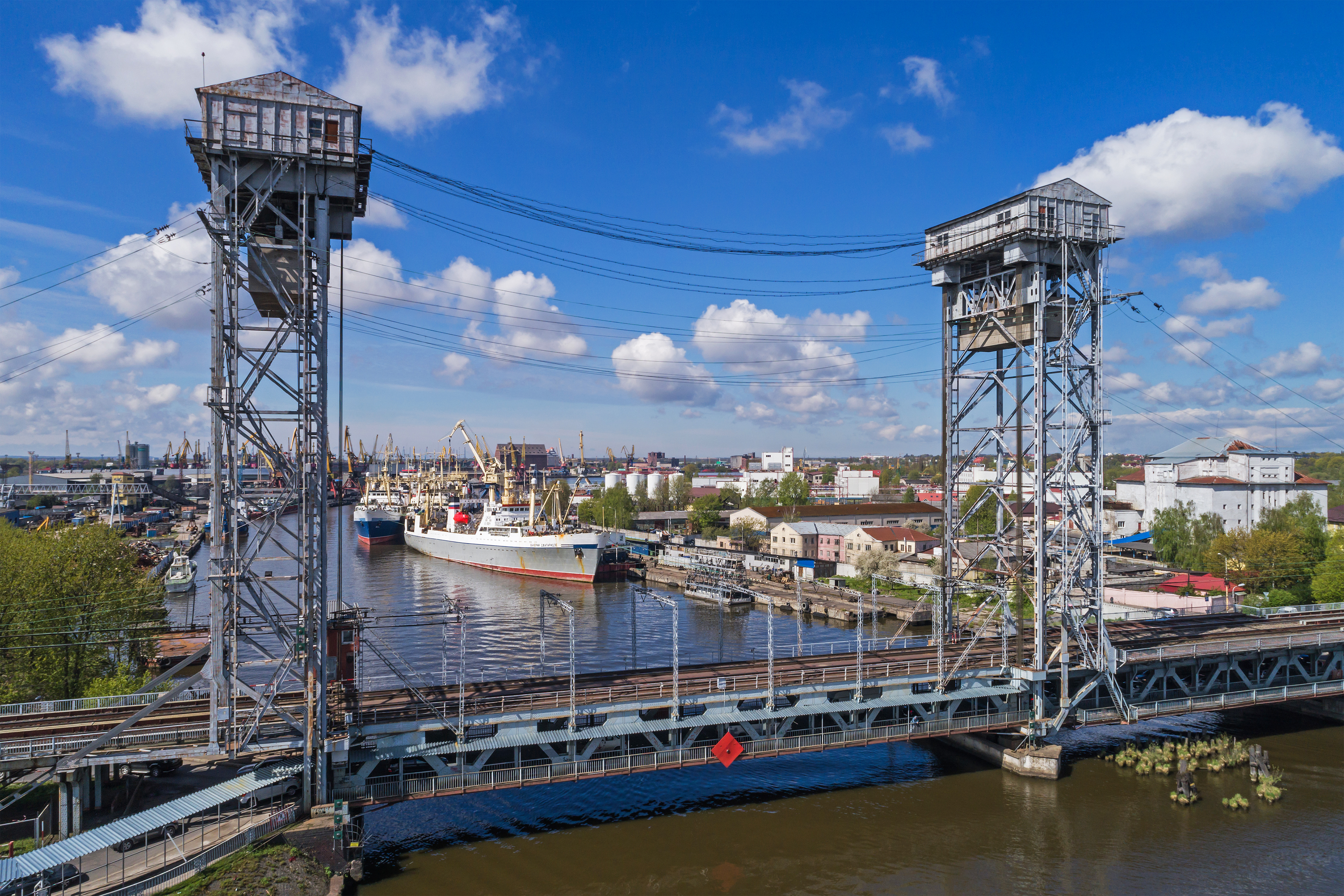
The Two-tiered Bridge

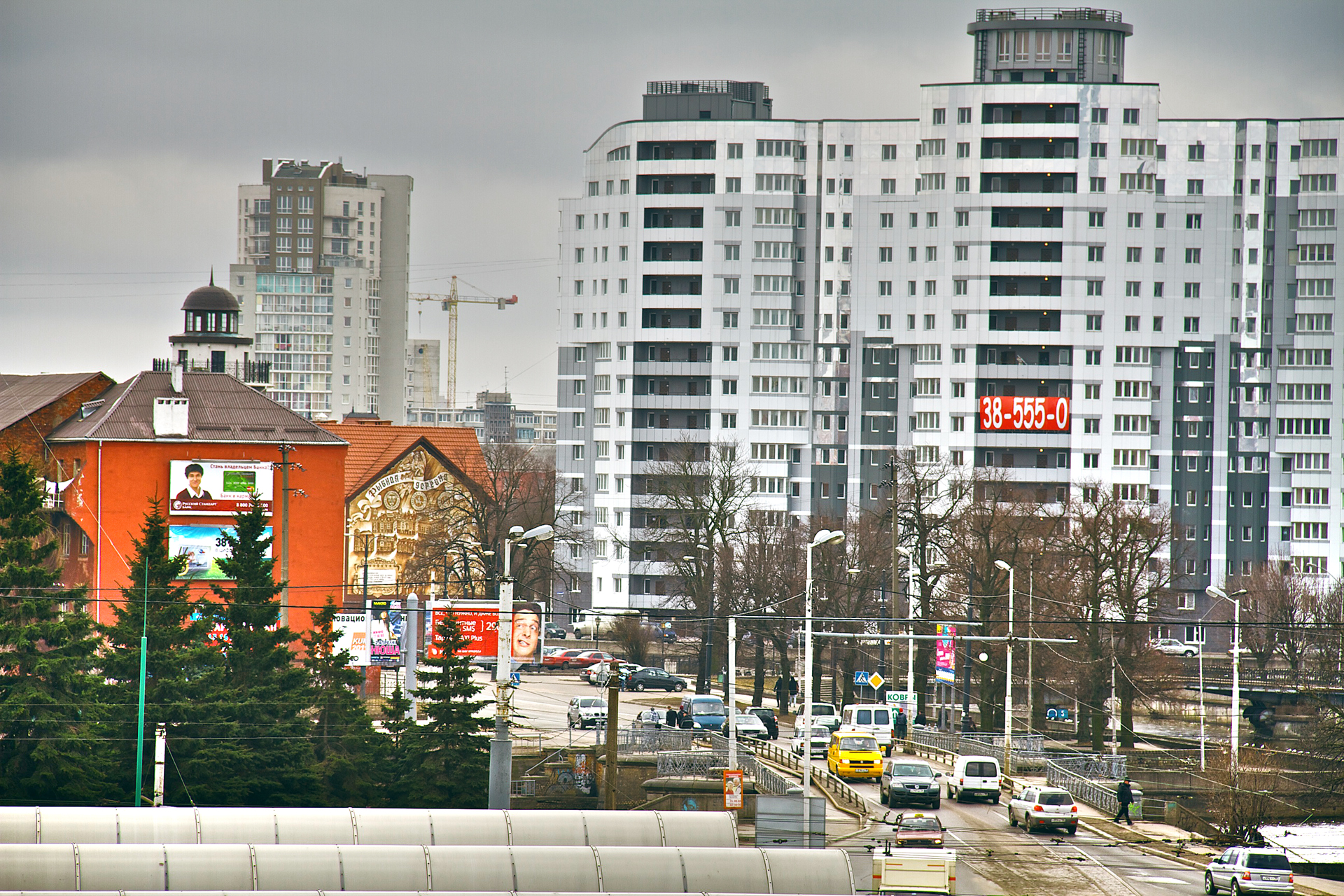
The Wooden Bridge

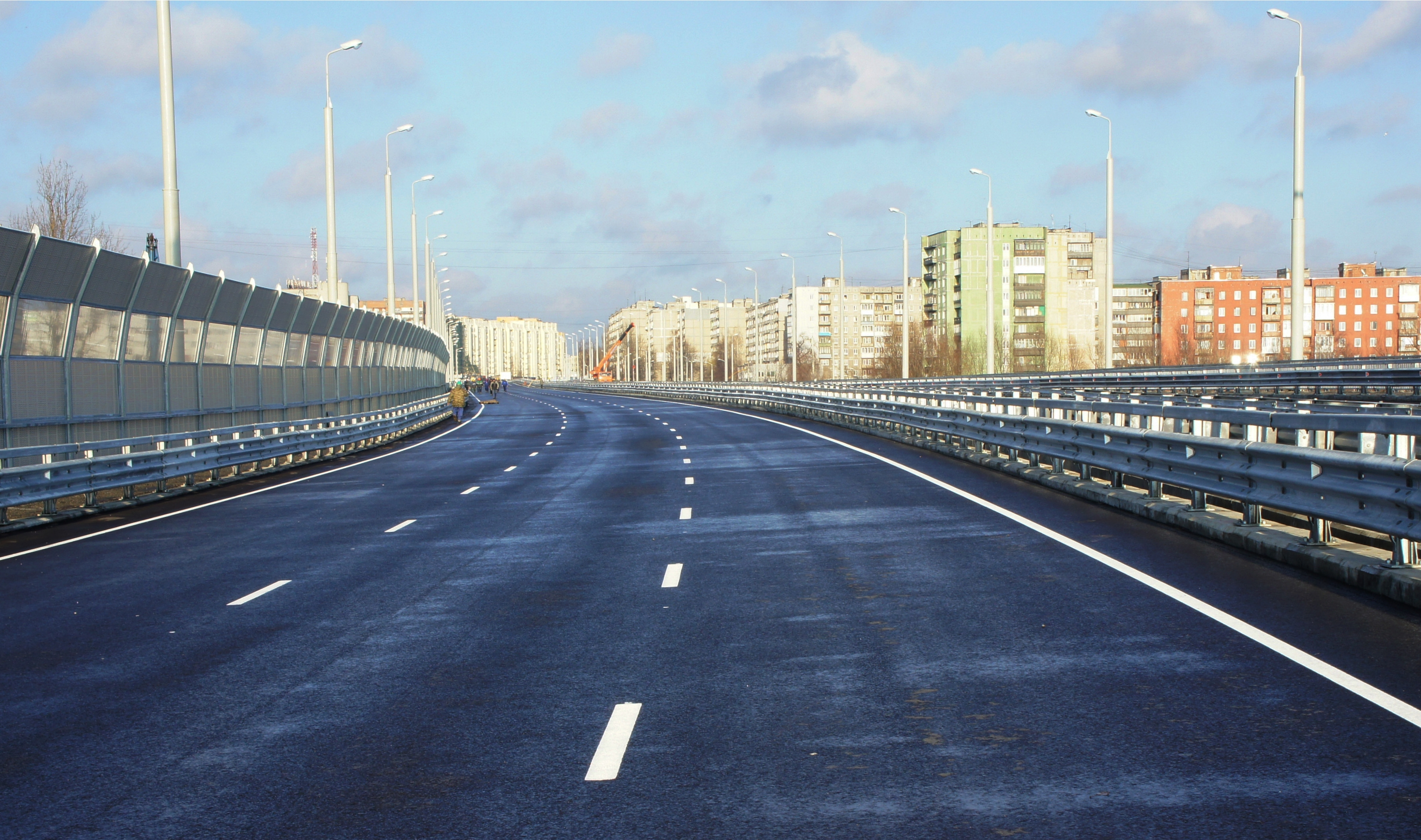
Second Overpass Bridge

The branches of the Pregolya River divide the city into four parts. The majority of the city (Tsentralny Administrative District and Leningradsky Administrative District) is located north of the river, Moskovsky Administrative District is south of the river. Kant Island (Kneiphof) and Oktyabrsky Administrative District (Lomse) are located between the branches of the river.

There are eight active bridges across the Pregolya and one dismantled bridge in Kaliningrad:

- The Two-tiered bridge is a drawbridge that connects General Butkov (northern bank) and Zheleznodorozhnaya (southern bank) streets. Divorced by raising the middle span. The upper tier of the bridge is occupied by a railway, the lower tier by the carriageway and pedestrian sidewalks. The double-deck bridge is the only existing railway bridge across the Pregolya in Kaliningrad;
- Trestle bridge - thrown over both branches of the Pregolya and passes over Kneiphof, is part of the Leninsky Prospekt, built in 1972, to replace two of the seven Königsberg bridges - Lavochny and Zeleny. There is a pedestrian descent from the bridge to the island and an automobile exit to Moskovsky Prospekt. There is no road exit to the island. The bridge is crossed by routes of all types of public transport;
- The Wooden Bridge is a drawbridge, one of the seven bridges in Königsberg. Connects Moskovsky Prospekt with Oktyabrsky Island (Oktyabrskaya st.). There are two tram routes across the bridge;
- The Honey Bridge is a drawbridge, one of the seven bridges of Königsberg. Connects Oktyabrsky Island and Kneiphof. Since the Kneiphof is a pedestrian zone, the de facto bridge is also exclusively pedestrian. From time to time, the bridge is used by official vehicles (delivery of materials for the restoration of the Königsberg Cathedral, as well as for the passage of wedding cortèges);
- Jubilee Bridge - drawbridge, pedestrian, connects Oktyabrsky Island (Rybnaya village area) with St. Epronovskaya. Built in 2005 on the pillars of the old Imperial Bridge, destroyed during World War II;
- The High Bridge is one of the seven bridges in Königsberg. Connects st. Oktyabrskaya (Oktyabrsky Island) from st. Dzerzhinsky. A tram line runs across the bridge;
- Berlin (Palmburg) Bridge is part of the Kaliningrad ring road, it is thrown across both channels of the Pregolya. Farthest from the city centre. After the war, it was only partially restored (one strip). A three-lane bridge was built in its place, reconstructed in 2014;
- The old railway bridge is a drawbridge, located in the area of the Museum of the World Ocean. Divorced by raising the middle span. The middle span is dismantled and the bridge is not used in any way. An abandoned railway line crosses the bridge;
- The Second Overpass Bridge was commissioned in December 2011. The bridge crosses both channels of the Pregolya and passes over Oktyabrsky Island, connecting April 9 Street in the right-bank part of the city with Dzerzhinsky Street in the left-bank part. The total length is 1,883 metres (2,059 yards). The bridge has three lanes in each direction. The design speed of vehicles is not less than 80 km/h (50 mph).

Seven bridges existed in Königsberg in the 16th-20th centuries. The relative position of the bridges led to the mathematical problem of Seven Bridges of Königsberg, and prompted the mathematician Leonhard Euler to speculate, which led to the emergence of graph theory.

== Education ==
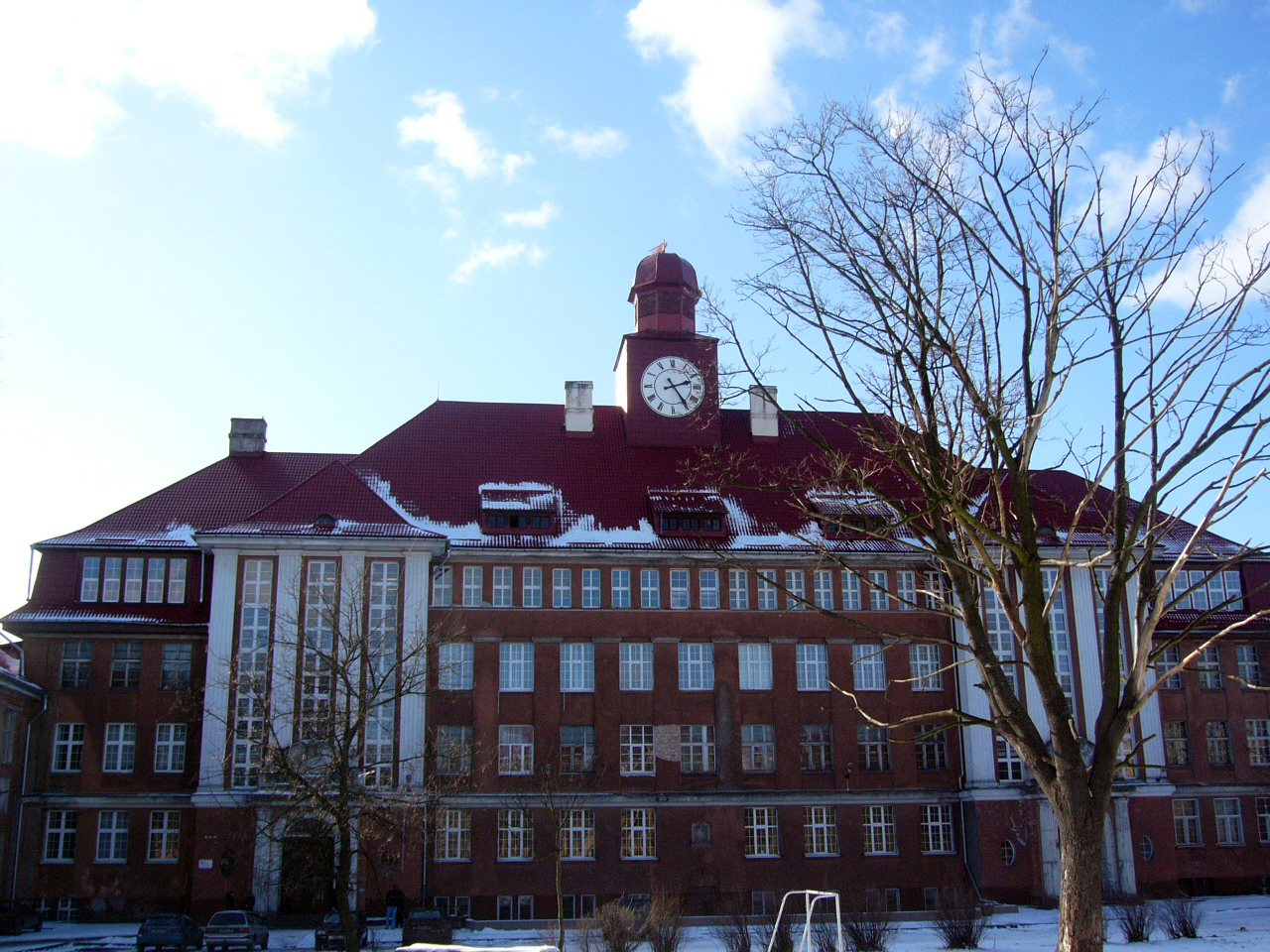
Immanuel Kant Baltic Federal University

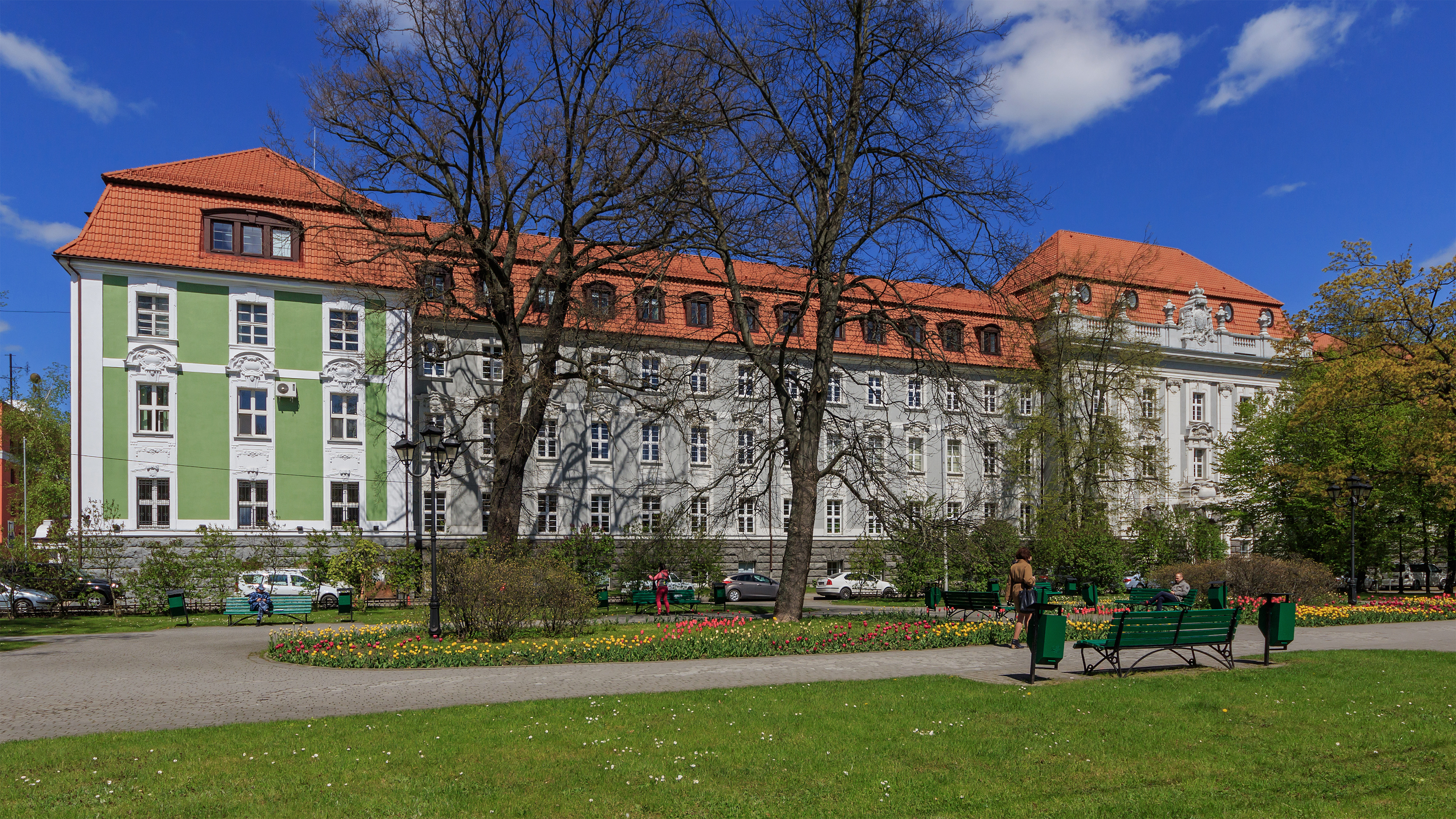
Kaliningrad State Technical University

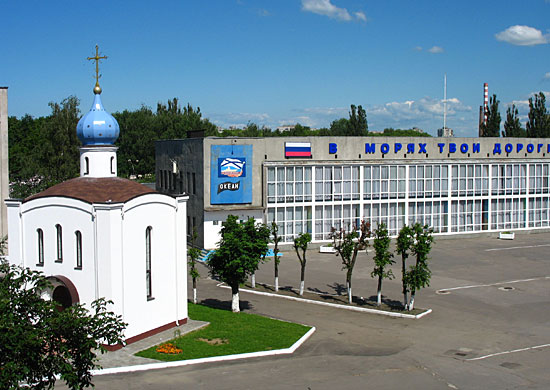
Baltic Naval Institute

Today, there are 21 higher educational institutions in Kaliningrad (together with branches of universities in other cities), of which the state-owned are:

- The Kaliningrad branch of the St. Petersburg University of the Ministry of Internal Affairs of Russia, previously the Kaliningrad Law Institute of the Ministry of Internal Affairs of Russia (KYUI), even earlier – the Kaliningrad Higher School of the Ministry of Internal Affairs of the Russian Federation, which was formed on the basis of the Kaliningrad Special Secondary School of Police of the Ministry of Internal Affairs of the USSR;
- Immanuel Kant Baltic Federal University. Until 2011 – Russian State University. I. Kant. The name of Kant was given on the eve of the city's 750th anniversary in 2005. Previously – Kaliningrad State University (KSU). Occupies the building of the former German University of Königsberg;
- Baltic State Academy of Fishing Fleet (BFFSA). Until 1991 – Kaliningrad Higher Marine Engineering School (KVIMU);
- Kaliningrad State Technical University (KSTU). Previously – Kaliningrad Technical Institute of the Fishing Industry and Economy (KTIRPiH);
- Kaliningrad Border Institute of the Federal Security Service of the Russian Federation. Previously – Kaliningrad Higher Engineering School of Engineering Troops named after A.A.Zhdanov (KVIUIV);
- The FF Ushakov Baltic Naval Institute, now a branch of the military educational and scientific centre of the Russian Navy "Naval Academy named after Admiral of the Fleet of the Soviet Union N. G. Kuznetsov." Previously – Kaliningrad Higher Naval School (KVVMU).

Also in Kaliningrad, there is a branch of the North-West Academy of Public Administration and National Economy, from secondary educational institutions – three gymnasiums, six lyceums and forty-seven secondary schools. There are educational institutions of secondary vocational education: Kaliningrad Regional College of Music. S. V. Rachmaninova, Kaliningrad State College of Urban Development, Kaliningrad Marine Fisheries College and others; to the IKBFU I. Kant included the Kaliningrad Technical College, the Communal Construction College. In addition, there is one cadet corps – KSH "Andrew the First-Called Cadet Naval Corps" (APKMK).

In August 2019, construction began on a branch of the Nakhimov Naval School. The opening is scheduled for 1 September 2020, the number of students will be over 560 people.

== Media ==
=== Television ===
The Kaliningrad television studio has existed since 1958 with its own frequency channel and daily 6–7-hour broadcasting, then it was called the Yantar TV and Radio Company. It has lost its channel and most of its airtime; it is a branch of the All-Russia State Television and Radio Broadcasting Company.

==== Kaliningrad television networks ====
- Channel One
- Russia 24
- 5TV
- Russia 1
- Zvezda
- TNT
- Russia-K
- Yu
- STS
- NTV
- TV Centre
- Match TV
- Public Television of Russia
- Carousel
- Mir
- REN TV
- Domashny
- TV-3
- Friday!
- Muz-TV
- Spas

=== Radio ===
==== Kaliningrad radio stations ====
- "Europa Plus"
- "Radio Chanson"
- "Radio 7 On Seven Hills"
- "Humour FM"
- "Vesti FM"
- "RMF FM" (Poland)
- "Retro FM"
- "Russkoye Radio"
- "Silver Rain Radio"
- "NRJ Russia"
- "Radio Zvezda"
- "AvtoRadio"
- "Radio Edge"
- "Radio Monte Carlo"
- "Nashe Radio"
- "Business FM"
- "Radio Mayak"
- "Studio 21"
- "Radio Rossii"
- "Road Radio"
- "Radio Maximum"
- "Radio Komsomolskaya Pravda"

=== Newspapers ===
The Polish- and German-language newspapers Głos znad Pregoły and Königsberger Express are published monthly in Kaliningrad.

== Notable people ==
- Viktor Patsayev (1933–1971), a Soviet cosmonaut
- Alexei Leonov (1934–2019), first person to walk in space
- Tamara Degtyaryova (1944–2018), stage, TV and film actress.
- Yury Romanenko (born 1944), a Soviet cosmonaut
- Alexander Viktorenko (1947-2023), a Soviet and Russian cosmonaut.
- Oleg Gazmanov (born 1951), singer
- Sergei Skripal (born 1951), intelligence officer and double agent
- Svetlana Orlova (born 1956), film actress.
- Aleksandra Yakovleva (1957–2022), actress and later, a rail transport executive.
- Sergey Medvedev (born 1958), journalist and TV presenter
- Lyudmila Putina (born 1958), linguist, ex-wife of Vladimir Putin, ex-First Lady of Russia
- Marina Orgeyeva (born 1959), politician.
- Andrey Kolesnik (born 1960), a sanctioned political figure
- Yury Savenko (1961–2020), politician, mayor of Kaliningrad from 1998 to 2007
- Alexander Yaroshuk (born 1965), politician, mayor of Kaliningrad from 2012 to 2018
- Lada Dance (born 1966), jazz and dance music singer.
- Andrey Merzlikin (born 1973), film and theatre actor.
- Vladimir Slivyak (born 1973), an environmental activist.
- Maksim Zuyev (1975-2010), journalist and activist
- Evgeny Vinokurov (born 1975), economist
- Irina Zahharenkova (born 1976), concert pianist and harpsichordist
- Andrey Klychkov (born 1979), state and political figure and a lawyer.
- Costa Ronin (born 1979), actor
- Oleg Kashin (born 1980), journalist, columnist and writer
- Alexander Shenderyuk-Zhidkov (born 1982), a sanctioned politician
- Tatyana Arntgolts & Olga Arntgolts (born 1982) (twins), theatre and film actresses
- Tanja Mihhailova-Saar (born 1983), pop singer and actress
- Egor Anisimov (born 1987), politician, a deputy of the Legislative Assembly of Kaliningrad Oblast.
- Nikolay Noritsyn (born 1991), Canadian chess player
- Tvangeste, (formed in 1996), symphonic black metal band

=== Sport ===
- Tamara Lazakovich (1954–1992), artistic gymnast, team gold medallist at the 1972 Summer Olympics
- Aleksandr Perov (born 1955), cyclist, team silver medallist at the 1976 Summer Olympics
- Anatoly Beloglazov (born 1956), wrestler, gold medallist at the 1980 Summer Olympics
- Sergei Beloglazov (born 1956), wrestler, gold medallist at the 1980 & 1988 Summer Olympics
- Irina Nazarova (born 1957), 400 metres athlete, team gold medallist at the 1980 Summer Olympics.
- Mikhail Chesnokov (born 1961), footballer, played over 320 games, starting with FC Baltika Kaliningrad
- Aleksandr Gvardis (born 1965), former football referee.
- Vyacheslav Nikiforov (1966–2024), footballer who played about 370 games, including about 320 for FC Baltika Kaliningrad
- Alexander Volkov (1967–2019), tennis player
- Andrei Voronkov (born 1967), volleyball player and coach
- Andrey Shumilin (1970–2022), wrestler
- Oleg Yelyshev (born 1971), footballer who played about 430 games, beginnining with FC Baltika Kaliningrad
- Mihails Miholaps (born 1974), football coach and former player, played 349 games and 32 for Latvia
- Andrejus Zadneprovskis (born 1974), modern pentathlete, silver medallist at the 2004 Summer Olympics
- Aleksey Basov (born 1977), former racing driver.
- Oksana Grishina (born 1978), former gymnast and fitness competitor
- Anton Khazov (born 1979), football coach and former player, played about 390 games
- Aleksei Rogachyov (born 1979), football goalkeeper, played 329 games and about 200 games for FC Baltika Kaliningrad
- Dmitri Turutin (born 1981), footballer, played about 290 games, beginnining with FC Baltika Kaliningrad
- Dmitry Lapikov (born 1982), disqualified Olympic weightlifter
- Yevgeni Tsimbal (born 1986), footballer, who played about 470 games including about 140 for FC Baltika Kaliningrad
- Kirill Marushchak (born 1986), footballer who played about 350 games including 26 for FC Baltika Kaliningrad
- Dmitry Stotsky (born 1989), footballer who played abvout 350 games, beginning with 123 with FC Baltika Kaliningrad
- Vladislav Kryuchkov (born 1989), footballer, played about 240 games including 145 for FC Baltika Kaliningrad
- Anastasia Nazarenko (born 1993), rhythmic gymnast, team gold medallist at the 2012 Summer Olympics
- Vitali Kalenkovich (born 1993), football player, played about 250 games, including 198 with FC Baltika Kaliningrad
- Aleksandra Ruchkina (born 1997), paralympic athlete, silver medallist at the 2020 Summer Paralympics
- Oleg Isayenko (born 2000), footballer who has played about 200 games

== International relations ==
=== Diplomatic missions ===
In 2004, Germany opened a consulate general in Kaliningrad. This consulate allows Kaliningrad residents to get Schengen visas without having to travel to Moscow. An agreement between Gerhard Schröder, Chancellor of Germany, and President of Russia Vladimir Putin established the consulate in light of Lithuania and Poland, which surround Kaliningrad, joining the EU. Russian concerns with Germany wanting the former Königsberg back had stifled earlier plans for a German consulate.

=== Small border traffic law ===
Poland and the Russian Federation have an agreement whereby residents of Kaliningrad and the Polish cities of Olsztyn, Elbląg and Gdańsk may obtain "small border traffic" cards permitting repeated travel between the two countries, crossing the Polish–Russian border. As of July 2013, Poland had issued 100,000 of the cards.

=== Twin towns – sister cities ===
Kaliningrad is twinned with:

- Baranavichy, Belarus
- Brest, Belarus
- Cagliari, Italy
- Catania, Italy
- Forlì, Italy
- Gomel, Belarus
- Yerevan, Armenia (2009)

=== Former twin towns ===
- Białystok, Poland
- Elbląg, Poland
- Gdańsk, Poland
- Gdynia, Poland
- Łódź, Poland
- Olsztyn, Poland
- Norfolk, United States (suspended)
- Panevėžys, Lithuania
- Klaipėda, Lithuania
- Šiauliai, Lithuania
- Racibórz, Poland
- Toruń, Poland
- Kaunas, Lithuania
- Kętrzyn County, Poland
- Bremerhaven, Germany (resting)
- Zeitz, Germany (resting)
- Kiel, Germany (resting)
- Berlin-Lichtenberg, Germany (resting)
- Mühlhausen, Germany (associated, resting)
- Rostock, Germany (associated, discontinued)
- Kalmar, Sweden (paused)
- Malmö, Sweden

In February and March 2022 many cities terminated their cooperation with Kaliningrad as a response to the Russian invasion of Ukraine.

== See also ==
- Heart of the City (Kaliningrad)
- Kaliningrad question
- Radio Königsberg
- Suwałki Gap
