= Vorstadt Oberrealschule =

Vorstadt Oberrealschule (German: Vorstädtische Oberrealschule) was an Oberrealschule in the Vorstadt quarter of Königsberg, Germany.

== History ==
Vorstadt's school was the only secondary school in the city south of the Pregel. Its origin is unclear. Fritz Gause describes its predecessor as a Mittelschule in Oberhaberberg which moved to Hintere Vorstadt in 1900. In its entry on the Vorstädtische Realschule, the Statistisches Jahrbuch der höheren Schulen states it developed from an elementary school founded in 1815 and known as the Domschule (referencing Königsberg Cathedral) since 25 July 1835. On 15 October 1874 this school was acquired by the city of Königsberg and renamed the Kneiphöfische Mittelschule. It became a Realschule on 15 March 1902. Johann Kollberg was the school's director in the early 20th century.

The new red brick building in Vorstadt, located where the St.-Georg-Hospital stood on Böhmstraße near Jahrmarktplatz and St.-Georg-Hospital, contained a large gym and auditorium. Erhard Roß, director from 1924 to 1928, headed the school during its transition into an Oberrealschule from 1925 to 1928. It was led by Karl Ludwig from 1928 to 1933.

Most students came from Vorstadt, Haberberg, Nasser Garten, Ponarth, and Rosenau. A number of students also commuted to the school, as it was located near the city's Hauptbahnhof (now Kaliningrad Passazhirsky railway station). The Oberrealschule was destroyed during the 1944 bombing of Königsberg in World War II.
