= Contienen =

Quarter of Königsberg, Germany

Coordinates: 54°41′36″N 20°26′39″E

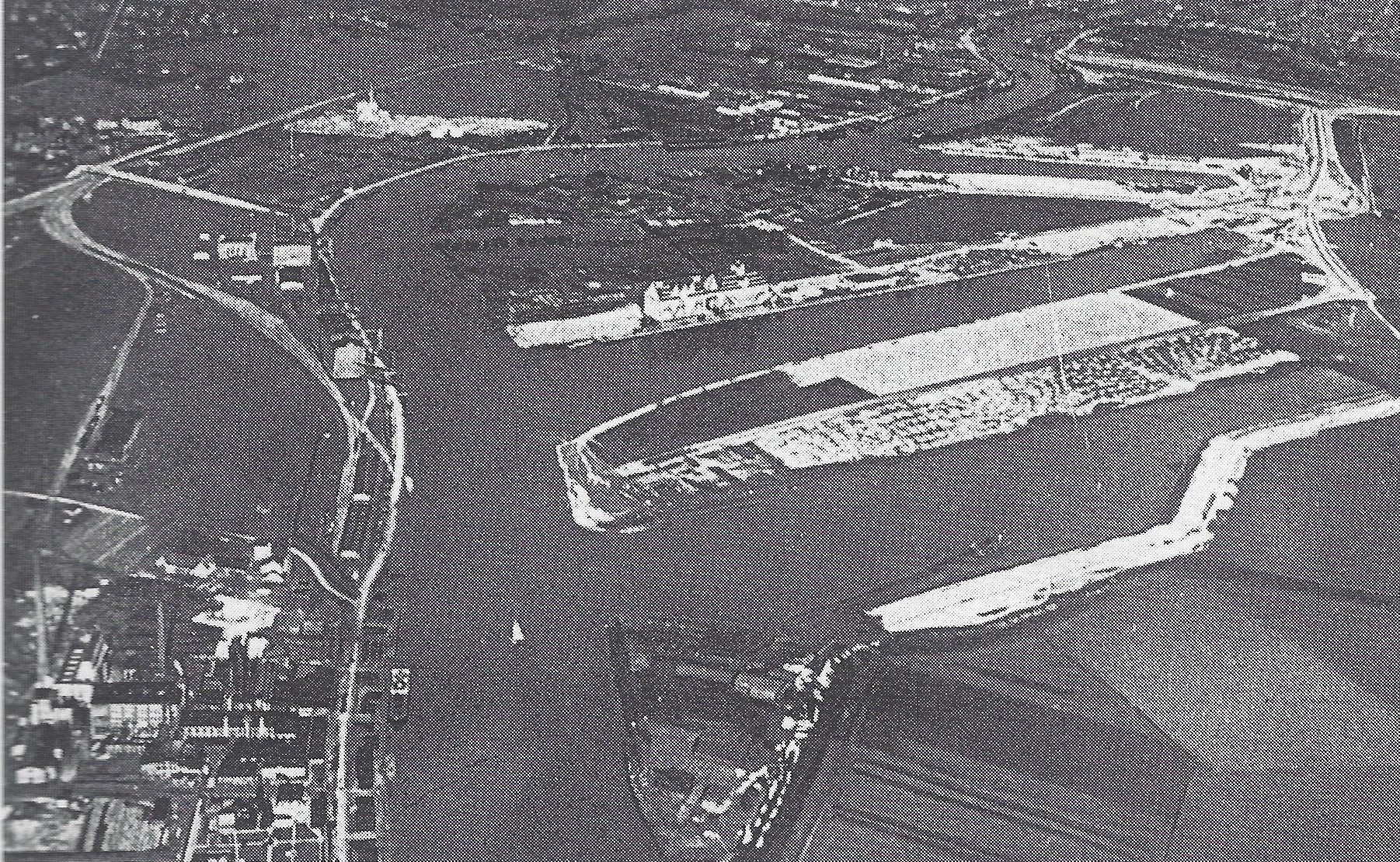
Docks near Contienen

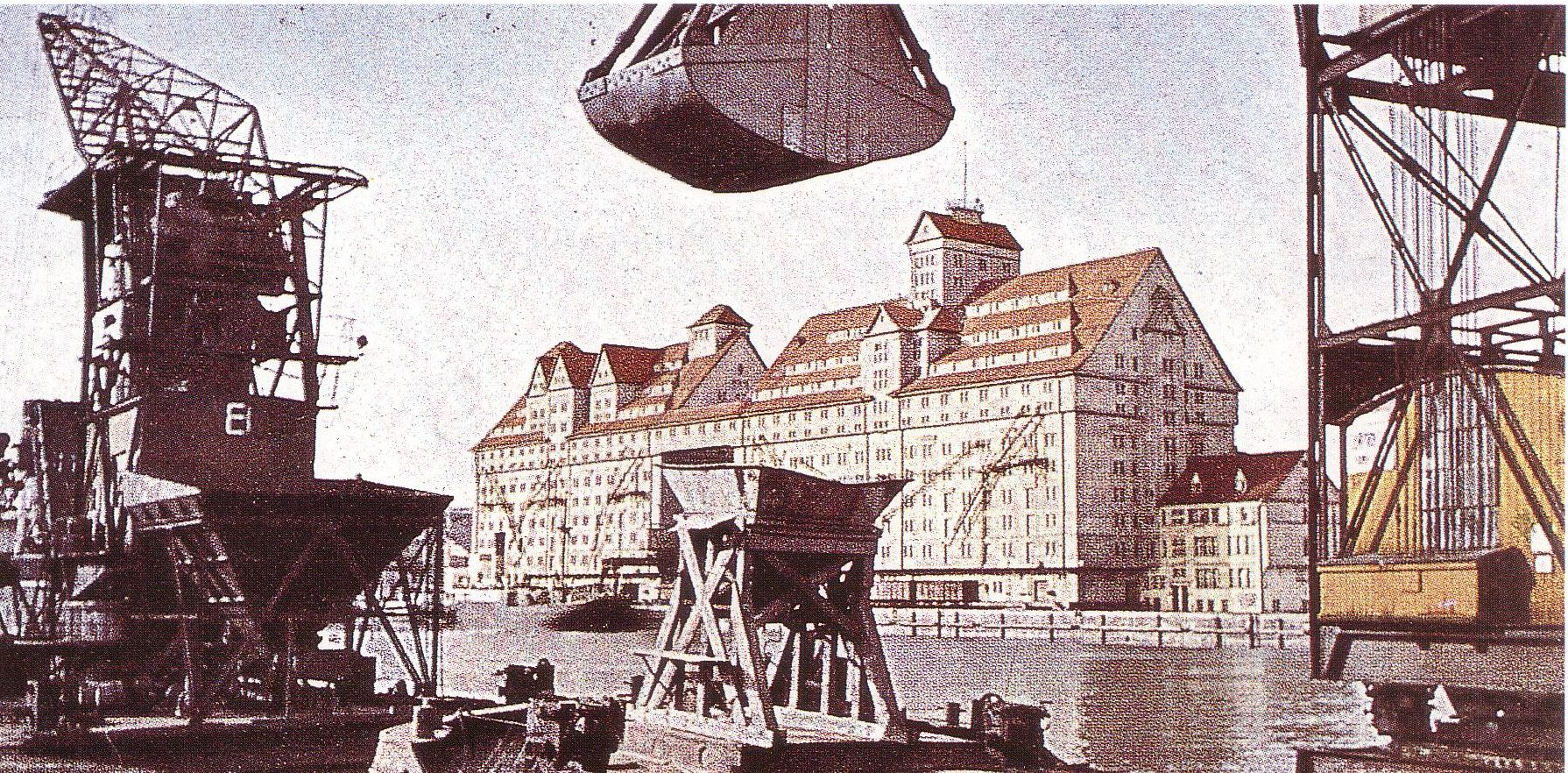
Warehouses along the docks

Contienen or Kontienen was a quarter of western Königsberg, Germany. Its territory is now part of the Moskovsky District of Kaliningrad, Russia.

== History ==
Contienen was originally an outwork (Vorwerk) estate on the southern shore of the lower Pregel. Nasser Garten was to the east and Ponarth was to the southeast. In 1684 Wybrand von Workum was tasked by Frederick William I, Elector of Brandenburg, to construct ships at a newly built shipyard in Contienen. Workum was opposed by the citizens of Königsberg, however, and by 1687 only four galiots had been built.

Union Giesserei Königsberg was based in Continien since 1907; in 1912 they acquired Gustav Bendikt Fechter's Contienen shipyard. Segelclub RHE moved from Friedrichsburg to Contienen in 1914.

By 1924 three large docks (Hafenbecken) were built northeast of Contienen and northwest of Nasser Garten to alleviate Königsberg's economic difficulties after the Treaty of Versailles and the separation of East Prussia from Weimar Germany. The Holzhafen (wood harbor) was closest to Contienen, followed by the Industriehafen (industrial harbor) across from Ratshof and the Freihafen (free harbor) across from Kosse. The docks were often used by Seedienst Ostpreußen. Contienen was incorporated into Königsberg in 1927.
