= Chapayevo Microdistrict =

Residential area in Kaliningrad, Russia

Coordinates: 54°40′15″N 20°27′30″E

Chapayevo (Russian: Чапаево) is a residential area in Moskovsky District of Kaliningrad, Russia. It was formerly known by its German language name Prappeln as first a suburb of and then a quarter of southwestern Königsberg, Germany.

== History ==
Prappeln was neighbored by Spandienen to the northwest, Schönbusch to the north, Ponarth to the northeast, and Kalgen to the west. It was documented in 1425 as Perrappelen, in 1467 as Pirrappelen, and in 1488 as Prappeln. Its name was derived from prapolis, the Old Prussian word for the hoopoe bird.

The village was incorporated into the city of Königsberg in April 1939. Königsberg became Russian Kaliningrad following World War II; Prappeln was renamed Chapayevo after the soldier Vasily Chapayev.
