= Suvorovo Microdistrict =

Microdistrict in Kaliningrad, Russia

Suvorovo (Russian: Суворово) is a residential area in Moskovsky District of Kaliningrad, Russia. It was formerly known by its German language name Spandienen as first a suburban estate and then a quarter of Königsberg, Germany, located southwest of the city center.

== History ==
Spandienen was documented in 1419 as Spandyno; the name was of Old Prussian origin. Spandienen was situated along the Berliner Chaussee, northeast of Kalgen, northwest of Prappeln and southwest of Schönbusch and Ponarth.

The estate of Spandienen was in the possession of Johann Schnürlein, mayor of Kneiphof and ducal chamberlain, in 1579. Spandienen, which developed into a residential quarter in the first half of the 20th century, was incorporated into the city of Königsberg in 1928.

Königsberg was transferred to Soviet control in 1945 after World War II. Königsberg was subsequently renamed to Kaliningrad and Spandienen to Suvorovo.
