= Vorstadt (Königsberg) =

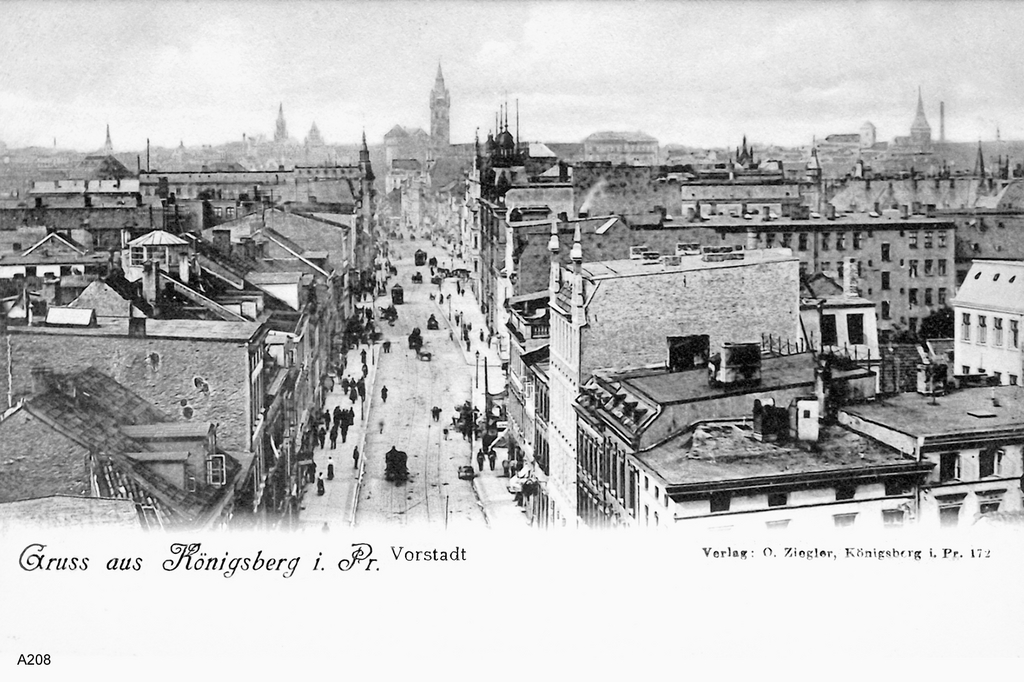
View of Vorstadt from the south

Vorstadt ("suburb" in German) was a quarter of southern Königsberg, Germany. Its territory is now part of the Moskovsky District of Kaliningrad, Russia.

== History ==
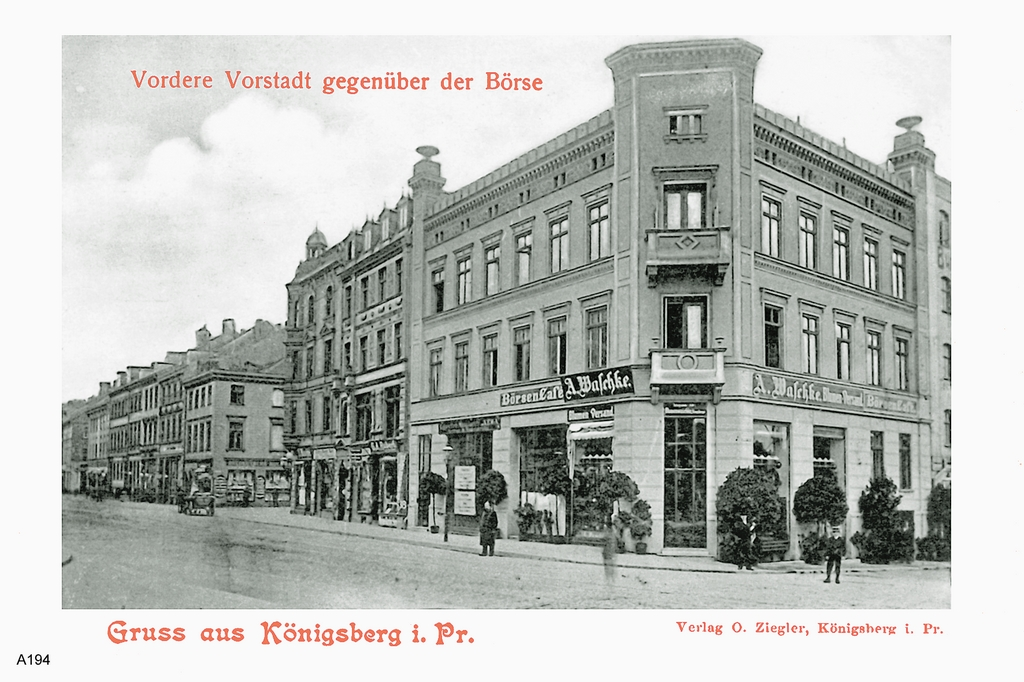
Postcard of Vordere Vorstadt across from the Stock Exchange

In 1329 the Teutonic Knights granted land on the southern shore of the Pregel River to the island town of Kneiphof primarily for constructing docks, but also for gardens, agriculture, and pastureland. The suburb which developed there, the Kneiphöfische Vorstadt, became a Freiheit district with special rights under the control of Kneiphof. Its Gerichtssiegel, or court seal, depicted a hand descending from clouds holding a weighing scale, flanked by the two hunting horns of Kneiphof. Much of Königsberg's Russian population was settled in Vorstadt.

By the Rathäusliche Reglement of 13 June 1724, King Frederick William I of Prussia merged Kneiphof and Vorstadt into the united city of Königsberg.

== Locations ==
Vorstadt was divided into Vordere Vorstadt bordering the Pregel to the north and Hintere Vorstadt to the south bordering Haberberg. Vordere Vorstadt was originally documented as St. Antonsvorstadt, after St. Antonshospital, in 1376. It was defended by a wall, palisades, and ditches in the year 1520 when it was threatened by Polish troops in the Horsemen's War. In 1648 it was known as Innere Vorstadt and by 1677 as Vordere Vorstadt. It often suffered from fires; a conflagration in 1811 destroyed the house where Immanuel Kant was born.

Hintere Vorstadt was developed after Vordere Vorstadt and was originally known as St. Georgsvorstadt, after St. Georgshospital. Hintere Vorstadt and St. Georgshospital were burnt during the Horsemen's War. The southern half was also known as Äussere Vorstadt. The common name of Hintere Vorstadt was documented in 1726.

The avenue Vorstädtische Langgasse ran from Haberberg Church north through Vorstadt before becoming the Kneiphöfische Langgasse in Kneiphof. It became one of Königsberg's busiest thoroughfares with the opening of the nearby Hauptbahnhof in 1929. The quarter also contained the Vorstadt Oberrealschule.

In 1753 King Frederick II of Prussia allowed the city's Jews to build a Hasidic synagogue on Vordere Vorstadt's Schnürlingsdamm, which was completed in 1756. Although the Alte Synagoge burned down in 1811, it was rebuilt on nearby Synagogenstraße and dedicated in 1815. In 1893 the Adass Jisroel, an Orthodox branch, opened their own synagoge on Synagogenstraße near the Alte Synagoge. The Liberal Neue Synagoge was opened in Lomse in the 1890s. Königsberg's synagogues were burned down during Kristallnacht in 1938.

Königsberg's stock exchange, the Börse, was located by the Pregel between the bridges Grüne Brücke and Köttelbrücke. Fort Friedrichsburg existed just west of Vordere Vorstadt from 1657 to 1910.

== Gallery ==
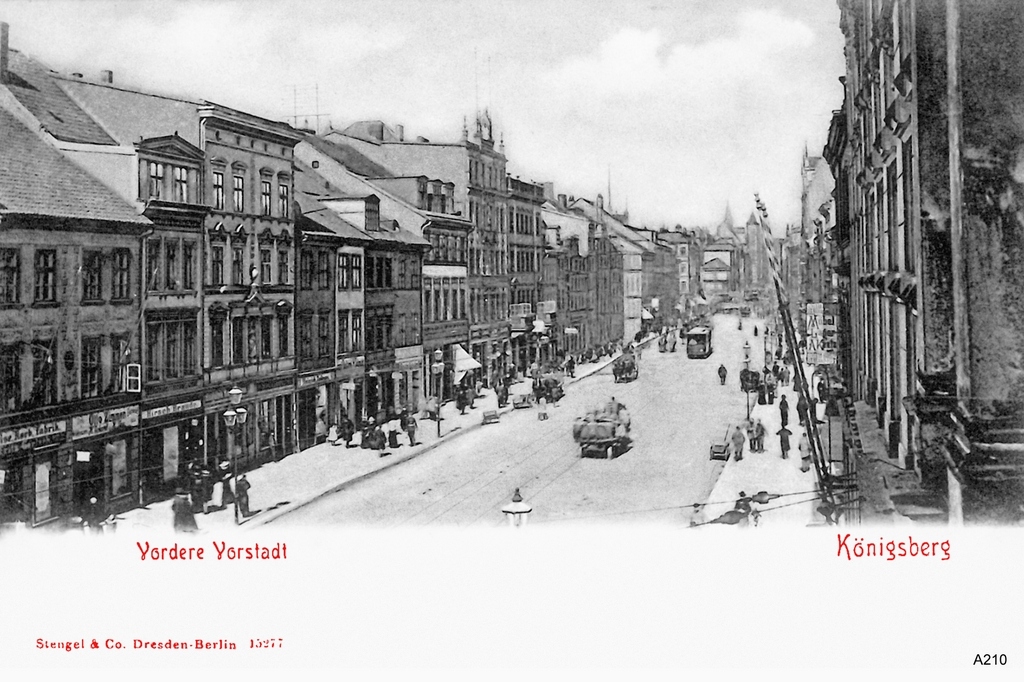
Vordere Vorstadt

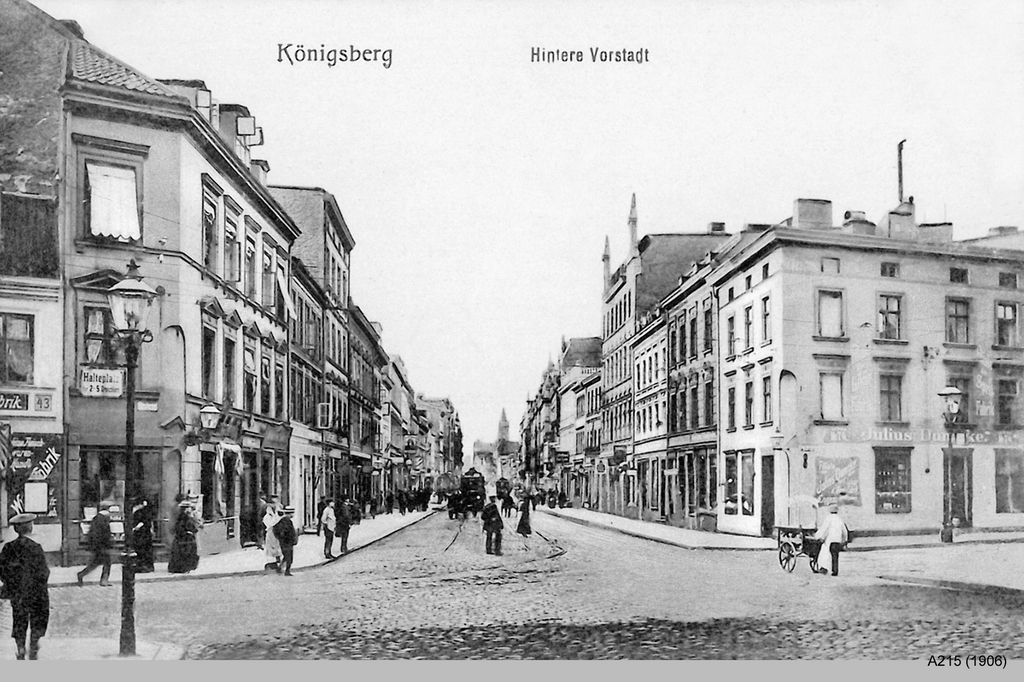
Hintere Vorstadt

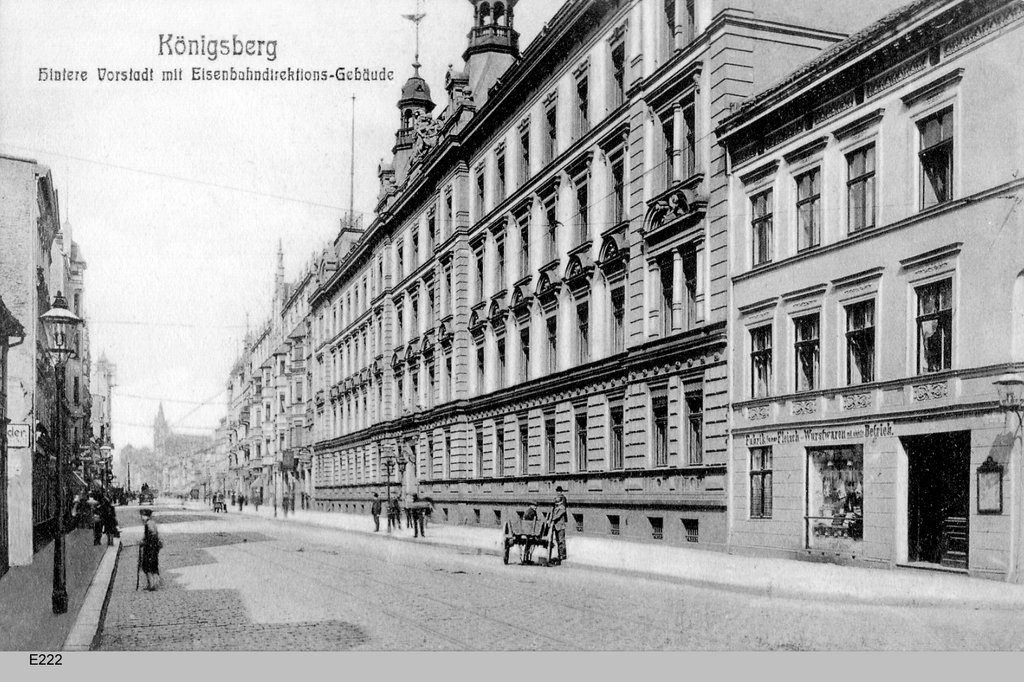
Hintere Vorstadt with a railway building
