= Baltiysky Administrative District =

District of Kaliningrad, Russia

Baltiysky Administrative District (Russian: Балтийский район) was a district (raion) of the city of Kaliningrad, Kaliningrad Oblast, Russia.

The Baltiysky Administrative District was formed on 25 July 1947. In accordance with the decision of the District Council of Deputies of the city of Kaliningrad dated 29 June 2009 No. 141, a reorganization was carried out: the Baltiysky Administrative District were merged into the Moskovsky Administrative District.
