= St. Joseph's Church, Königsberg =

Church building in Kaliningrad, Russia

Coordinates: 54°40′44″N 20°28′47″E

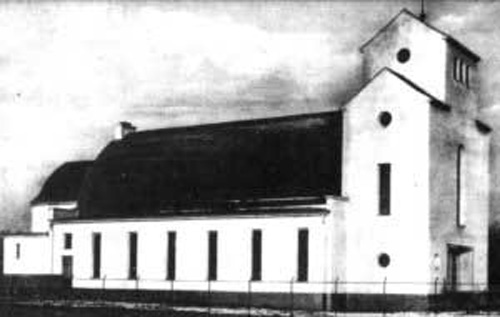
St. Joseph's Church in Ponarth, Königsberg

St. Joseph's Church (German: Josephkirche or Josephskapelle) was a Roman Catholic church in the Ponarth quarter of Königsberg, Germany dedicated to Saint Joseph.

By 1930, the working-class quarter Ponarth south of center city Königsberg included the Protestant Ponarth Church but lacked a Catholic parish. The new St. Joseph's Church was built along Brandenburger Straße in 1931 and dedicated in 1932.

The church survived the 1944 Bombing of Königsberg and the 1945 Battle of Königsberg; the city became part of the Soviet Union after World War II and renamed as Kaliningrad. The building is now used for residential housing.
