= Haberberg =

Coordinates: 54°41′46″N 20°30′09″E

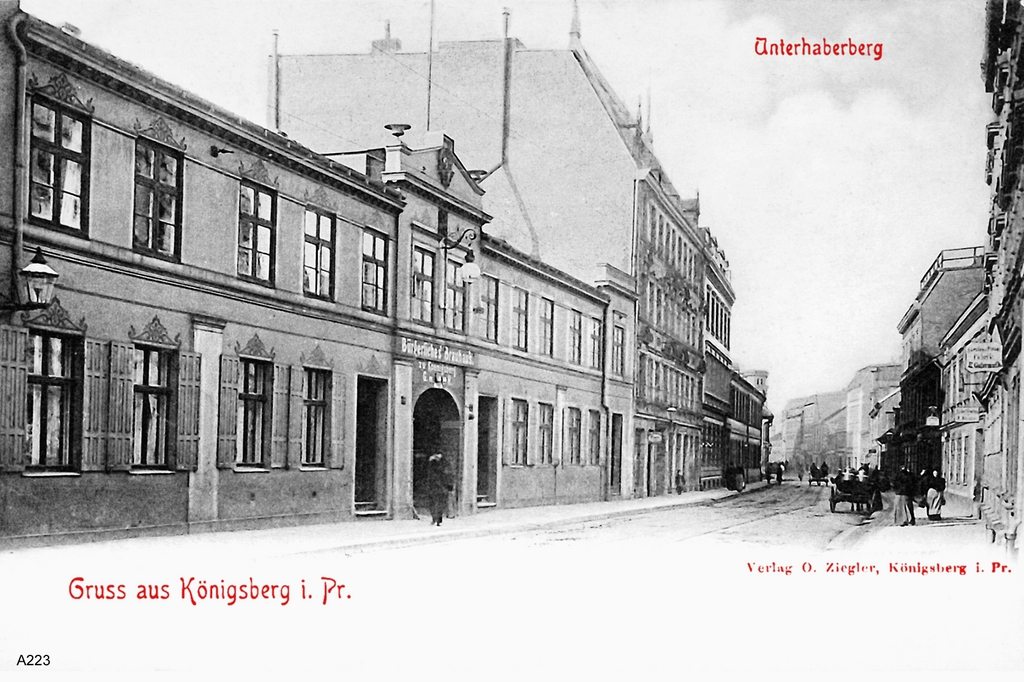
Unterhaberberg

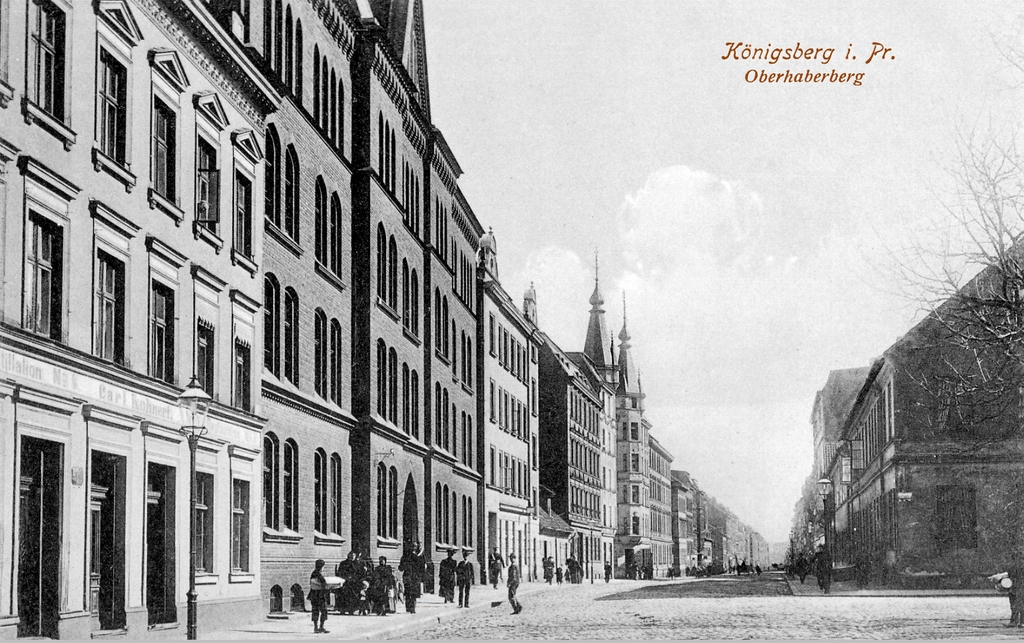
Oberhaberberg

Haberberg was a mostly residential quarter of southern Königsberg, now part of the Moskovsky District of Kaliningrad, Russia.

== History ==
The hill Haberberg located south of Hintere Vorstadt in Natangia was first documented in the charter of Kneiphof in 1327. It was one of the safest spots in the region when the Pregel River would flood. Gerke Hoppener, a lokator employed by the Teutonic Knights, founded the village of Haberberg with 19 morgen and Kulm law in 1378. It was captured by Polish forces during the Polish–Teutonic War of 1519–1521. Grand Master Albert of Brandenburg-Ansbach granted the village to the town of Kneiphof in 1522. Haberberg was divided into Unterhaberberg (Lower Haberberg) to the north and Oberhaberberg (Upper Haberberg) to the south. The village administered Alter Garten to its west, but Nasser Garten was a separate quarter; the two garden territories were divided by the Brandenburg Gate. The Viehmarkt in eastern Haberberg was a market for cattle and horses from Natangia, Bartia, and southern Lithuania. Just north of the Viehmarkt was the Hohe Brücke, a bridge connecting to the island quarter of Lomse.

By the Rathäusliche Reglement of 13 June 1724, King Frederick William I of Prussia merged Kneiphof and Haberberg into the united city of Königsberg. All houses in Haberberg and Alter Garten burned down in a fire on 10 May 1775 and had to be rebuilt.

Working class Haberberg was one of the most densely settled districts Königsberg and had one of the highest birth rates in the city at the start of the 20th century. Haberberg was heavily damaged by the 1944 Bombing of Königsberg and 1945 Battle of Königsberg.

== Locations ==
Construction of the Protestant Haberberg Church began in Oberhaberberg in 1537; it was later decorated with a splendid Rococo interior. The Church of the Holy Family was built in Haberberg for Roman Catholic immigrants from 1904 to 1907. Other churches included the Viehmarkt's Lutherkirche and the Baptistenkirche.

Königsberg's central train station was located in southwestern Haberberg. South of Oberhaberberg in the Haberberger Grunde were artillery barracks. Other military buildings in the quarter were the Offiziers-Kasino, the Train-Kaserne, and the Artillerie-Ökonomie-Gebäude.
