= Chaikovskoye =

Coordinates: 54.6708°N 20.4361°E

Chaikovskoye (Russian: Чайковское) is part of the Moskovsky District of Kaliningrad, Russia. It was formerly known by its German language name Kalgen as first a suburb of and then a quarter of Königsberg, Germany.

== History ==
In the January 1262 Battle of Kalgen during the Great Prussian Uprising, a Sambian army ambushed the crusading forces of William IV, Count of Jülich, and Engelbert I, Count of the Mark, near Kalgen. The German crusaders were able to defeat the Sambians with the assistance of Königsberg Castle's garrison of Teutonic Knights. After William and Engelbert returned home, however, the Sambians resumed the Siege of Königsberg. The villages was documented as Sclunien in 1326, Calyen in 1419, Kalgyn in 1491, and Gallien in 1522. Its name was of Old Prussian origin.

On 9 April 1522 Grand Master Albert granted Kalgen to Paul Militisch of Kneiphof, who had served as secretary to the grand master since 1514. The estate of Kalgen later belonged to the Sacksen family.

The chaussee from Königsberg to Kalgen began in 1816 and became part of the road toward Berlin.

The fort VIII König Friedrich Wilhelm IV, named in 1894, was built near Kalgen as part of the new Königsberg fortifications constructed from 1872-94. Kalgen was incorporated into the city of Königsberg in April 1939. Neighboring quarters were Haffstrom to the west, Prappeln to the east, and Spandienen to the northeast. Königsberg was transferred from Germany to the Soviet Union in 1945 and subsequently renamed Kaliningrad.
