= Schönbusch =

Schönbusch or Schoenbusch refers to:

- Schönbusch (Königsberg)
- Schloss and Park Schönbusch (Aschaffenburg)
- Stadion am Schönbusch, venue for Viktoria Aschaffenburg
