= Lomse =

Coordinates: 54°42′16″N 20°31′15″E

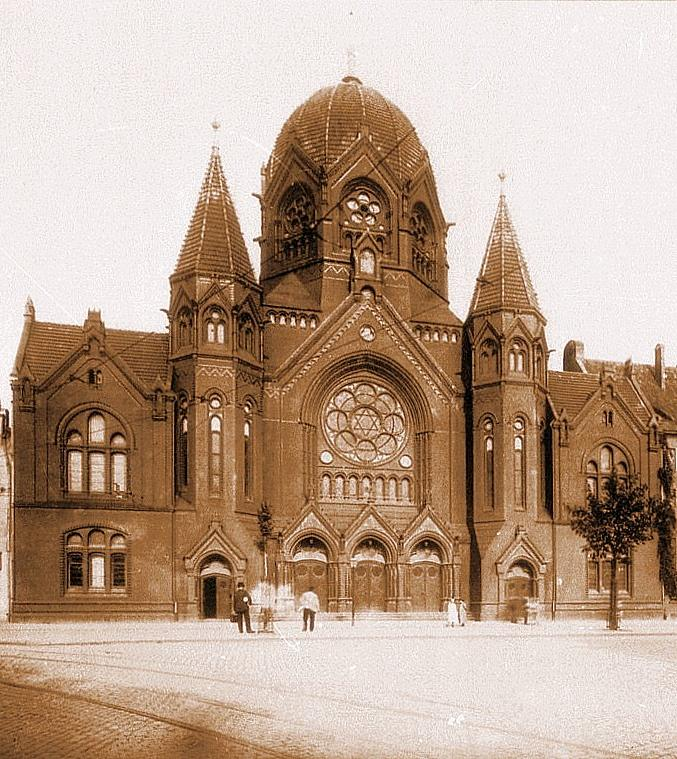
Neue Synagoge

Lomse was a quarter of eastern Königsberg in Germany (now Kaliningrad, Russia). Lomse was located on the western end of Lomse Island in the Pregel River; the large island is now known as October Island (Russian: Октябрьский остров). The Neuer Pregel, the northern branch of the river, separated Lomse from Kneiphof to the west, Altstadt to the northwest, and Löbenicht to the north. Lomse's territory is now part of Kaliningrad's Moskovsky District and Lomse is now known as Oktyabrsky Island, in honor of the October Revolution.

== History ==
Lomse's name was of Old Prussian origin and referred to marshland. Only the western end of the island was heavily developed, with the remainder consisting mostly of meadows. The land was granted to Altstadt in 1286 and was initially used as a lumberyard and then as a warehouse quarter. Kneiphof feared that Altstadt's control of Lomse would lead to a trade war; in 1434 Grand Master Paul von Rusdorf negotiated a compromise in which only sties and barns would be built at a prescribed distance from the river.

By the Rathäusliche Reglement of 13 June 1724, King Frederick William I of Prussia merged Altstadt and Lomse into the united city of Königsberg.

== Locations ==
Prominent roads in northern Lomse were the western Vorderlomse and eastern Hinterlomse. The latter was also known as Seilerbahn because of the rope produced there (see also Reeperbahn).

Lomse was connected to Altstadt and Löbenicht by the northern Holzbrücke (Wood Bridge), constructed by the burghers of Altstadt in 1404. This bridge connected with Lindenstraße, which was originally the Ochsenmarkt (oxen market) and then a grain market. In 1838 53 linden trees were planted there; locals called it the Lindenmarkt (linden market). Much of Königsberg's Polish population was settled along Lindenstraße and the neighboring shores of the Pregel.

Approval of the southern Hohe Brücke (High Bridge) to connect Lomse with Haberberg over the southern Alter Pregel was granted in 1377, but it was not until 1500-20 that the bridge, then known as the Newe Brücke, was actually built. Burghers from insular Kneiphof began to settle in Lomse after the completion of the Honigbrücke (Honey Bridge) connected the two islands in 1542.

King Frederick II financed a mulberry plantation (Plantage) in Lomse in 1742, but the plants froze during the harsh winter of 1771. The Protestant Kreuzkirche was built along the Plantage from 1930 to 1933.

The liberal Neue Synagoge (new synagogue), built along Lindenstraße from 1894 to 1896, was burned down during the Night of Broken Glass in 1938. The Kypkeanum on Hinterlomse was a dormitory established in 1778 by the philologist Georg David Kypke for students of the University of Königsberg.

To the south Lindenstraße became the Weidendamm, which was named after its decorative willow trees. Weidendamm was first developed by Altstadt during the 1455 siege of Kneiphof, part of the Thirteen Years' War, and was used as a warehouse quarter. It connected to Vorstadt by the Kaiserbrücke (Emperor Bridge) and to Haberberg by the Hohe Brücke (High Bridge). Working class Weidendamm had one of the highest birth rates in the city at the start of the 20th century.

Of the Seven Bridges of Königsberg made famous by the mathematical problem solved by Leonhard Euler, three connected to Lomse. Originally all were bascule bridges.

- Holzbrücke ("Wooden Bridge") north across the Neuer Pregel to Löbenicht. The first bridge was built in 1404.
- Honigbrücke ("Honey Bridge") west to Kneiphof, on its own island in the Pregolya (Pregel). Built in 1542 with the permission of Albert, Duke of Prussia. Its name comes from the honey with which Kneiphof burgher Bezenrade (Vesenrade) paid the builders.
- Hohebrücke ("High Bridge") south across the Alter Pregel to Haberberg. The old bridge existed by 1520.
