= Fort Friedrichsburg =

Fort in Germany

Coordinates: 54°42′16″N 20°29′38″E

Friedrichsburg is situated in the western Pregel in this map of Königsberg from 1905.

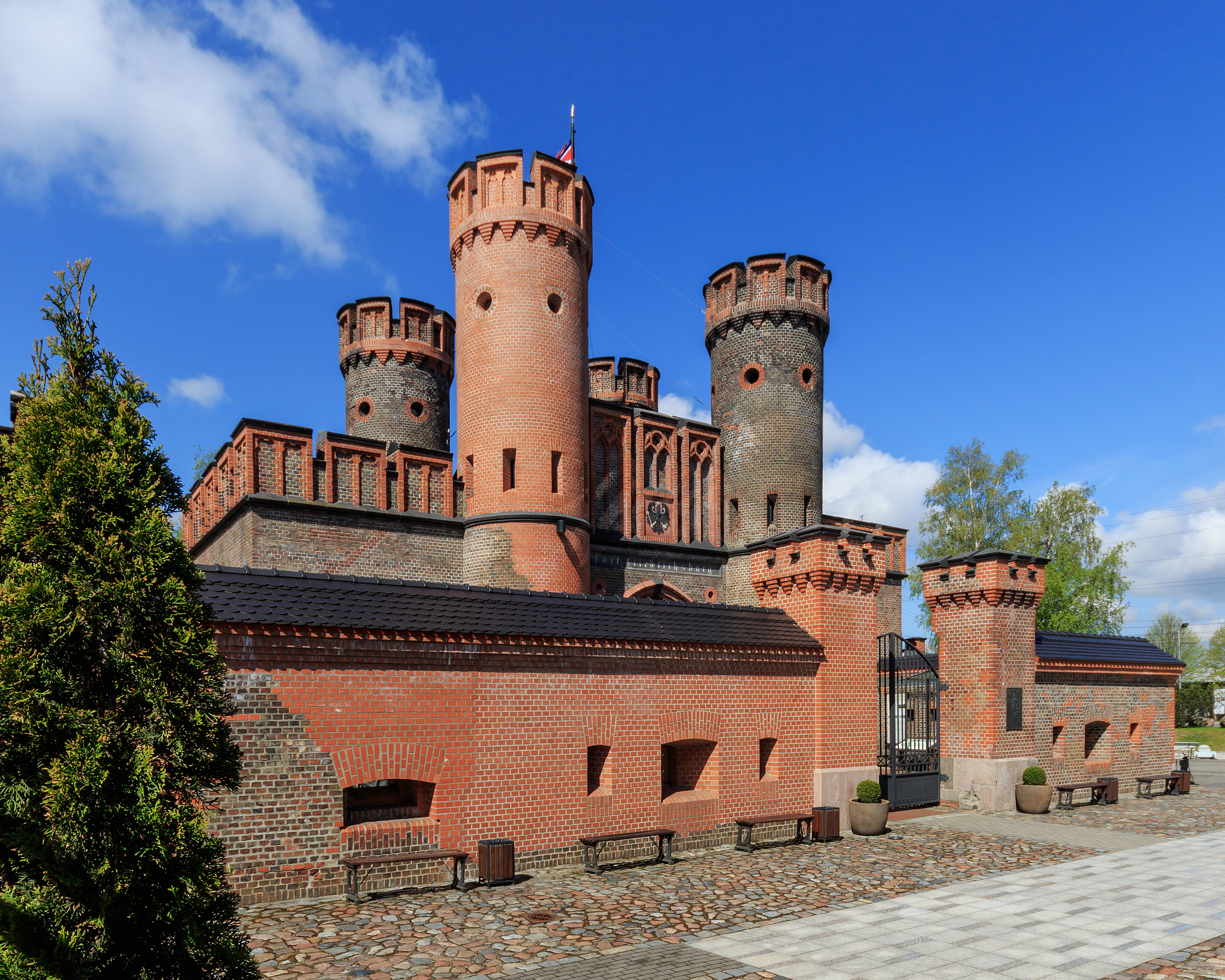
Fort Friedrichsburg in modern Kaliningrad

Fort Friedrichsburg or Feste Friedrichsburg was a fort in Königsberg, Germany. The only remnant of the former fort is the Friedrichsburg Gate (Russian: Фридрихсбургские ворота, German: Friedrichsburger Tor) in Kaliningrad, Russia.

== History ==
Plan of Friedrichsburg Fortress (c. 1780)

Construction of the fort began in 1657 during the Second Northern War by the order of Frederick William of Brandenburg-Prussia. The fort was built in place of a tollhouse on the southern shore of the Pregel River at the western edge of Königsberg. It was included within the new ring of Königsberg fortifications constructed from 1626 to 1634. Districts neighboring the fort were Vorstadt to the east, Nasser Garten to the southwest outside of the city walls, and Lastadie to the north across the river. Construction of the fort was resented by the constituent towns of Königsberg, especially Kneiphof.

Friedrichsburg was designed by Christian Otter, court mathematician and Albertina professor. Friedrichsburg's position allowed its cannons to defend the city from the west, monitor incoming traffic from the Frisches Haff, and suppress civil uprising. The fort originally consisted of earthwork, bricks, and ditches. The square-shaped structure included four bastions, nicknamed Smaragd, Perle, Rubin, and Diamant.

Initially only the northeastern bastion contained a cavalier and ravelin. Later additions included ravelins along the western and southern fronts, a cavalier along the southwestern bastion, and a covered way along the counterscarp . These additions were possibly completed during the occupation of Königsberg by the Imperial Russian Army in the Seven Years' War (1758–62). The additions were not visible on Valerianus Müller's plan from 1815.

The interior of the fort contained a command building, lodging, supplies, and prisons. It had a small permanent garrison of about 150 men, but could host a stronger force if need be. A small church, constructed in 1671, served as the garrison church until 1816. An armory was completed in 1796, but dismantled in 1892.

Peter I of Russia studied the fort in 1697 while touring Europe. The fort was used as a state and military prison until 1825; Ludwig Yorck von Wartenburg was imprisoned there for insubordination from 1780 to 1781. The Friedrichsburg Gate was completed during the reign of King Frederick William IV of Prussia. The fort was remodeled in 1852 during the reign of King Frederick William IV of Prussia, with construction of the stately Friedrichsburg Gate, new walls, and expansion of the citadel with four round towers. By the end of the 19th century, however, the fort was used only for military storage.

To allow construction of new tracks for Königsberg's goods station, Friedrichsburg was sold to the Prussian Eastern Railway on 23 August 1910 and subsequently dismantled. Segelclub RHE moved from Friedrichsburg to Contienen in 1914.

The site was used for storage and automobile exhibitions after the change of German Königsberg to Russian Kaliningrad resulting from World War II. It is being restored during the 2010s and is part of the Museum of the World's Oceans.
