= Segelclub Rhe =

Coordinates: 53°33′N 09°59′E

- Burgee
- Founded: 1855
- Location: Hamburg, Germany
- Website: http://www.sc-rhe.de/en/

Segelclub Rhe (Sailing Club Rhe) is the oldest yacht club in Germany. It was established in 1855 in Königsberg, East Prussia.

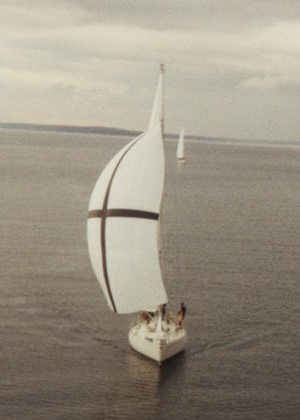
One of the club's yachts

== History ==
Segelclub RHE began when Ernst Burow, then a high school student, got a fishing boat as a present and needed a few friends to sail it. The club quickly became very successful and organized not only sailing events in the Baltic Sea and nearby lakes in the summer, but also ice sailing competitions in the winter. Segelclub RHE contributed to the foundation of the Deutscher Segler-Verband (German Sailing Association) in 1888.

The club moved from Friedrichsburg to Contienen in 1914. After World War II, following Soviet occupation and the expulsion of Germans from East Prussia, the yacht club moved to Blankenese, a suburb of Hamburg.

== Description ==
Segelclub RHE has a fleet of Optimists sailing in the Alster, a quiet tributary of the Elbe, on which many of the present day skippers learned. Segelclub RHE's fleet includes also different types of large sailboats, so that there is room for everyone to learn and participate at every level. Segelclub RHE supports the first German team in America's Cup through the United Internet Team Germany. In 2007 this yacht club was a member of the International Council of Yacht Clubs, though it was no longer a member as of June 2017.

The club promotes good comradeship "which goes further than the sailing itself" as its core value. Therefore, it favours socialising as much as sailing and it regularly organizes social events at its club house by the river Elbe.
