= Church of the Holy Family, Kaliningrad =

Church of the Holy Family
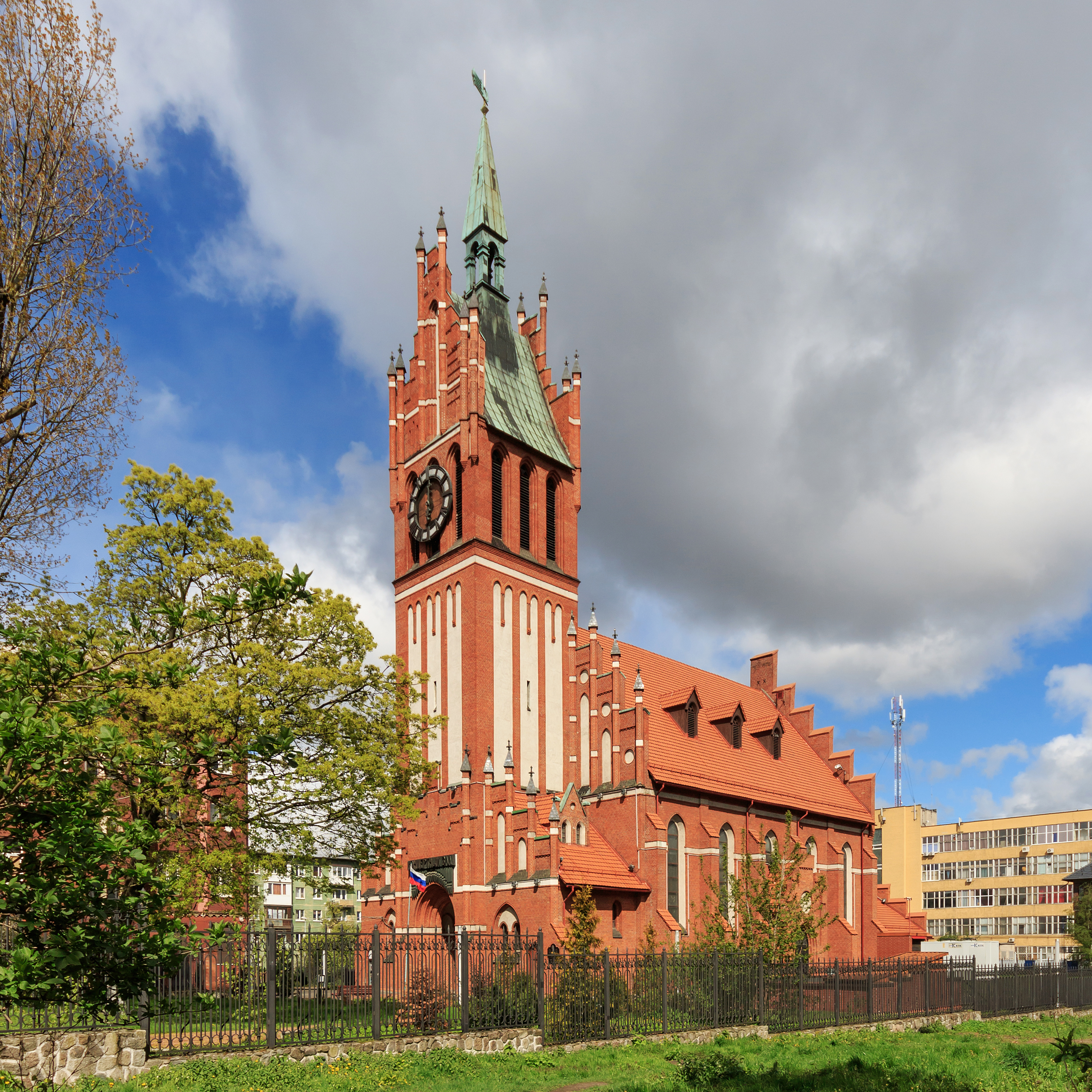
- Catholic Church of the Holy Family in Kaliningrad.
- Church of the Holy Family
- 54°41′52.39″N 20°30′36.05″E
- Location: Kaliningrad
- Country: Russia
- Denomination: Roman Catholic

Architecture
- Architect: Friedrich Heitmann
- Years built: 1904-1907

The Catholic Church of the Holy Family (Russian: Кирха Святого Семейства; German: Kirche zur Heiligen Familie) is a neogothic brick church in Kaliningrad. It was built in the Haberberg city district of Königsberg, near the Pregel river, between 1904 and 1907.

The church was designed by architect Friedrich Heitmann and was built for the Catholic immigrants that were arriving in Königsberg. The church remained largely unharmed during World War II. It was used by the Red Army as a lazaret immediately after the war, and then as a fertilizer depot.

In the beginning of the 1980s the church underwent a minor restoration, and began to function as the concert hall of the Kaliningrad Philharmonic Orchestra. This made possible the installation of a new organ, which with its 44 registers and 3,600 pipes became a favourite of even the best organists of the Saint Petersburg music academy. The clock of the Kreuzkirche church was placed in the tower.

The Kaliningrad authorities have refused to return the church to the Catholic community.
