= Nasser Garten =

German quarter

Coordinates: 54°41′47″N 20°29′07″E

Nasser Garten or Nassengarten was a quarter of Königsberg, Germany, located southwest of the city center. Its territory is now part of the Moskovsky District of Kaliningrad, Russia.

== History ==
The name Nasser Garten name means "wet garden" in German, referring to the watered area it was located in south of the river Pregel. The Königsberg district Ponarth had a similar etymology.

Nasser Garten originally belonged to the village of Haberberg and was documented by Caspar Hennenberger in 1595. In 1626 it was divided by the construction of Königsberg's Baroque city walls. The eastern section within the walls (Alter Nasser Garten) became known as Alter Garten (old garden), while the western unwalled section (Neuer Nasser Garten) was referred to as simply Nasser Garten. In 1648 Caspar Stein referred to the village as In den Sandgraben.

The Brandenburg Gate was the portal between the walled city and Nasser Garten. At the village's western edge was the Nassengärter Gate, where Akzise taxes (octroi) were collected until the 19th century. Nasser Garten was inhabited by peasants operating small vegetable farms and living in mostly single level neoclassical houses. The main roads in the village were Berliner Straße, which contained the cemetery of Haberberg Church, and the eponymous road Nasser Garten. The village came under the administration of Kneiphof in 1743.

The Prussian general Ernst von Rüchel was criticized for ordering Königsberg's garrison to burn parts of Nasser Garten as French troops approached the city during the War of the Fourth Coalition. A skirmish between French and Prussian troops was fought near the Freudenkrug inn and the Nassengärter Gate on 14 June 1807; the inn was subsequently honored. By the end of the 19th century, the Nassengärter Gate was decorated with two brick columns; its hip roofed guardhouse was one of the oldest in Königsberg. The majority of the Fuß-Artillerie-Regiment Nr 1 (von Linger) was barracked along Karlstraße, with the remainder based near the Friedland Gate.

Nasser Garten was separated from the Pregel meadows by a levee known alternately as the Poetensteig, Nassengärter Damm, and Poeten-Damm. It is disputed whether the levee was named after the poet Simon Dach. The area north of the levee would often flood in springtime and have to be drained by post mills propelled by horses; Johann Karl Friedrich Rosenkranz described the process in his Königsberg Skizzen. The levee had to be rebuilt after a flood on 12 February 1894.

By the 20th century Nasser Garten was bordered by Contienen to the west, the industrial harbors on the Pregel to the north, Haberberg to the east, the central train station to the southeast, and the Vorstädtische Wiesen meadowland to the south. Beyond the meadows was Ponarth. Nasser Garten lost much of its farmland during the construction of Königsberg's modern harbors in the 1920s.
