= Königsberg Stock Exchange =

Stock exchange in Königsberg, Germany

Coordinates: 54°42′18″N 20°30′27″E

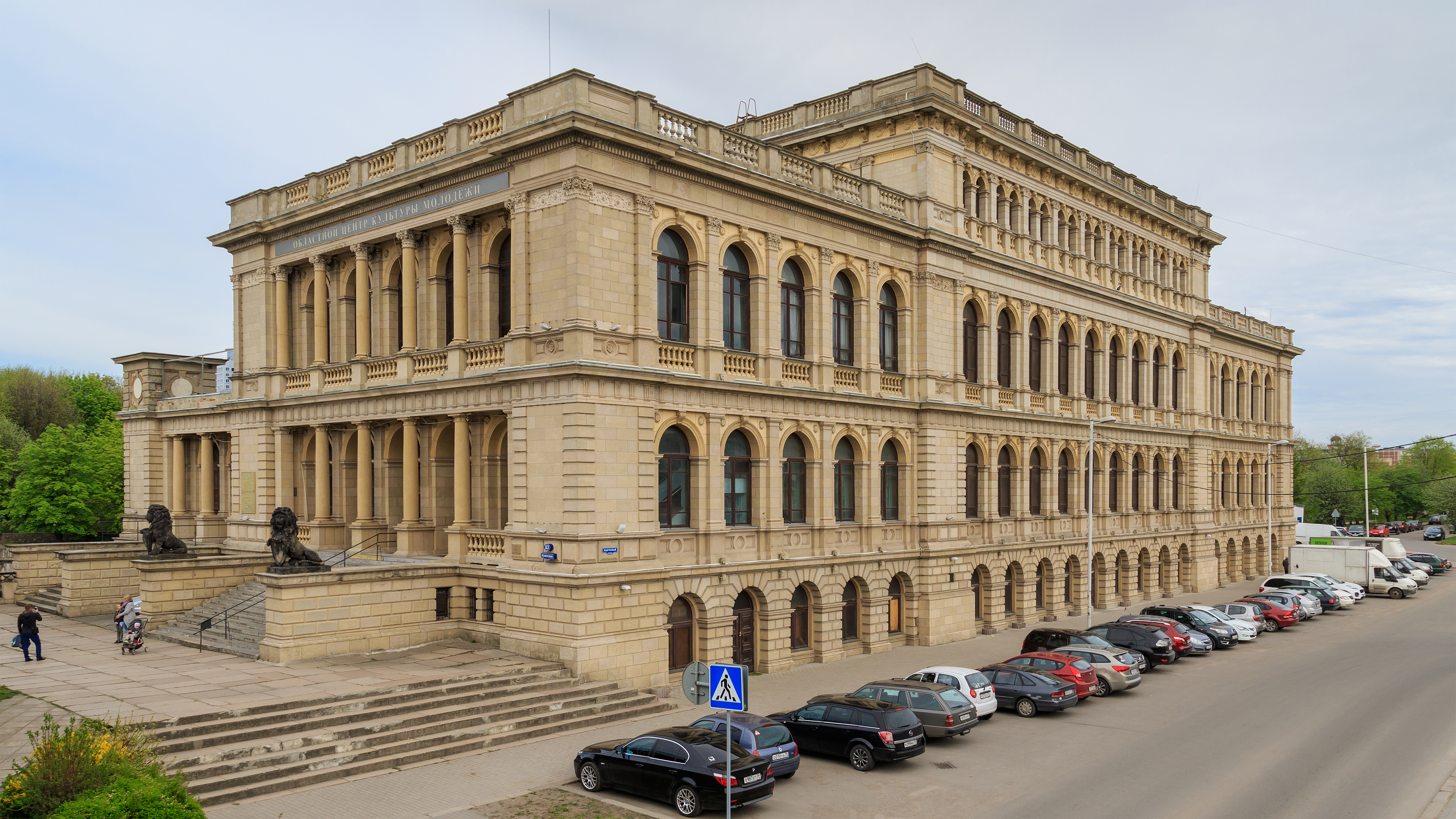
The former stock exchange is now a cultural centre in Kaliningrad.

The Königsberg Stock Exchange (Russian: Здание кёнигсбергской биржи, romanized: Zdaniye kyonigsbergskoy birzhi; German: Königsberger Börse) is a former stock exchange in now Kaliningrad, Russia. One of the few buildings in central Königsberg to survive World War II, it is now a cultural centre.

The first stock exchange in Königsberg was documented in 1619. Four years later, it was located in a new building of Kneiphof on the northern shore of the Alter Pregel; until 1798, it was accessible from the bridge Grüne Brücke. In 1699, Altstadt built its own stock exchange along the Hundegatt branch of the Pregel River. Kneiphof's building was rebuilt in 1798 as its second exchange, but it burned down in 1800. Kneiphof's third exchange was then partially constructed within the river in 1801. It was closed in 1875 because it was too small for the growing city.

Kneiphof's fourth and final stock exchange opened in 1875 in Vordere Vorstadt, along the southern shore of the Pregel opposite the island of Kneiphof. The two-storied building was constructed by the Bremen architect Heinrich Müller from 1870 to 1875. Emil Hundrieser designed its decoration, which included allegorical figures of Europe, Asia, Africa, and America along the roof and two lions at its steps. Königsberg's merchants considered the building to have been built in the Northern Italian Neo-Renaissance style. Aside from its business activities, the building also hosted concerts and political meetings. Because the Kunsthalle was used by the German Army's postal service during World War I, exhibitions were held instead at the stock exchange.

The stock exchange was heavily damaged by the 1944 Bombing of Königsberg and the 1945 Battle of Königsberg and became part of Soviet Kaliningrad after World War II. While most ruined buildings in the city were demolished, the Soviet authorities decided to rebuild the former stock exchange in 1967 into a marine cultural centre because they considered it to contain elements of Russian neo-classical architecture.

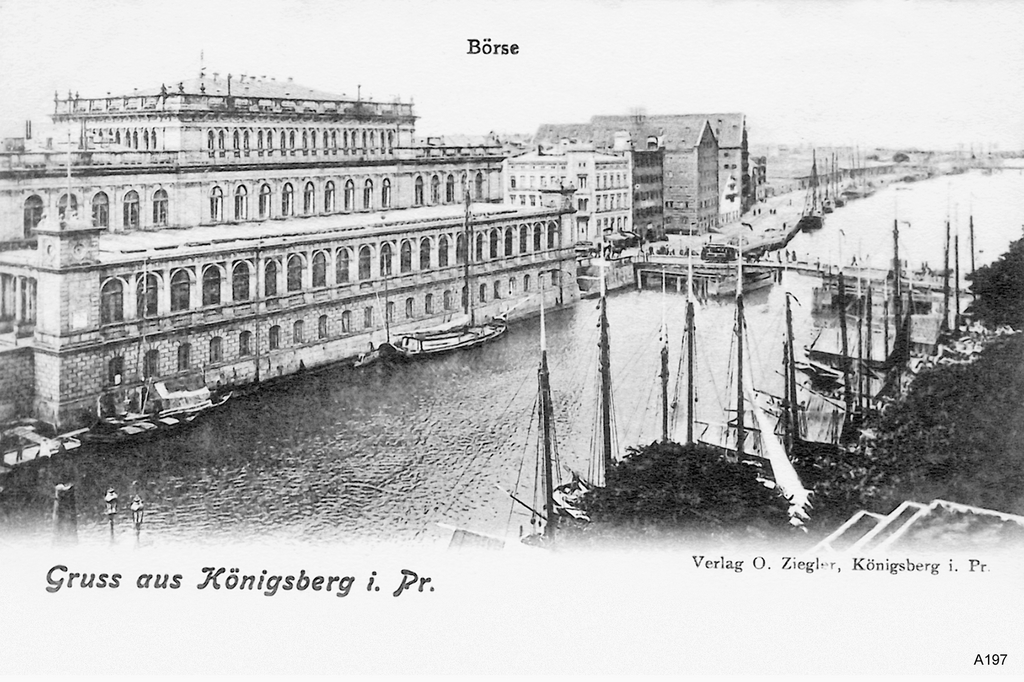
Königsberg Stock Exchange and the Pregel River

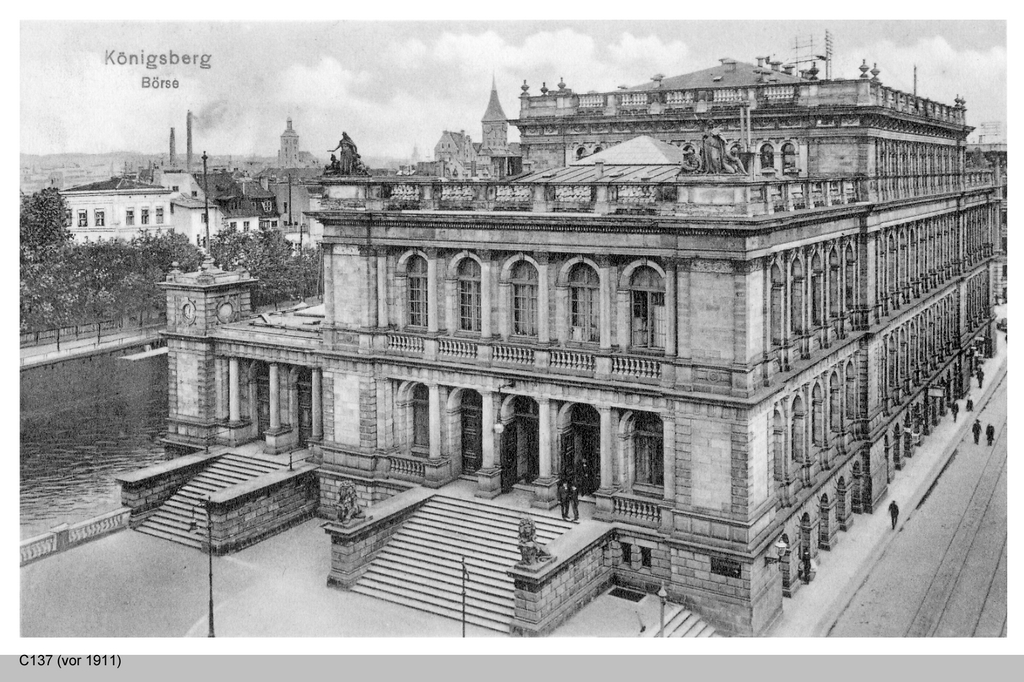
Königsberg Stock Exchange

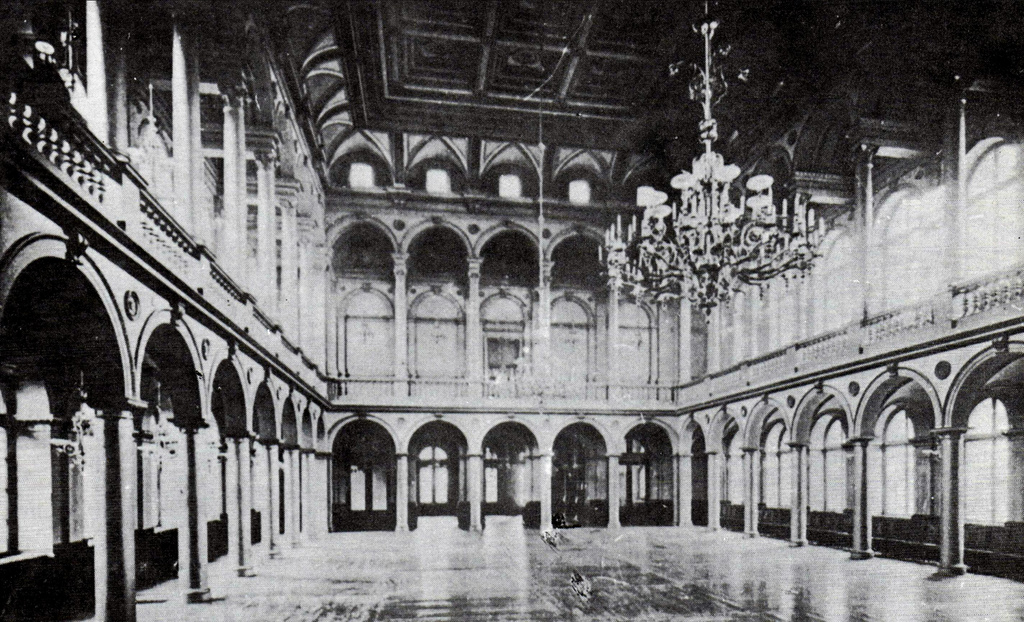
Former interior of the stock exchange

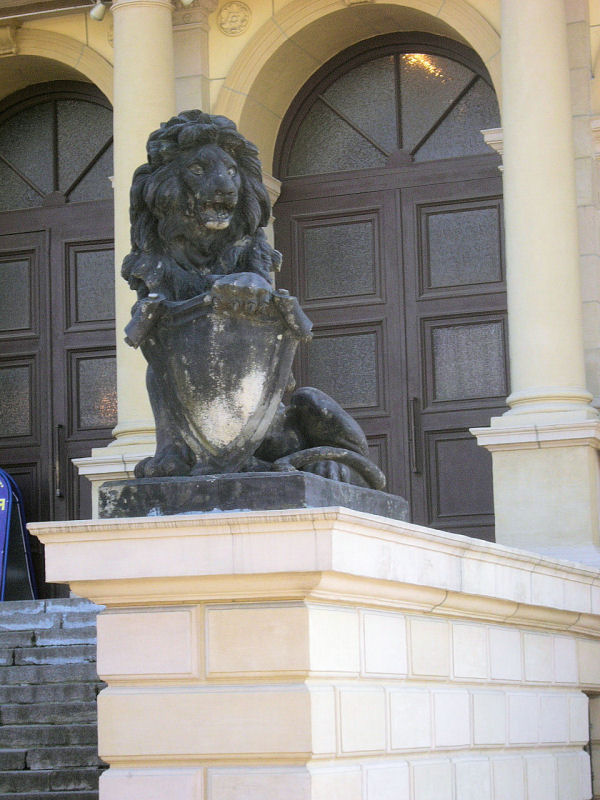
Lion statues before the building

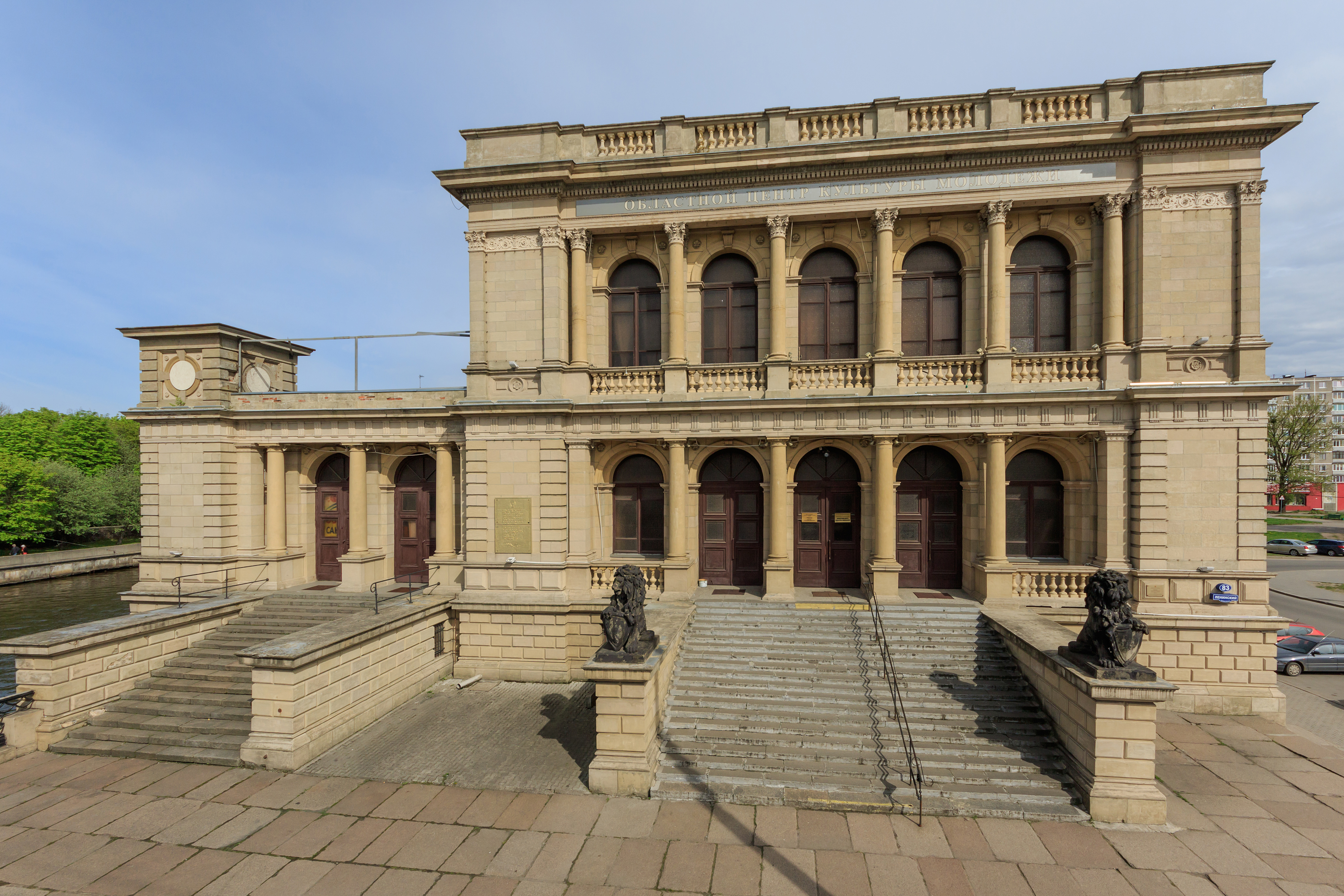
Main portal

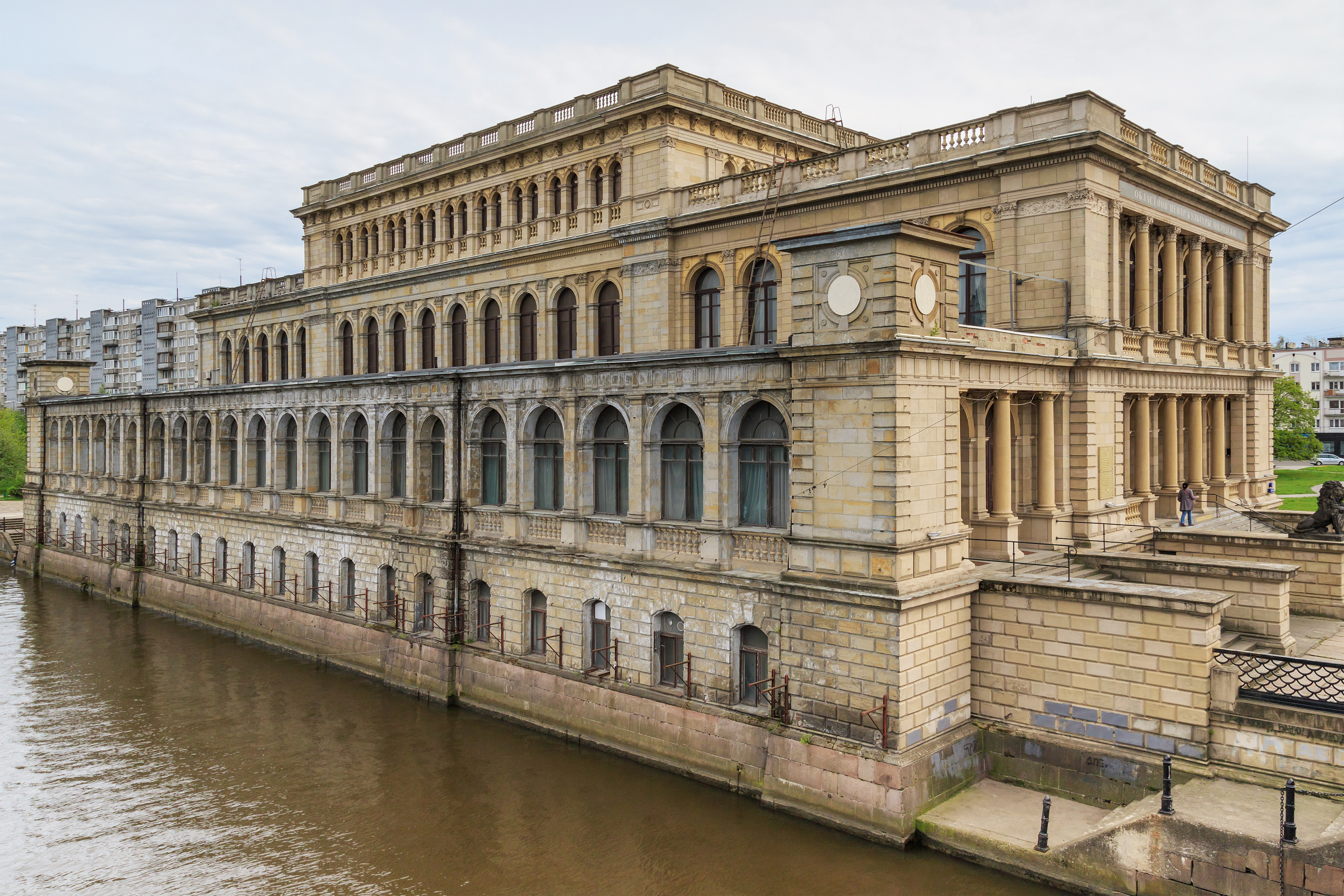
Facade to the river

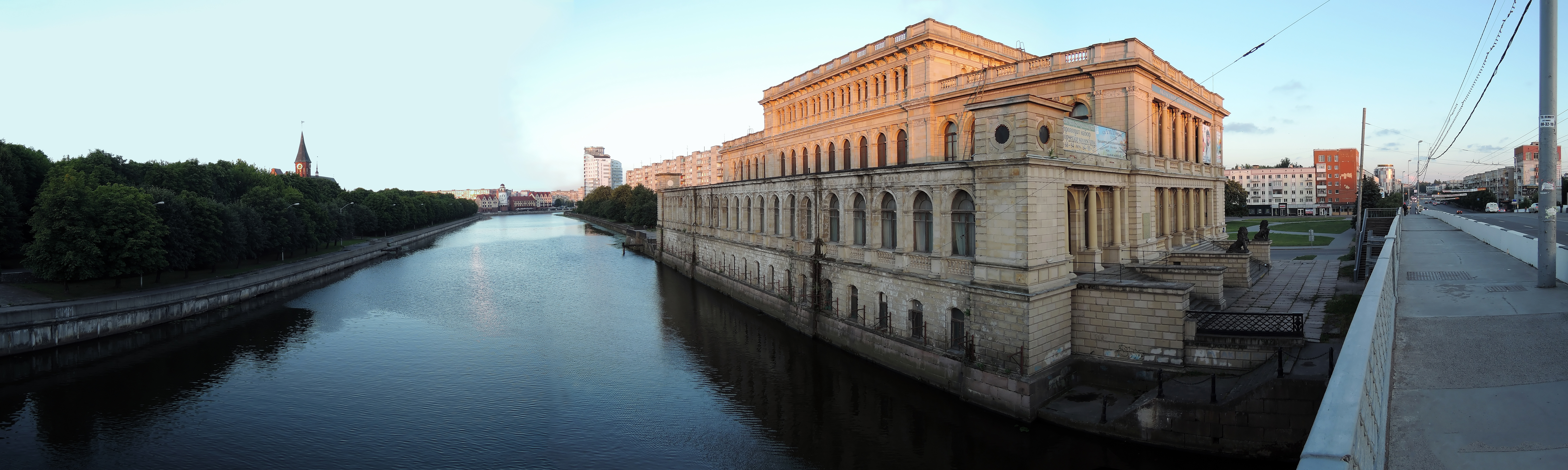
Panoramic view of the stock exchange building, Pregel River (center), Kneiphof island (left) and Estakadnyi Bridge (right) in Summer 2014
