= Haffstrom =

Part of Königsberg, Germany

Coordinates: 54°40′19″N 20°24′20″E

Haffstrom was first a fishing village and then a quarter of southwestern Königsberg, Germany. Its territory is now part of the Moskovsky District of Kaliningrad, Russia.

== History ==
Haffstrom was located along the northeastern shore of the Vistula Lagoon or Frisches Haff, south of the Pregel river mouth. The village was burned by Polish troops during the 1520 Horsemen's War. On 9 May 1525 the mayor of Altstadt, Nikolaus Richau, welcomed Albert, Duke of Prussia, at an inn in Haffstrom before the new duke entered his capital of Königsberg.

The pianomaker Carl Julius Gebauhr (1809–81) was a native of Haffstrom. Haffstrom received an infantry base in 1912 to support the Königsberg fortifications. The village was incorporated into the city of Königsberg in 1939. The nearest quarter was Kalgen to the east.

== Parish church ==
In a document from 17 November 1349, Grand Master Heinrich von Dusemer of the Teutonic Knights named the chapel of Haffstrom as controlled by the village Lichtenhagen near Kobbelbude, with Lichtenhagen itself under the control of a convent in Königsberg. In 1363 it was separated from Lichtenhagen and became a separate parish within the deanery of Kreuzburg. The parish church was rebuilt numerous times over centuries. Other localities within the parish were Maulen and Wundlacken. The pulpit and confessional were dated ca. 1700, its stained glass windows were sponsored by Richard Friedrich zu Dohna-Schlobitten in 1837, and the organ was from 1850. Its bell from 1701 survived World War II and is in the Protestant church of Groß Lobke near Hildesheim.
