= Haberberg Church =

Haberberg church
- Haberberger Kirche
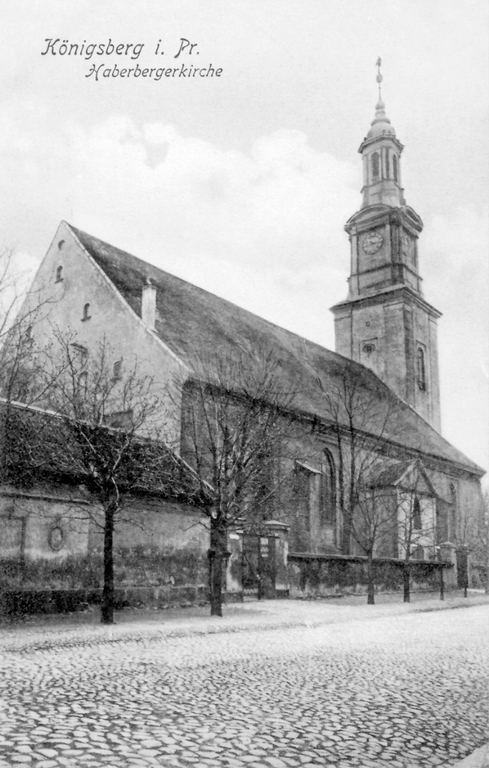
- Haberberg church
- 54°41′47″N 20°30′08″E
- Denomination: Lutheran

History
- Status: Not preserved
- Founded: 1537

Architecture
- Style: Baroque
- Years built: 1748-1753

Haberberg Church (German: Haberberger Kirche) or Holy Trinity Church (German: St. Trinitatis-Kirche) was a Protestant church in the Haberberg quarter of Königsberg, Germany. Its 18th-century Rococo interior was one of the most beautiful in East Prussia.

== History ==
Construction of the church began with a chapel at the highest point of Oberhaberberg in 1537. The Lutheran community became its own parish separate from that of Königsberg Cathedral in 1652, and a new church was built from 1653 to 1683 with its steeple following in 1705. After burning down because of a winter lightning strike in 1747, the rebuilt church was rebuilt from 1748 to 1753 and dedicated in the latter year. Its organ, designed by Adam Gottlob Casparini, was completed in 1753, with its altar following in 1765.

In 1774 the church's steeple was topped with a weathervane by the Königsberg coppersmith Lorenz Wietander, depicting a single-winged golden angel. Upon the recommendation of Immanuel Kant, it became the first church of Königsberg with a lightning rod in 1783.

The church was used as a field hospital for Russian troops following the Battle of Eylau of 7–8 February 1807. A shell struck the church during the bombardment of Königsberg by French troops on 14 June.

The parish's cemetery was located in Nasser Garten. In 1905 the community of Ponarth became its own parish separate from that of Haberberg.

Haberberg Church was heavily damaged during the 1945 Battle of Königsberg. Its remnants were demolished sometime before 1975 while part of Kaliningrad, Russia.

== Gallery ==
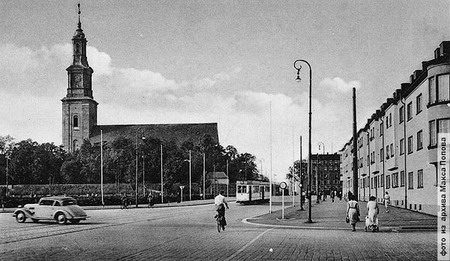
View from the train station

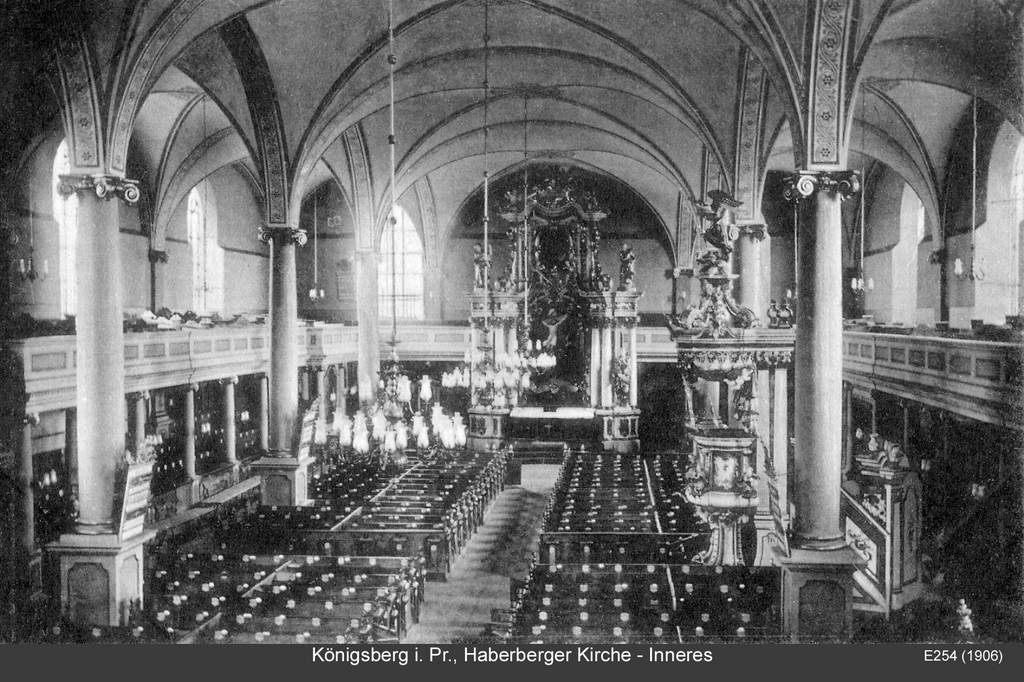
Rococo interior

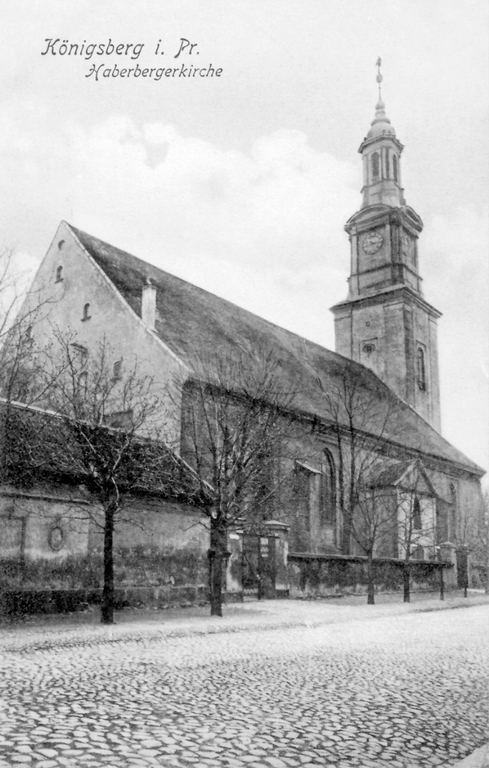
View from Brandenburg Gate
