= Lutherkirche, Königsberg =

German Protestant church

Lutherkirche
- Lutherkirche
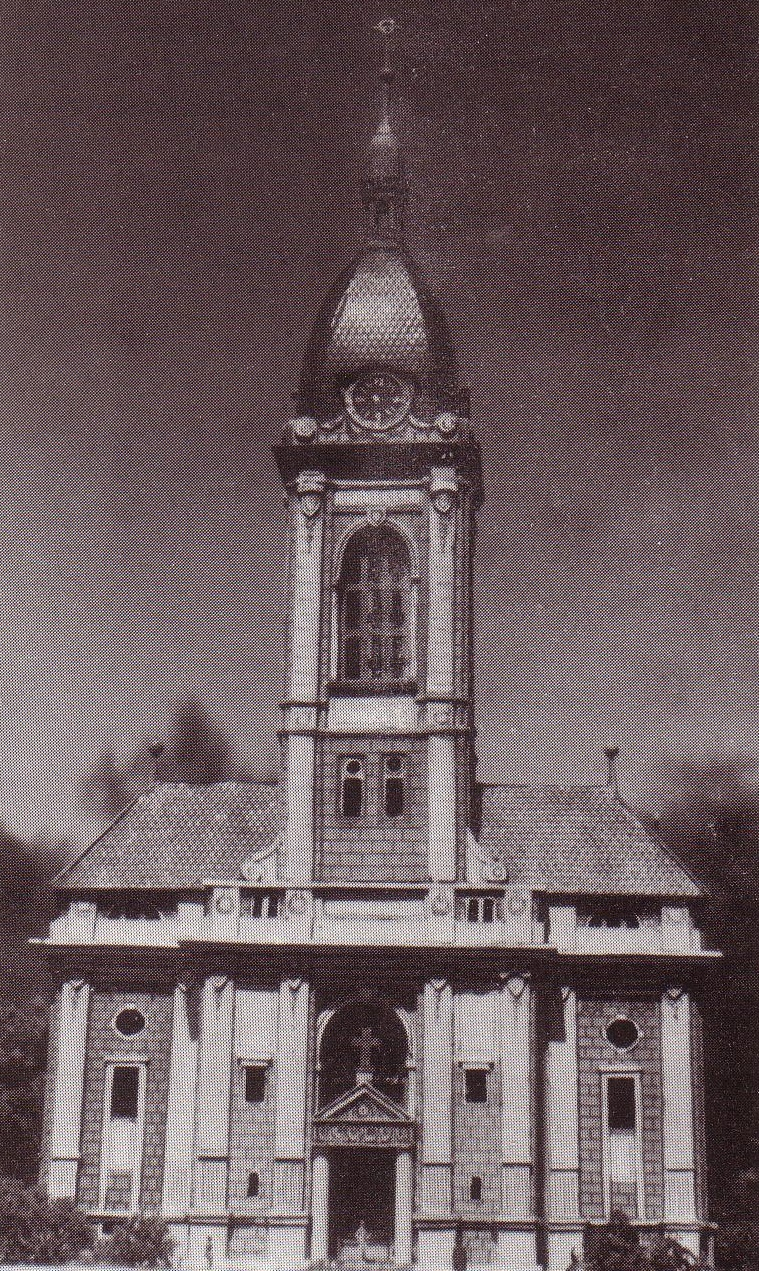
- Lutherkirche
- 54°41′51″N 20°31′03″E
- Denomination: Lutheran

History
- Status: Not preserved
- Founded: 1907
- Consecrated: 1910

Architecture
- Architect: Friedrich Heitmann
- Years built: 3
- Completed: 1910
- Demolished: 1976

The Lutherkirche was a Protestant church named after Martin Luther in southern Königsberg, Germany. It was located in the Haberberg quarter of Königsberg.

== History ==
The Lutherkirche was designed by the architect Friedrich Heitmann and located at the Viehmarkt, a market in the Haberberg quarter. The Neo-Renaissance church with Baroque decorations was built from 1907 to 1910 and dedicated on 18 December 1910. Although the Lutherkirche survived the 1944 Bombing of Königsberg and 1945 Battle of Königsberg, it was not used by the Soviet Union in Kaliningrad after World War II and was abandoned, eventually being demolished in May 1976.

== Gallery ==
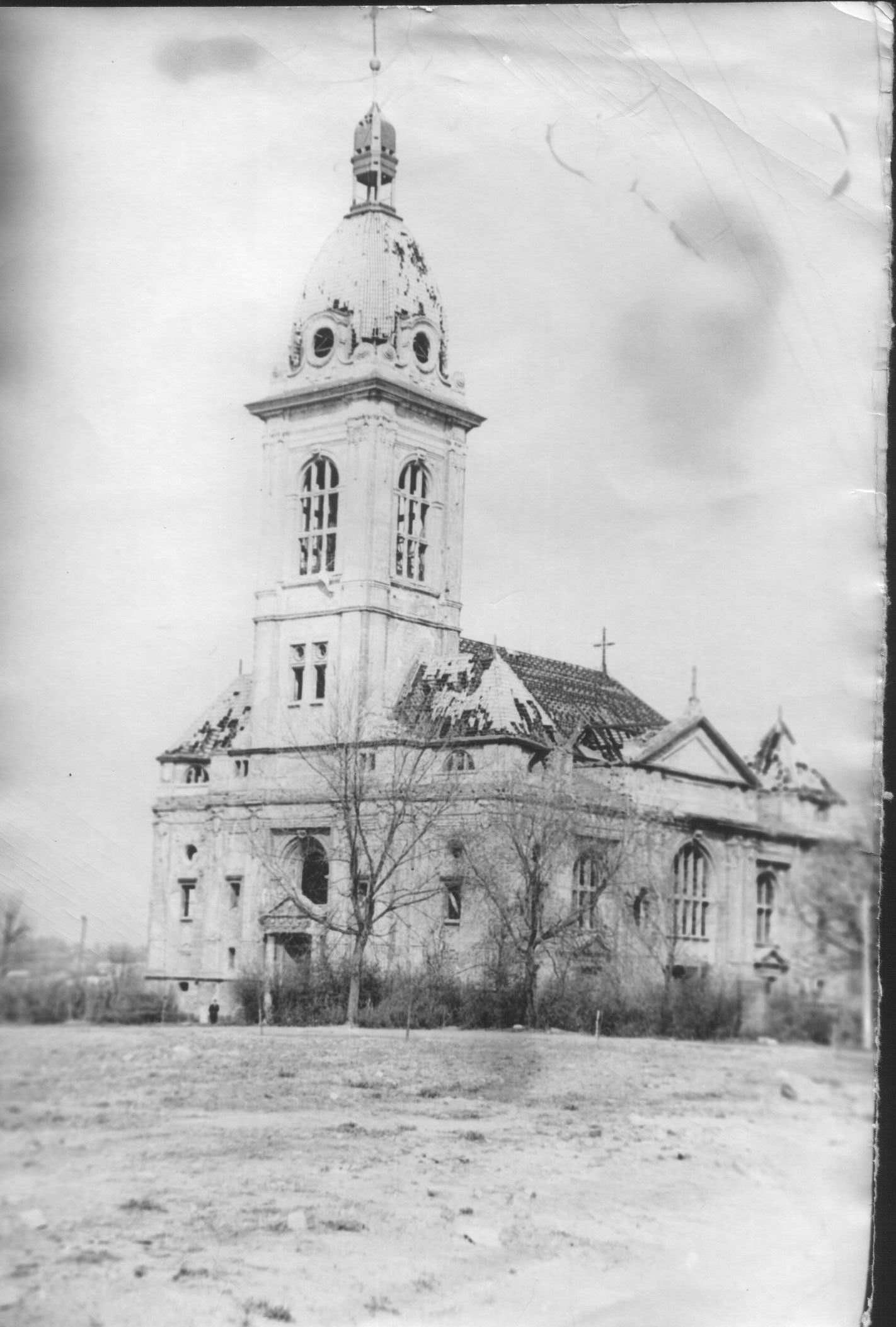
Picture of the Lutherkirche taken between 1960 and 1976
