= Kreuzkirche, Kaliningrad =

Kreuzkirche
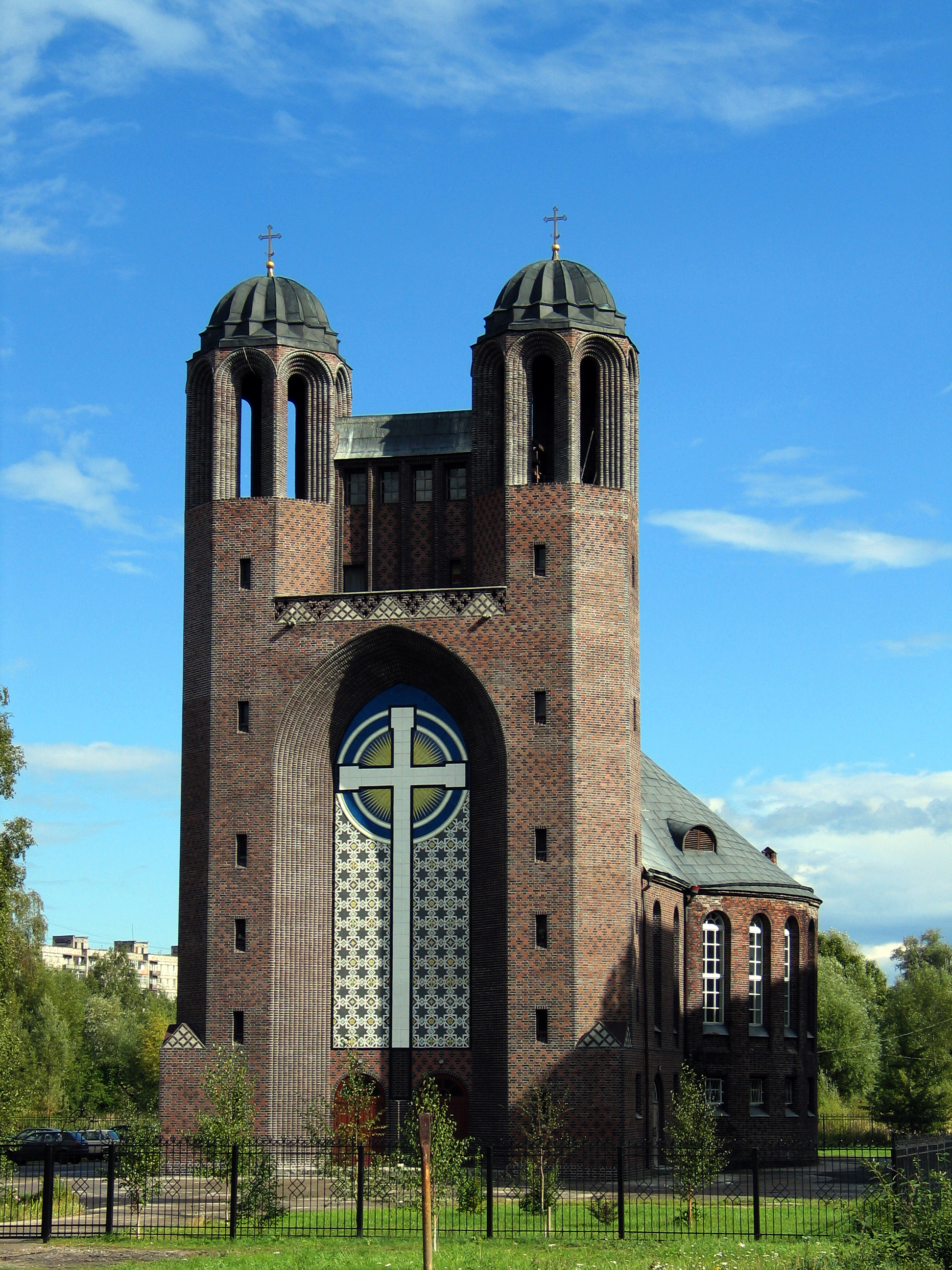
- The Kaliningrad Kreuzkirche.
- Kreuzkirche
- 54°42′20.66″N 20°31′21.46″E
- Location: Kaliningrad
- Country: Russia
- Denomination: Russian Orthodox
- Previous denomination: Protestant

Architecture
- Architect: Arthur Kickton
- Style: Brick Expressionism
- Years built: 1930-1933
- Closed: 1944-1988

The Kreuzkirche is a church in the former city district of Lomse in Königsberg, Germany, now Kaliningrad, Russia. The church was designed by architect Arthur Kickton and built between 1930 and 1933 for the evangelical community of Königsberg. A monumental cross from Kadyny maiolica is situated between the two towers of the church.

The church was only lightly damaged in World War II and became a garage and a factory for fishing equipment thereafter. After a fire it was decided in 1988 to use the building as a church for the Kaliningrad Orthodox community. Both towers were connected to the nave in the restoration that followed. The original clock of the church now hangs on the Church of the Holy Family in Kaliningrad.

== Literature ==
- Robert Albinus: Königsberg-Lexikon. Würzburg 2002, ISBN 3-88189-441-1
- Richard Armstedt: Geschichte der königl. Haupt- und Residenzstadt Königsberg in Preußen. Reprint of the original edition, Stuttgart 1899.
- Fritz Gause: Die Geschichte der Stadt Königsberg in Preußen. 3 Bände, Köln 1996, ISBN 3-412-08896-X
- Jürgen Manthey: Königsberg – Geschichte einer Weltbürgerrepublik. Hanser 2005, ISBN 3-446-20619-1
- Gunnar Strunz: Königsberg entdecken, Berlin 2006, ISBN 3-89794-071-X
- Baldur Köster: Königsberg: Architektur aus deutscher Zeit. Husum Druck, 2000, ISBN 3-88042-923-5.
