= Oktyabrsky Island =

Island in Kaliningrad, Russia

Coordinates: 54.698°N 20.543°E

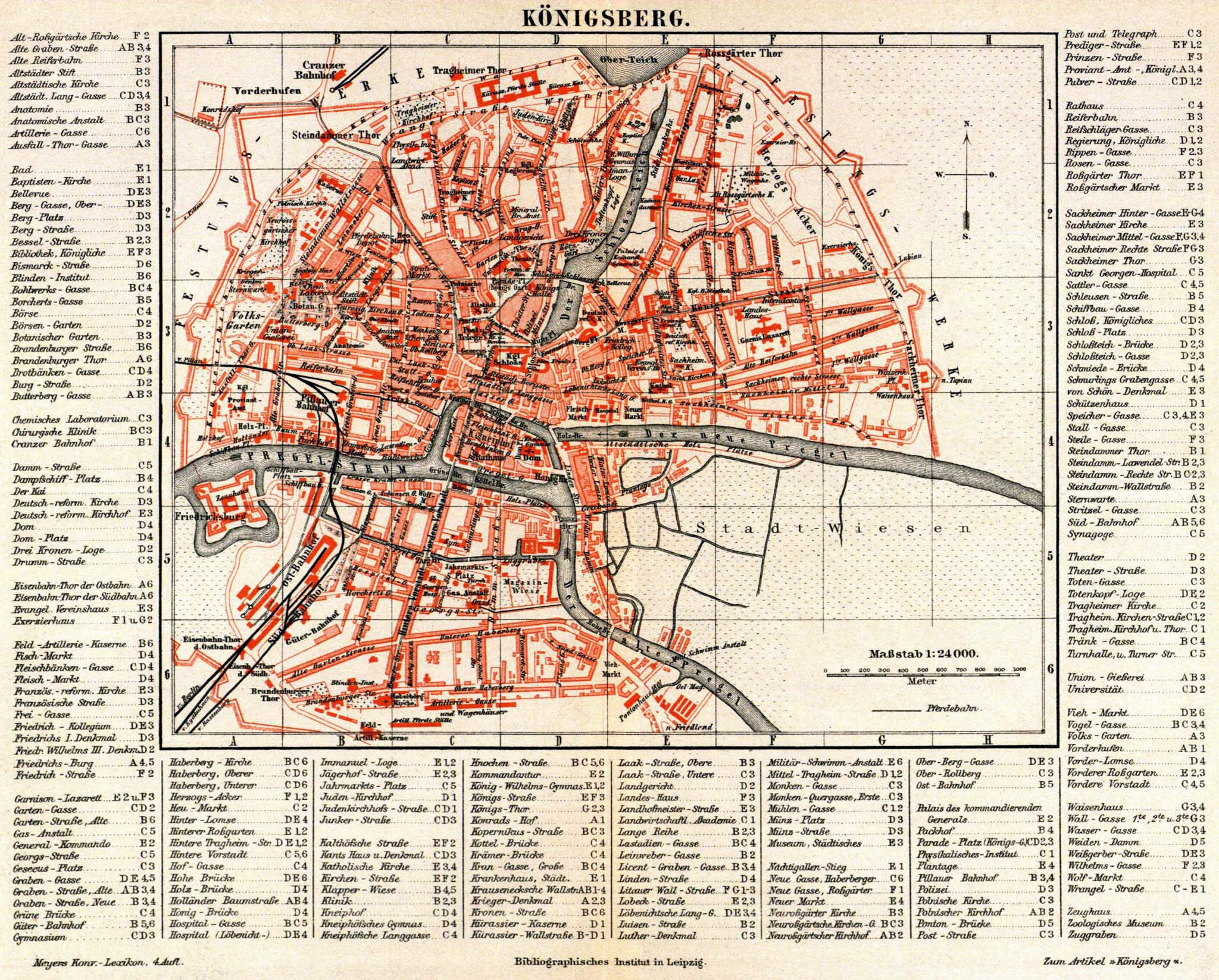
1880s map of Königsberg, with Lomse in the southeast marked Stadt-Wiesen ('City Meadows')

Oktyabrsky Island (Russian: Остров Октябрьский, meaning "October [Revolution] Island") is an island in the Pregolya River in Kaliningrad, the capital of Kaliningrad Oblast, an exclave of Russia. The island, covering about 10 square kilometres (3.9 sq mi), is immediately east (upriver) of the city's historic centre. When Kaliningrad was the German Königsberg, the island was called Lomse (Old Prussian for 'swamps') and largely used for grazing, except for the district also known as Lomse at its western end. In the 2010s the island was extensively redeveloped around the Kaliningrad Stadium, constructed for the 2018 FIFA World Cup held in Russia.

== River channels ==
The German name for the Pregolya River was the Pregel. The two channels of the Pregel, flowing to the north and south of Lomse Island, were called Neuer ('new') or Samländischer ('of Sambia') and Alter ('old') or Natangischer ('of Natangia') respectively.

== History ==
A wooden bridge from Löbenicht was built in 1404, and the island was used to store wood. In the mid-15th century, the Germans built an earthen dam and began to dig canals to drain the land, converting it from unused marshes to pastureland. Outside the developed western end of the island, building houses was prohibited as the soil was unstable. In the early 17th century, the government built a second belt of fortifications around Königsberg, which included the Wiesen-Front trench and bastion crossing Lomse from north to south. Three bridges of the famous Seven Bridges of Königsberg mathematical problem connected to Lomse.
