= Kaliningrad Stadium =

Football stadium in Kaliningrad, Russia

Rostec Arena
- Ростех Арена
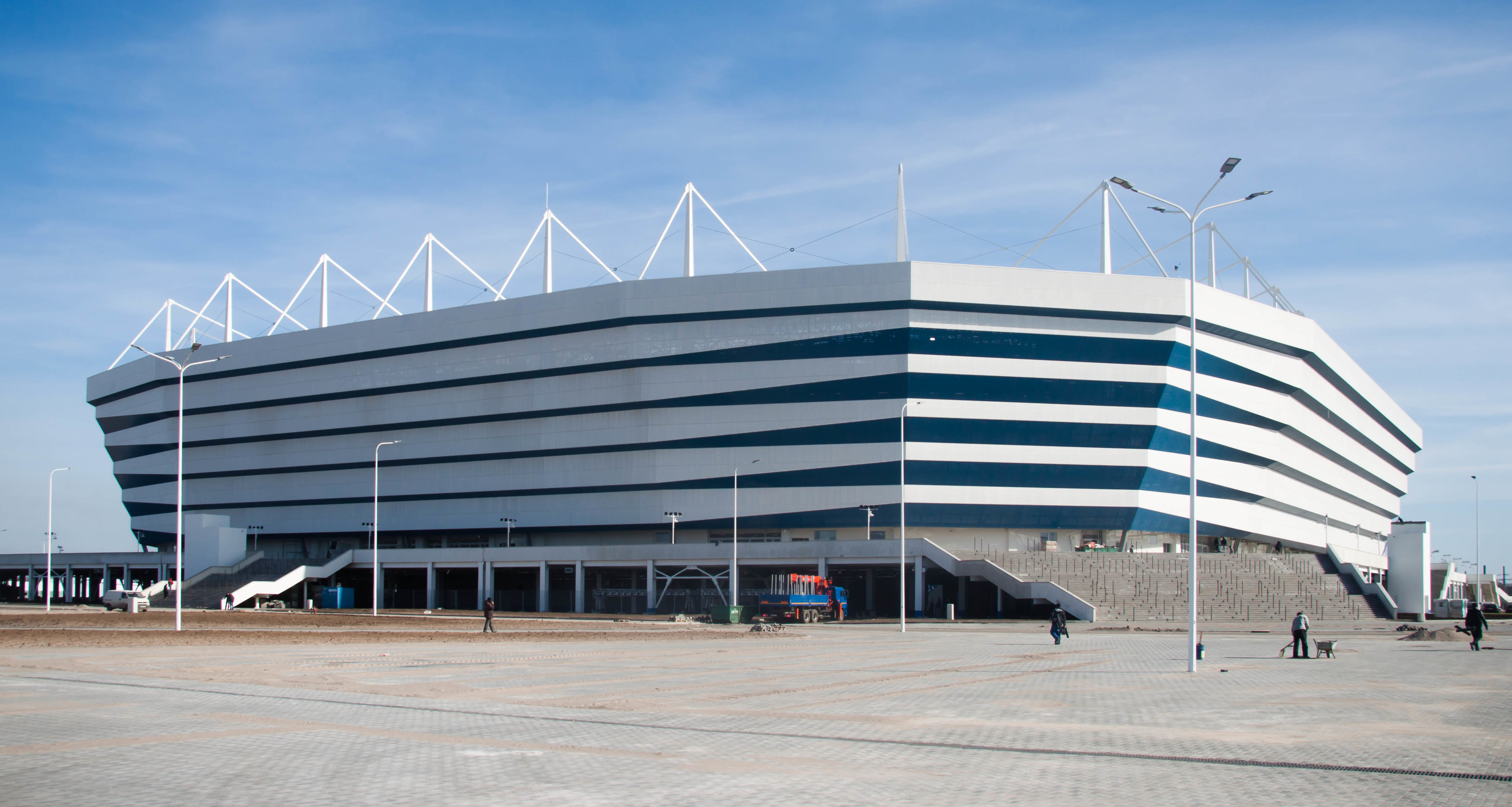
- UEFA
- Interactive map of Rostec Arena
- Former names: Kaliningrad Stadium
- Location: Solnechnyy Bul'var, Kaliningrad, Russia
- Coordinates: 54°41′53″N 20°32′02″E
- Capacity: 35,016
- Surface: Grass
- Field size: 105 x 68 m

Construction
- Groundbreaking: 2015
- Built: 2016–2018
- Opened: 12 May 2018
- Cost: € 257 million
- Architect: Jean-Michel Wilmotte

Tenants
- FC Baltika Kaliningrad (2018–present); Russia national football team (selected matches)

Kaliningrad Stadium (Russian: Стадион Калининград), known for sponsorship reasons as the Rostec Arena (Russian: Ростех Арена) since August 2023, is a football stadium on Oktyabrsky Island, Kaliningrad, Russia, which hosted four games of the 2018 FIFA World Cup. It hosts FC Baltika Kaliningrad of the Russian Premier League, replacing Baltika Stadium.

Its project is based on the concept of the Allianz Arena, which hosted matches of the 2006 World Cup in Germany. The first match was played on 11 April 2018, a football match between FC Baltika and PFC Krylia Sovetov Samara.

== History ==
The stadium was the westernmost location of the 2018 World Cup. In April 2012, the regional government chose the French architectural bureau Wilmotte & Associes, SA stadium construction project. NPO Mostovik & Mersfor Rus OOO were project partners and the Kaliningrad Region and Russian Federation were the project managers. The project itself is worth $280 million.

In June 2014 the Omsk Arbitration Court declared "Mostovik" bankrupt and, in March 2015, termination of the contract with the company began. On 1 April 2014 a government order published by the government declared the appointment of ZAO "Crocus International" as the sole executor of the Ministry of Sports of the Russian Federation for the works on the construction. The state contract was signed between the Government of the Kaliningrad Oblast and Crocus International "to develop the project and working documentation on the design of the stadium".

On 10 June 2015 it was reported that the stadium project was sent to the state examination. On 20 July, the layout of the stadium was presented.

At first, regional authorities considered the option with the construction of new sports facilities in the city center, on the place of the current Baltika Stadium. Finally, in December 2014 it was announced that Oktyabrsky Island will be the location of the new stadium, even though it is often under threat of flooding. and work on it requires additional financial investments.

On 10 August 2015, it became known that the stadium would be named "Stadium Kaliningrad" or in the English version, Kaliningrad Stadium.

== Construction ==
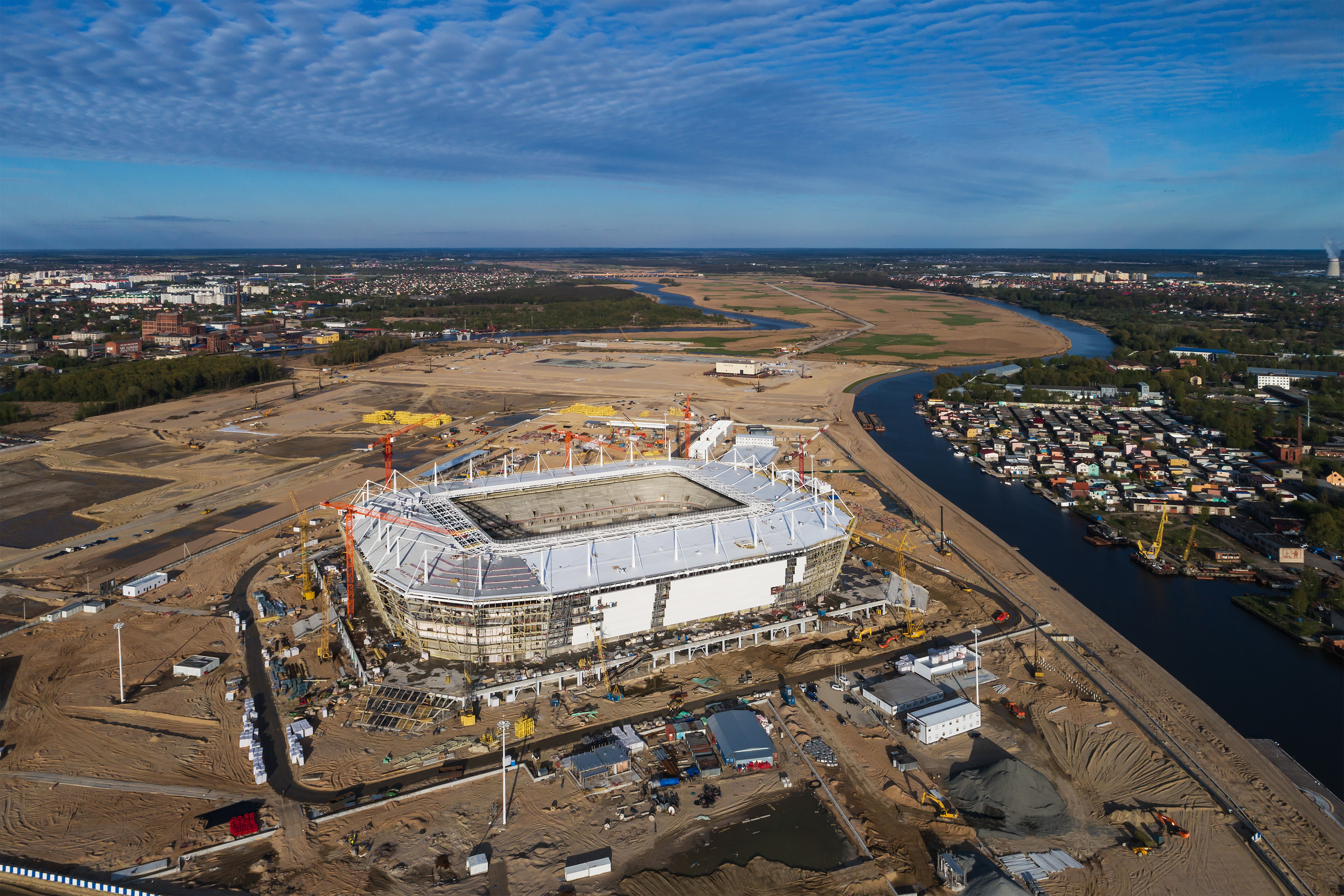
Aerial photography, May 2017

The project was based on the concept of the Allianz Arena Munich, which hosted matches of the 2006 World Cup in Germany. The project cost was anticipated as 11 billion rubles but was exceeded by far. Soil compaction work was completed in December 2014. Preparation work for construction of the infrastructure started in January 2015. In addition, a new bridge was built over the river to provide better connections to the surrounding area. Testing for the stadium piles and foundation began in July 2014. As a multiple-purpose arena, Kaliningrad Stadium can be used for football matches and other sporting events, conferences and concerts.

=== Safety and security ===
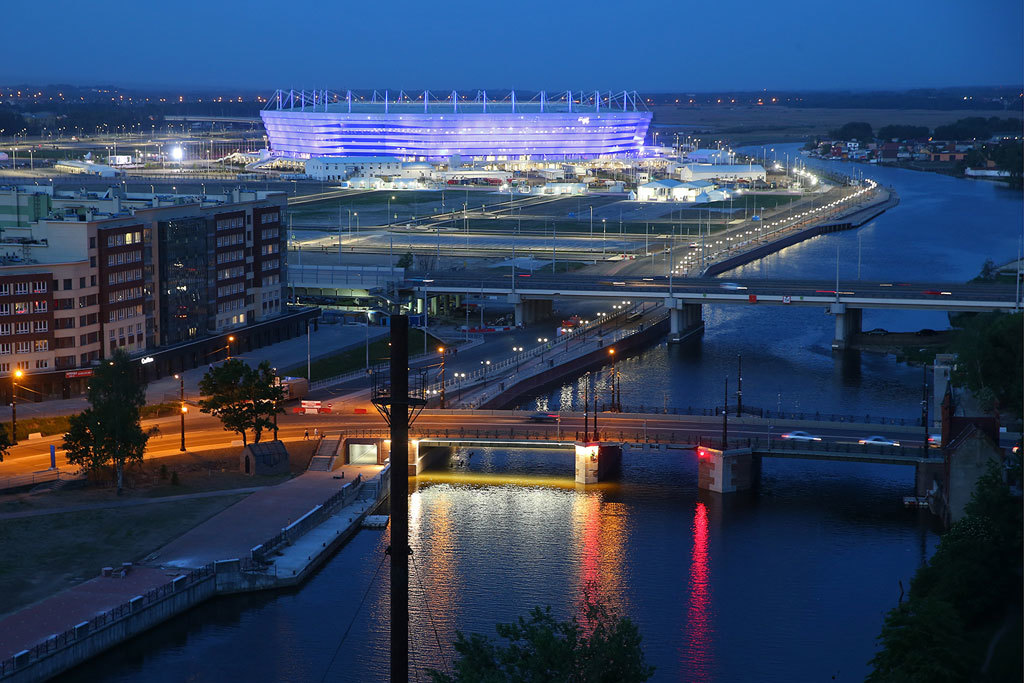
Rostec Arena in the evening

This is a two-tier stadium with a VIP section, equipped with ultramodern security systems and CCTV. The stadium is equipped with more than 700 security cameras.

== Work on consolidation and drainage of Oktyabrsky Island ==
During excavation, some pre-war buildings' infrastructure was found which was not marked on the topographic survey. These issues have been dealt with. The project includes construction of the overpass East from Oktyabrsky island and from the street.

== Tournament results ==
=== 2018 FIFA World Cup ===
Kaliningrad Stadium hosted four games for the 2018 FIFA World Cup.

Date	Time	Team #1	Result	Team #2	Round	Attendance
16 June 2018	21:00	Croatia	2–0	Nigeria	Group D	31,136
22 June 2018	20:00	Serbia	1–2	Switzerland	Group E	33,167
25 June 2018	20:00	Spain	2–2	Morocco	Group B	33,973
28 June 2018	20:00	England	0–1	Belgium	Group G	33,973

=== 2019 European Under-18 Rugby Union Championship ===
Date	Time	Team #1	Res.	Team #2	Round	Attendance
20 April 2019	17:00	Russia U18	27–38	Portugal U18	Bronze final	8,100
20 April 2019	19:00	(Georgia (country)) Georgia U18	20–10	Spain U18	Final	9,700

=== 2020 Rugby Europe Championship ===
Date	Time	Team #1	Result	Team #2	Round	Attendance
22 February 2020	16:00	Russia	19–18	Portugal	Championship	11,378

=== 2021 Rugby Europe Championship ===
Date	Time	Team #1	Result	Team #2	Round	Attendance
20 March 2021	15:00	Russia	6–23	Georgia	Championship	9,564

== After the World Cup ==
The seating capacity of 35,000 seats was to be reduced to 25,000 before the stadium was handed over to the football club Baltika, which had 4,000 spectators to matches in 2017. In March 2019 the federal government allocated 40 million rubles to renovate the stadium.

== See also ==
- List of football stadiums in Russia
- Lists of stadiums
