= Ponarth =

Human settlement in Russia

Coordinates: 54.6819°N 20.4786°E

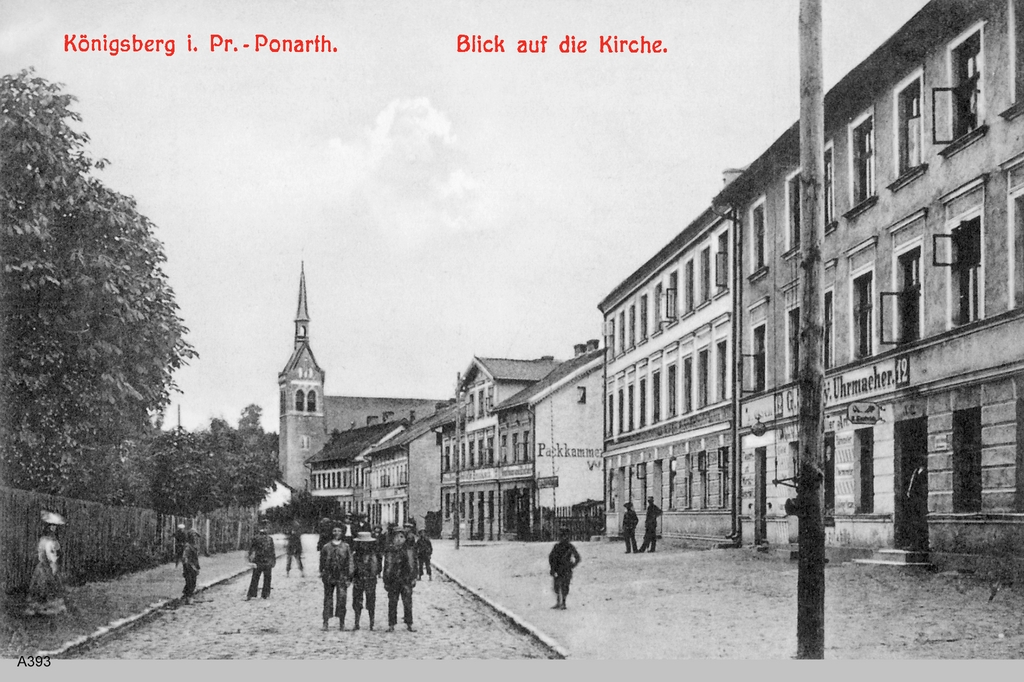
Ponarth

Dimitrovo (Russian: Димитрово) is part of the Moskovsky District of Kaliningrad, Russia. Until 1947, it was known by its German language name Ponarth as first a suburb of and then a quarter of Königsberg, Germany, located southwest of the city center.

== History ==
Ponarth was known in the Middle Ages as Penarth and was located in a forest known as the Penarthsches Wald. The name was of Old Prussian origin (pa nartas or po nariatas) and referred to the wetlands of the Pregel River basin, similar to Nasser Garten to the north. First mentioned under the jurisdiction of the Schulze Conrad in 1328, it was documented as a German village with Kulm law in 1385 as part of the state of the Teutonic Order. In 1467 it was granted to Mathes Scheunemann, a licentiate employed by the Teutonic Knights. In 1482 Ponarth passed to Kunz Pfersfelder, a mercenary captain from Karschau.

Ponarth had to be rebuilt after being burned down by Polish troops during the 1520 Horsemen's War. In 1599 it passed to Albrecht von Kittlitz, who exchanged it with Duke George Frederick. In 1609 Duke John Sigismund granted Ponarth to the Königsberg town of Löbenicht. In 1679 Ponarth's houses were dismantled during the approach of Swedish troops (see Great Sleigh Drive).

For the price of a Düttchen, a type of Silbergroschen, Königsberg citizens could take a Düttchenpost carriage from the city gates to surrounding suburbs. Ponarth and the Karschau heathland became popular sites for excursions ca. 1790, with citizens drinking coffee amongst its linden trees. The French corps of Marshal Davout stayed in the village in 1812.

The farming village Ponarth grew rapidly into a working class suburb through late 19th century industrialization; a Hauptwerkstatt of the Prussian Eastern Railway was built in eastern Ponarth. Johann Philipp Schifferdecker moved his small Bavarian-style brewery from Löbenicht's Tuchmacherstraße to Ponarth in 1849; it became an Aktiengesellschaft in 1869. The Aktien-Gesellschaft Brauerei Ponarth grew into one of the largest breweries in northern Germany. Nearby Schönbusch, which also had its own brewery, was added to Ponarth on 14 October 1893. Ponarth also contained an artillery depot affiliated with the shooting range in nearby Karschau. By 1902 Ponarth was connected by roads to Nasser Garten and central Königsberg to the north, Speichersdorf to the east, Karschau to the south, and Schönbusch. Other nearby quarters were Prappeln to the southwest, Spandienen to the west, and Aweiden to the southeast.

Previously part of the rural district of Königsberg (Landkreis Königsberg i. Pr.), Ponarth was merged into the urban district of Königsberg (Stadtkreis Königsberg i. Pr) in 1905. Ponarth's wooded park contained a bar known as Müllers Garten, known after 1900 as Südpark. The landscape was improved through development of the ponds Hubertusteich and Schwanenteich, and the park Friedrichsruh. Two large housing developments were built in 1912.

Churches in the quarter included the Ponarth Church for Lutherans, St. Joseph's Church for Catholics, and the Baptistenkirche for Baptists. The athletics club MTV Ponarth played its home games in Ponarth.

Königsberg was transferred to Soviet control in 1945 after World War II. Königsberg was subsequently renamed to Kaliningrad and Ponarth to Dimitrovo.

== Historical population ==
- 1867: 233
- 1871: 441
- 1885: 1,884
- 1895: 4,425
- 1900: 8,074
