= Ponarth Church =

Church in Kaliningrad, Russia

Ponarth church
- Ponarther kirche
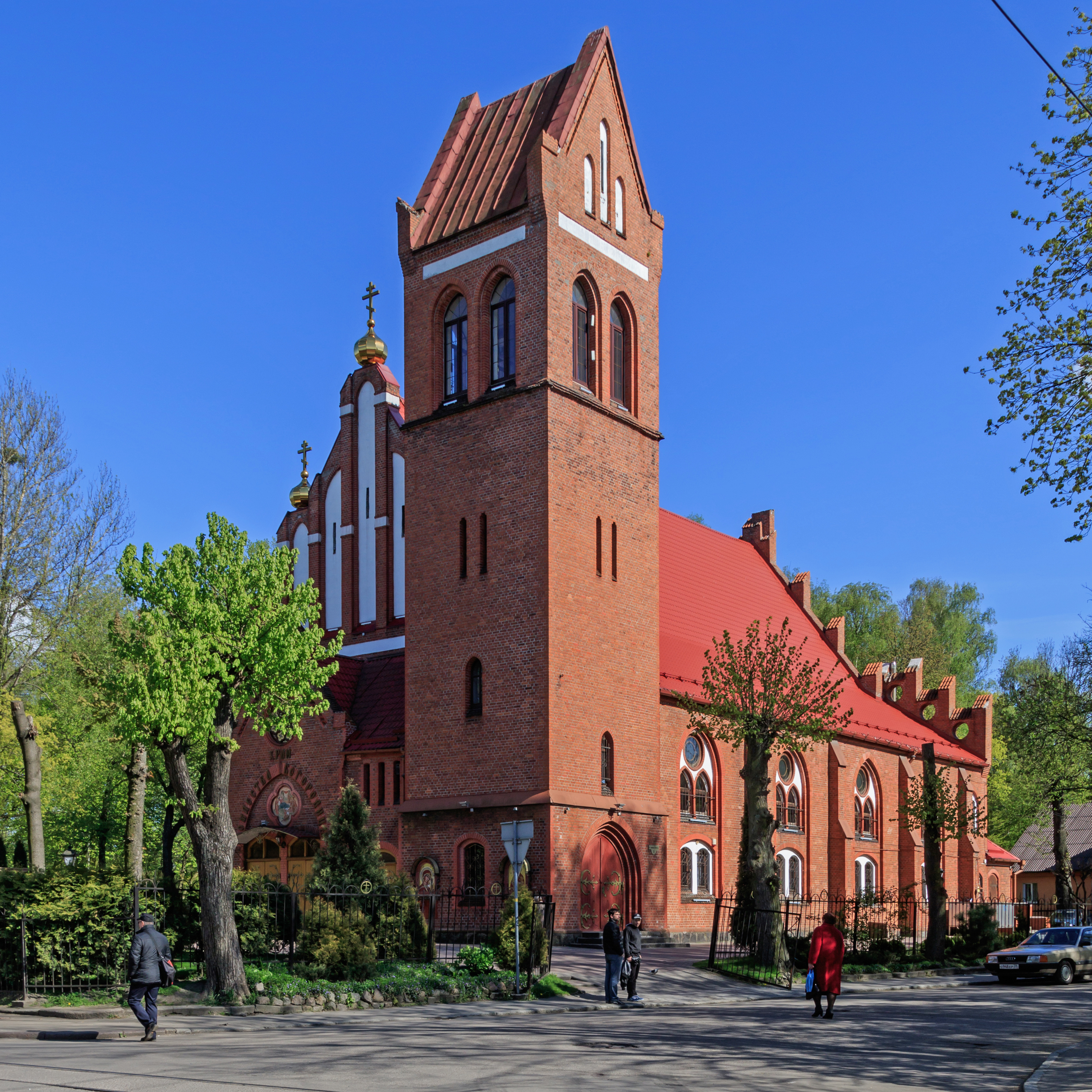
- Ponarth church
- 54°40′52″N 20°28′50″E
- Location: Ponarth, Kaliningrad, Russia
- Denomination: Russian Orthodox
- Previous denomination: Protestant

History
- Dedicated: 23.July 1897

Architecture
- Style: Neo-Gothic
- Completed: 1896

Ponarth Church (German: Ponarther Kirche) is a current Russian Orthodox and former Protestant church in the Ponarth quarter of Kaliningrad, Russia (formerly Königsberg, Germany). It was opened in 1879 as part of a German Protestant parish church. Following a period of use as a storehouse during the Soviet Union, it was later converted into a Russian Orthodox church.

== History ==
The brick Neo-Gothic church of Ponarth was built in May 1896 and dedicated on 23 July 1897; its construction was championed by the mayor, Robert Hoffmann, and the director of the brewery, Eduard Schifferdecker. It purchased an organ from Königsberg Synagogue the same year of opening. The Protestant congregation was separated from that of Haberberg in 1905 and became its own parish. Its pastors were Johannes Joachim, Leop. Beckmann, Gerh. Symnanowski, and Helmut Hildebrandt where they became part of the Confessing Church movement during Nazi Germany. Shortly before the start of the Second World War, Pastor Beckmann was placed on leave by the consistory.

The church was lightly damaged during World War II and was in continual use by the remaining Germans until their expulsion in 1947. Residents of Kaliningrad, Russia, used it first for storage and then as a gym. In the early 1980s the roof tiles were replaced with cement. Since 21 September 1992 it has been a Russian Orthodox church.

On July 8, 2024, patriarch Kirill of Moscow visited the church, he presented an icon of the prince Alexander Nevsky to the church in memory of his visit.

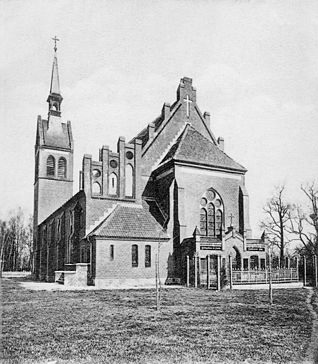
Ponarth Church

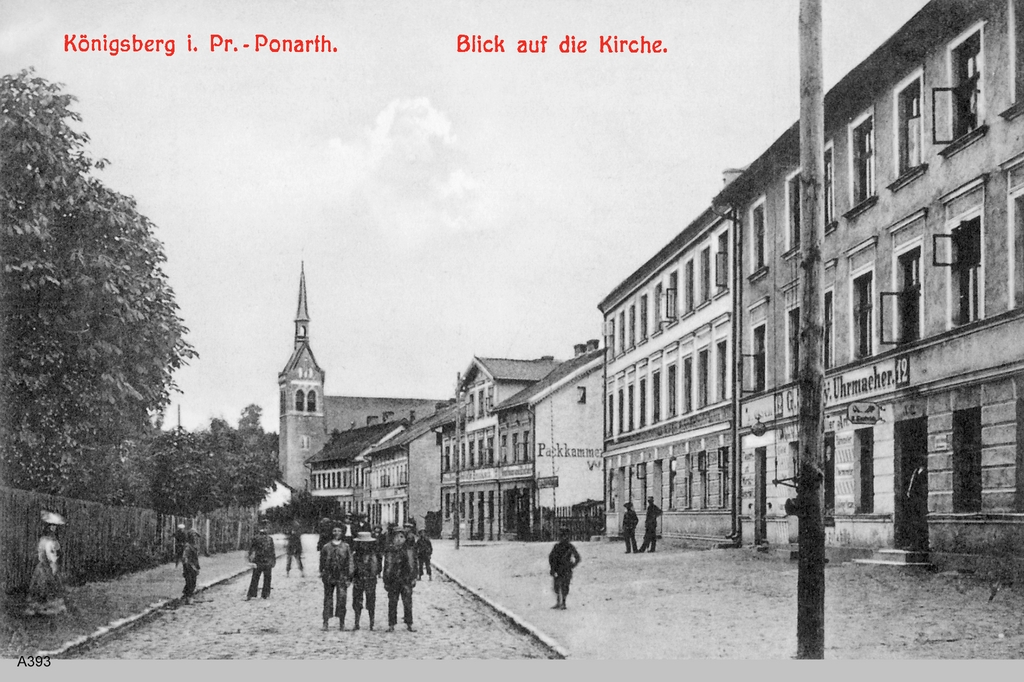
View of Ponarth and the church

== Bibliography ==
- Albinus, Robert (1985). Lexikon der Stadt Königsberg Pr. und Umgebung (in German). Leer: Verlag Gerhard Rautenberg. p. 371. ISBN 3-7921-0320-6.
- Mühlpfordt, Herbert Meinhard (1972). Königsberg von A bis Z (in German). München: Aufstieg-Verlag. p. 168. ISBN 3-7612-0092-7.
