= Schönbusch (Königsberg) =

Coordinates: 54.6819°N 20.4786°E

Schönbusch was a suburban estate (Gutsbezirk) of and then a quarter of Königsberg, Germany, located southwest of the city center. Its territory is now part of Dimitrovo within the Moskovsky District in Kaliningrad, Russia.

Schönbusch developed from an inn known first as Niederkrug and then as Duboisruh, after its owner, Dubois. King William I and Queen Augusta visited there on 14 October 1861 before his coronation in Königsberg. In 1865 it was known as Schönbusch and was part of the rural district of Königsberg (Landkreis Königsberg i. Pr.). Schönbusch was added to neighboring Ponarth on 14 October 1893; Ponarth was then merged into the city of Königsberg in 1905.

Schönbusch was most well known for its brewery, Aktien-Brauerei Schönbusch, founded in 1871. It acquired Brauerei Wickbold AG in 1923. The Amber Room was once believed to have been within the ruins of the Schönbusch brewery.
