= Brandenburg Gate (Kaliningrad) =

City gate in Kaliningrad, Russia

Coordinates: 54°41′50.22″N 20°29′41.11″E

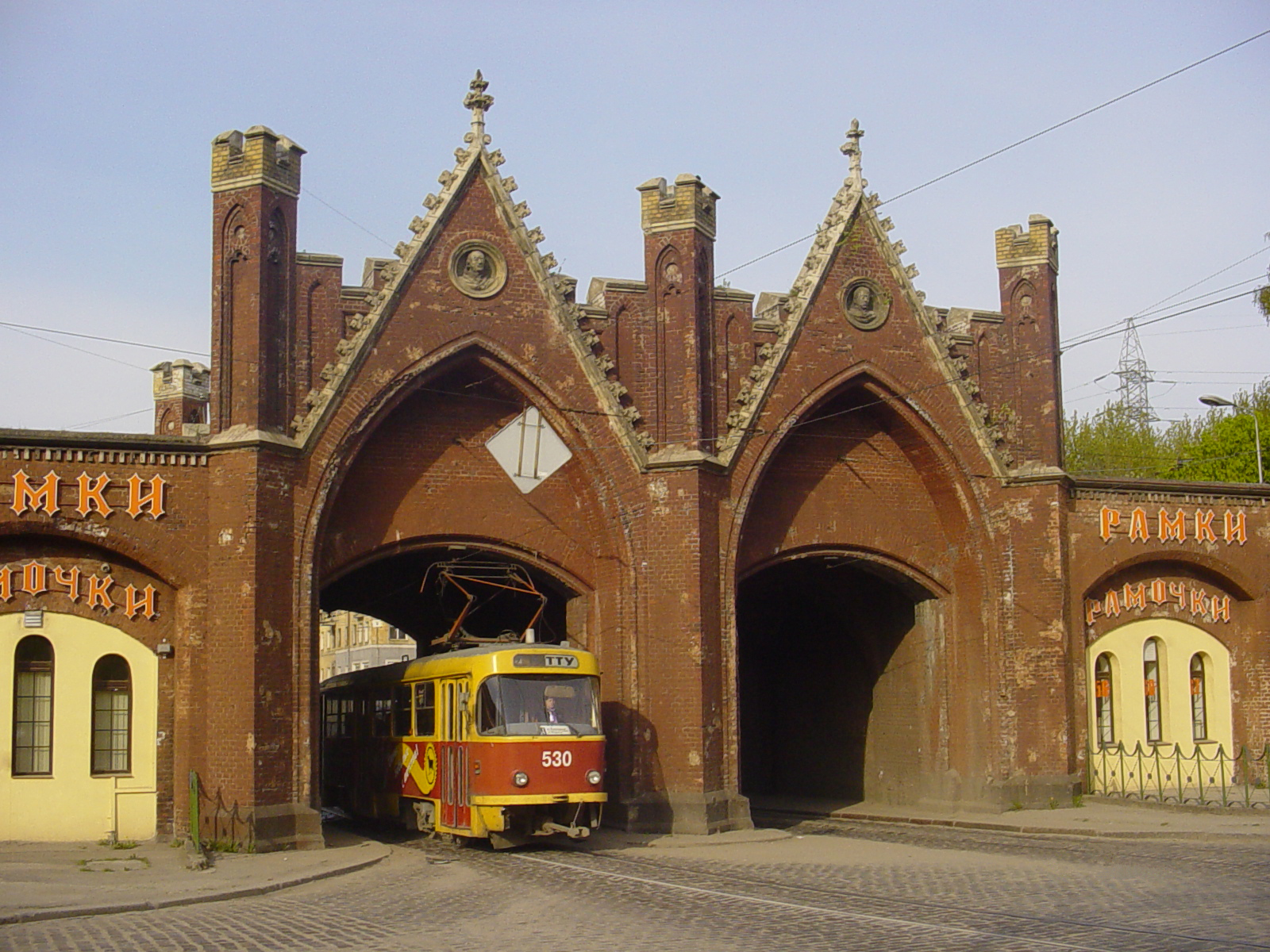
The Brandenburg Gate in Kaliningrad with a Tatra T4 tram in 2004.

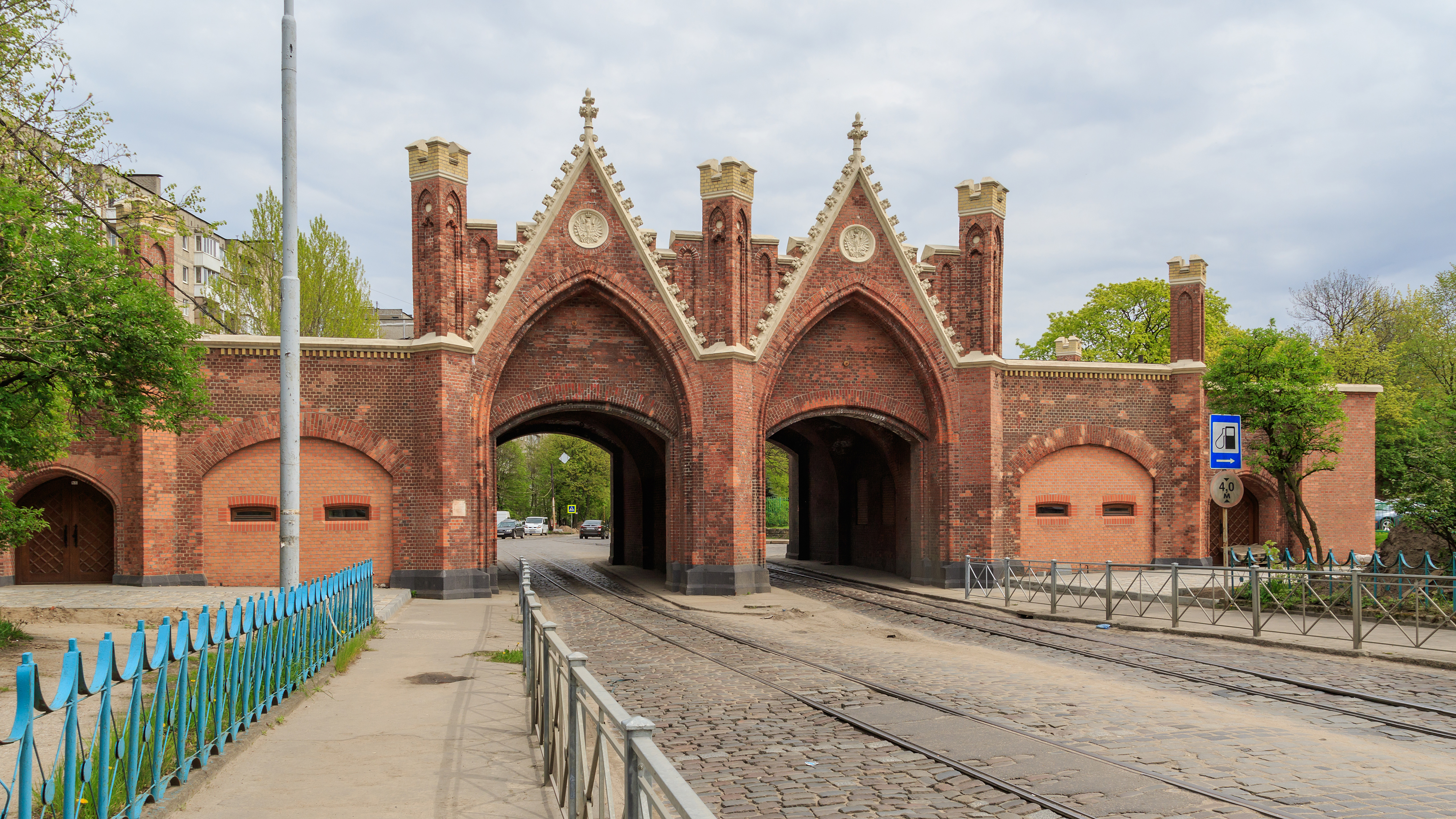
In 2017

The Brandenburg Gate (Russian: Бранденбургские ворота, tr.: Brandenburgskie vorota, German: Brandenburger Tor) is one of seven surviving city gates in Kaliningrad, the former German city of Königsberg. The gate is located on Bagration Street and is the only gate of Kaliningrad still in use for the intended purpose.

== History ==
The Brandenburg Gate was built in the south-western part of Königsberg in 1657, with the strengthening of the city walls at the intersection with the road leading to the castle of Brandenburg (now the village of Ushakovo). Due to lack of funds a mere wooden gate was erected. Some hundred years later the gate was torn down and replaced by a brick structure by order of King Frederick II of Prussia. During restoration work in 1843 the gate was significantly altered and decorated with sharp decorative pediments, cruciform sandstone color, stylized leaves on the tops, coats of arms and medallions. Sculptures of Field Marshal Hermann von Boyen (1771–1848), a war minister and reformer of the Prussian army, and Lieutenant-General Ernst von Aster (1778–1855), chief of the engineering corps, and one of the initiators of the second strengthening of the city walls, were added as well.

The Brandenburg Gate is the only gate of the still existing gates of Kaliningrad that performs its original transport function. The structure has been restored and is protected by the state as an architectural monument.

== Architecture ==
Though built in the middle of the 19th century, the Königsberg gates were neogothic in style. The Brandenburg Gate expresses the Gothic motifs particularly vividly. The pediments in the form of arrows give this gate, which is in fact rather low, a sense of height. The gate is richly decorated with decorative elements, such as the high relief stone and stylized flowers.

== See also ==
- Brandenburg Gate for the famous gate in Berlin;
- Brandenburg Gate (Potsdam) for the gate in Potsdam.
