= Moskovsky Administrative District, Kaliningrad =

Moskovsky Administrative District Моско́вский район (Russian)
- District
- Location of Moskovsky Administrative District on the map of Kaliningrad
- Coordinates: 54°41′50″N 20°31′0″E
- Country: Russia
- Federal subject: Kaliningrad Oblast
- Administrative center: Kaliningrad

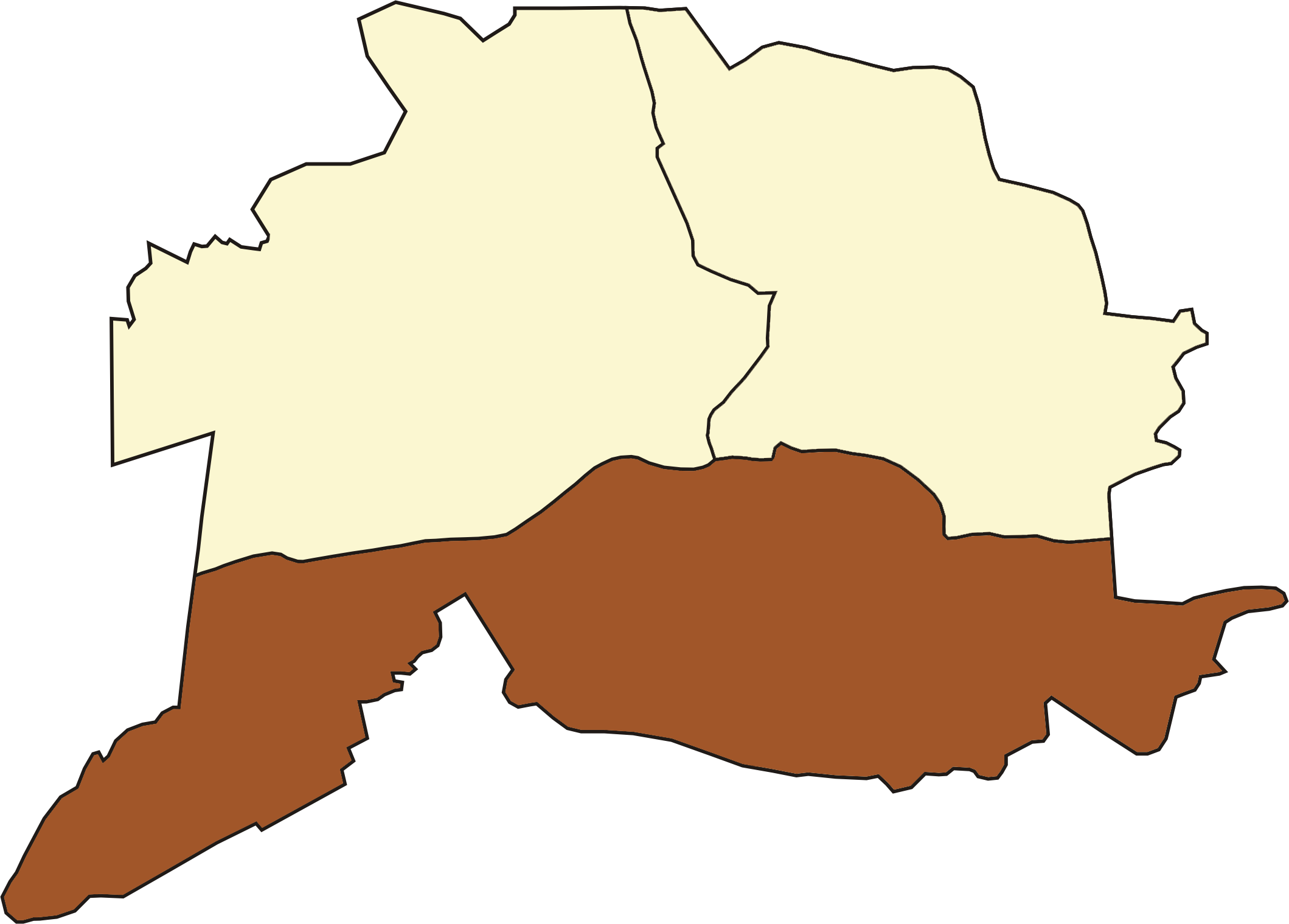
Moscovsky district of Kaliningrad on the map of Kaliningrad.

Moskovsky Administrative District (Russian: Моско́вский район) is a district (raion) of the city of Kaliningrad, Kaliningrad Oblast, Russia. Population: 152,165 (2010 census); 85,507 (2002 census); 67,472 (1989 Soviet census).
