= Königsberg Synagogue =

Orthodox synagogue in Kaliningrad, Russia

New Synagogue, Königsberg
- German: Neue Synagoge
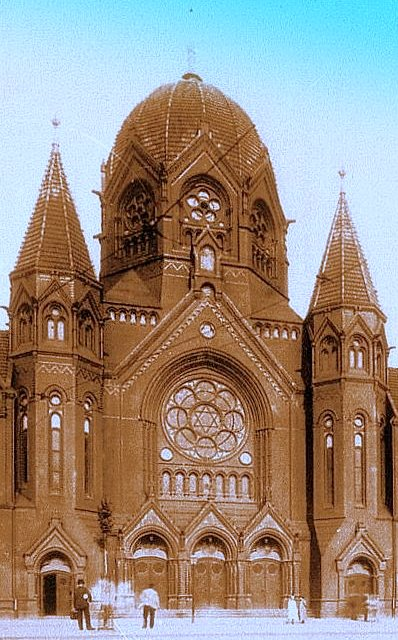
- The former synagoge in the 19th century

- Location of the former synagogue in Germany, as it was in 1937

Religion
- Affiliation: Orthodox Judaism (former)
- Rite: Nusach Ashkenaz
- Ecclesiastical or organizational status: Synagogue (1896–1938)
- Status: Destroyed

Location
- Location: Königsberg, East Prussia (modern Kaliningrad)
- Country: Germany (now Russia)
- Interactive map of New Synagogue, Königsberg
- Coordinates: 54°42′20″N 20°30′56″E

Architecture
- Architect: Cremer & Wolffenstein
- Type: Synagogue architecture
- Style: Aesopian; Romanesque Revival
- Established: 1722 (as a congregation)
- Completed: 1896
- Destroyed: November 1938 (during Kristallnacht)
- Dome: One

The Königsberg Synagogue, called at the time, the New Synagogue (German: Neue Synagoge), was a former Orthodox Jewish congregation and synagogue, located in Königsberg in Prussia, East Prussia, Germany (now Kaliningrad, Russia).

The New Synagogue was designed by Cremer & Wolffenstein in the Romanesque Revival style, Aesopian in its crafting, and completed in 1896 to replace the Old Synagogue. The New Synagogue was destroyed by the Nazis in the aftermath of Kristallnacht, that occurred during November 1938. Also destroyed was the Adass Jisroel synagogue.

In 2018 a completely new synagogue was opened on the site of the former destroyed synagogue, at 1a Oktyabr'skaya Street, Kaliningrad.

== History ==
In 1508 two Jewish physicians were allowed to settle in the city. 307 Jews lived at Königsberg in 1756. There were 1,027 Jews in Königsberg in 1817. In 1864 there lived 3,024 Jews. In 1880 there were 5,000 Jews at the city. In 1900 there were only 3,975 Jews in Königsberg. The first synagogue was a chapel built in 1680 in Burgfreiheit (a location which was a ducal Prussian immunity district around the castle, not administrated by the city).

In 1704 there was the formation of the Jewish congregation, when they acquired a Jewish cemetery and when they founded a "Chevra Kaddisha". In 1722 they received a constitution. In 1756 a new synagogue in Schnürlingsdamm street was dedicated but destroyed by the city fire in 1811. In 1815 a new synagogue was constructed on the same location, meanwhile called Synagogenstrasse #2. The second constitution of the Jewish congregation was issued in 1811.

Some Orthodox congregants seceded from the Jewish Congregation of Königsberg, which they deemed too liberal, and founded the Israelite Synagogal Congregation of «Adass Jisroel» (German: Israelitische Synagogengemeinde «Adass Jisroel»). (Note: In the Ashkenazzi pronunciation of Hebrew the words עדת ישראל become Adass Jisroel in German orthography, which was the official name in Latin letters. In English orthography Adas Yisro'el would better represent the Ashkenazzi pronunciation. In Sephardi Hebrew pronunciation, today prevailing, the words עדת ישראל become Adat Yisra'el in English.) In 1893 the Israelite Synagogal Congregation built its own synagogue in Synagogenstraße #14–15. Soon later the mainstream Jewish Congregation of Königsberg built a new and larger place of worship, therefore called New Synagogue, dedicated in August 1896 in Lomse. The synagogue in Synagogenstrasse #2 was called Old Synagogue since.

The New Synagogue, as well as the Old Synagogue, were destroyed in the November Pogrom in the night of November 9–10, 1938. The Adass Jisroel synagogue was terribly vandalised, but spared from arson, and could thus be restored to serve as Jewish place of worship. In July 1939 the Gestapo ordered the merger of the smaller Israelite Synagogal Congregation in the larger Jewish Congregation of Königsberg, which now had to enlist also all non-Jews such as Christians and irreligionists, whom the Nazis categorised as Jews because they had three or more Jewish grandparents. The systematic deportations of Jewish Germans (and Gentile Germans of Jewish descent), starting in October 1941, (Note: The deportations of Jews and Gentiles of Jewish descent from Austria and Pomerania (both to Poland) as well as Baden and the Palatinate (both to France) had remained a spontaneous episode.) brought the congregational life in Königsberg to a halt by November 1942.

== Replacement synagogue ==
In October 2011 the foundation cornerstone of the new synagogue was erected in the same place, where a modified replica of the building destroyed in 1938 was planned. The plaque attached to the cornerstone reportedly was damaged and sprayed with neo-Nazi symbols, but later was cleaned and repaired. The synagogue was reopened in 2018 on the 80th anniversary of its destruction.

== Clergy ==
The following individuals have served as rabbi of the congregation:

Ordinal	Name	Term started	Term ended	Time in office	Notes
1	Solomon Fürst	1707	1722	14–15 years	Wrote a cabbalistic work and a prayer, which is printed in Hebrew and German language
2	Aryeh (Löb) Epstein ben Mordecai	1745	1775	29–30 years	
3	Samuel Wigdor	1777	1784	6–7 years	
4	Shimshon ben Mordechai	1707	1722	14–15 years	
5	Joshua Bär Herzfeld	1800	1814	13–14 years	
6	Joseph Levin Saalschütz	1814	1823	8–9 years	
7	Wolff Laseron	1824	1828	3–4 years	
8	Jacob Hirsch Mecklenburg	1831	1865	33–34 years	Wrote the "Ha-Ketav we-ha-Qabbalah"
9	Isaac Bamberger				
10	Hermann Vogelstein	1897			

== Notable members ==
Jews of Königsberg have taken an important part in the struggle for the Jewish emancipation.

- Hannah Arendt (1906–1975), political theorist
- Yaakov Ben-Tor (1910–2002), geologist
- Hugo Falkenheim (4 September 1856 – 22 September 1945), last Chairman of the Jewish congregation of Königsberg
- Ferdinand Falkson (physician)
- David Friedländer (1750–1834), writer
- Leah Goldberg (1911–1970), author
- Theodor Goldstücker (1821–1872), scholar
- Marcus Herz (pupil of Kant)
- Immanuel Jacobovits, (1921–1999), Chief Rabbi of the United Hebrew Congregations of the Commonwealth
- Johann Jacoby (politician)
- Rudolf Lipschitz (1832–1903), mathematician
- Moshe Meron (1926–2023), politician
- Leah Rabin (1928–2000)
- Moshe Smoira (1888–1961), first President of the Supreme Court of Israel
- Michael Wieck (1928-2021), violinist and author

In 1942 most of the remaining Jews of Königsberg were murdered in Maly Trostinez (Minsk), Theresienstadt and Auschwitz.

== Gallery ==
=== Destroyed synagogue ===
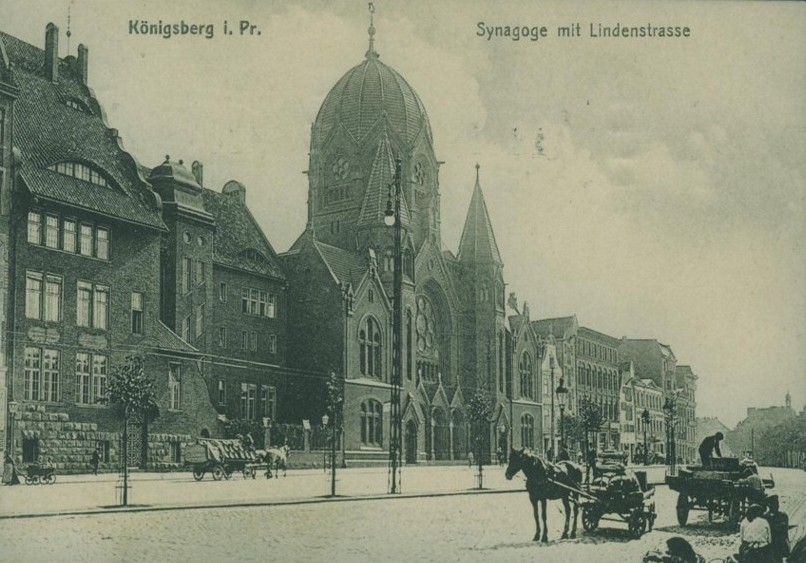
A postcard image of the former synagogue with Lindenstraße (today's ulitsa Oktyabrskaia)

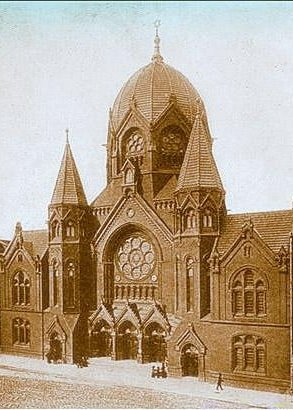
The former synagogue, 1900

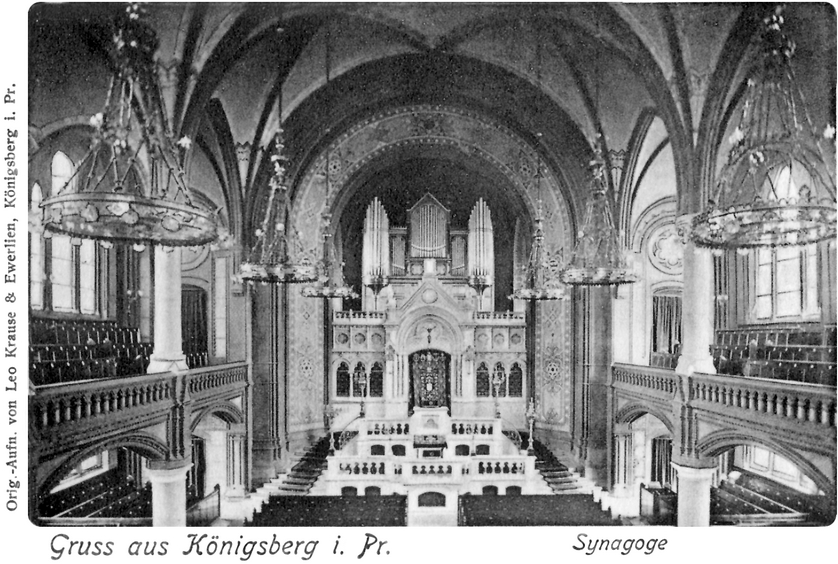
The interior of the former synagogue, undated

=== Replacement synagogue ===
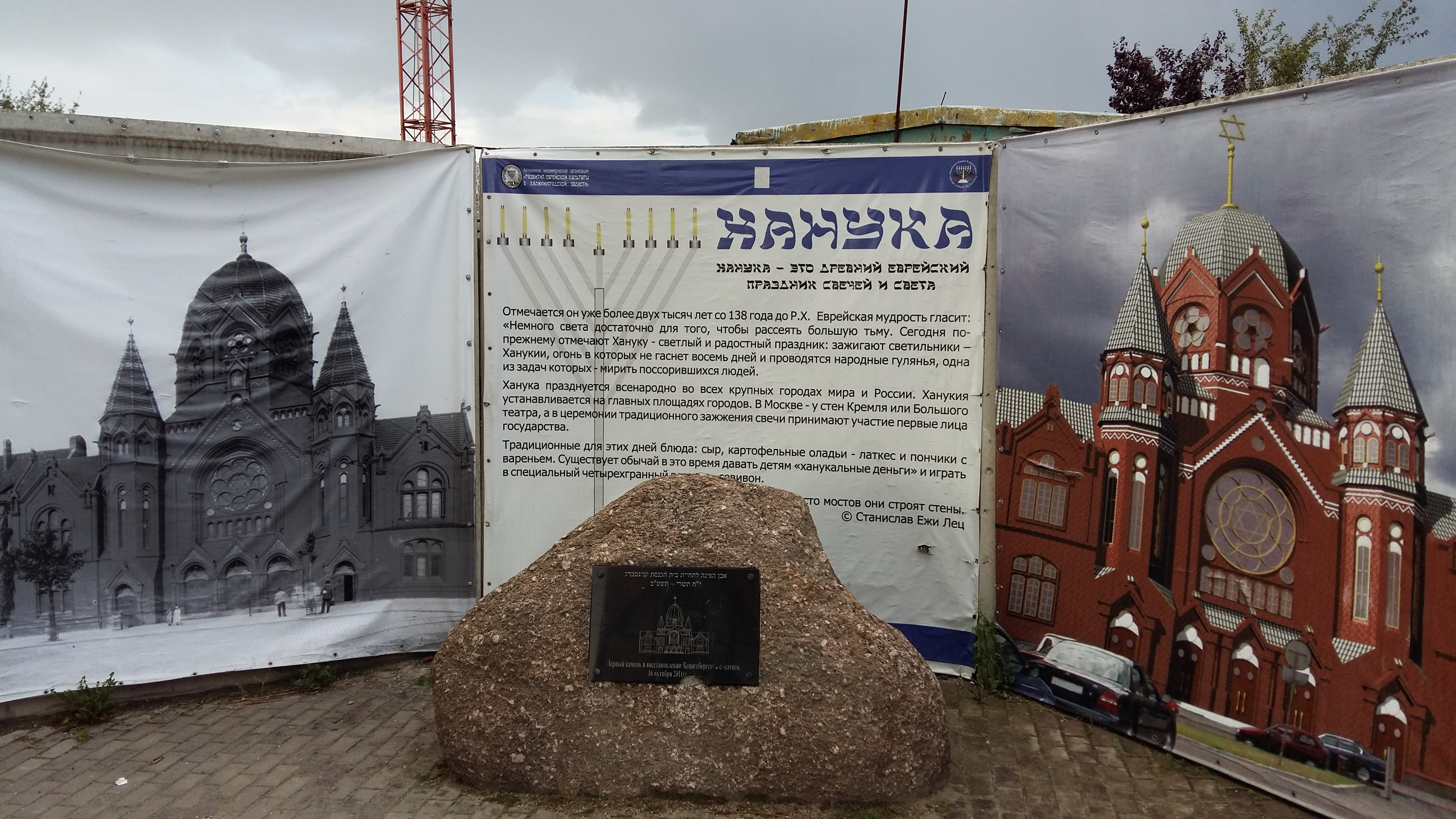
Foundation stone and re-construction site

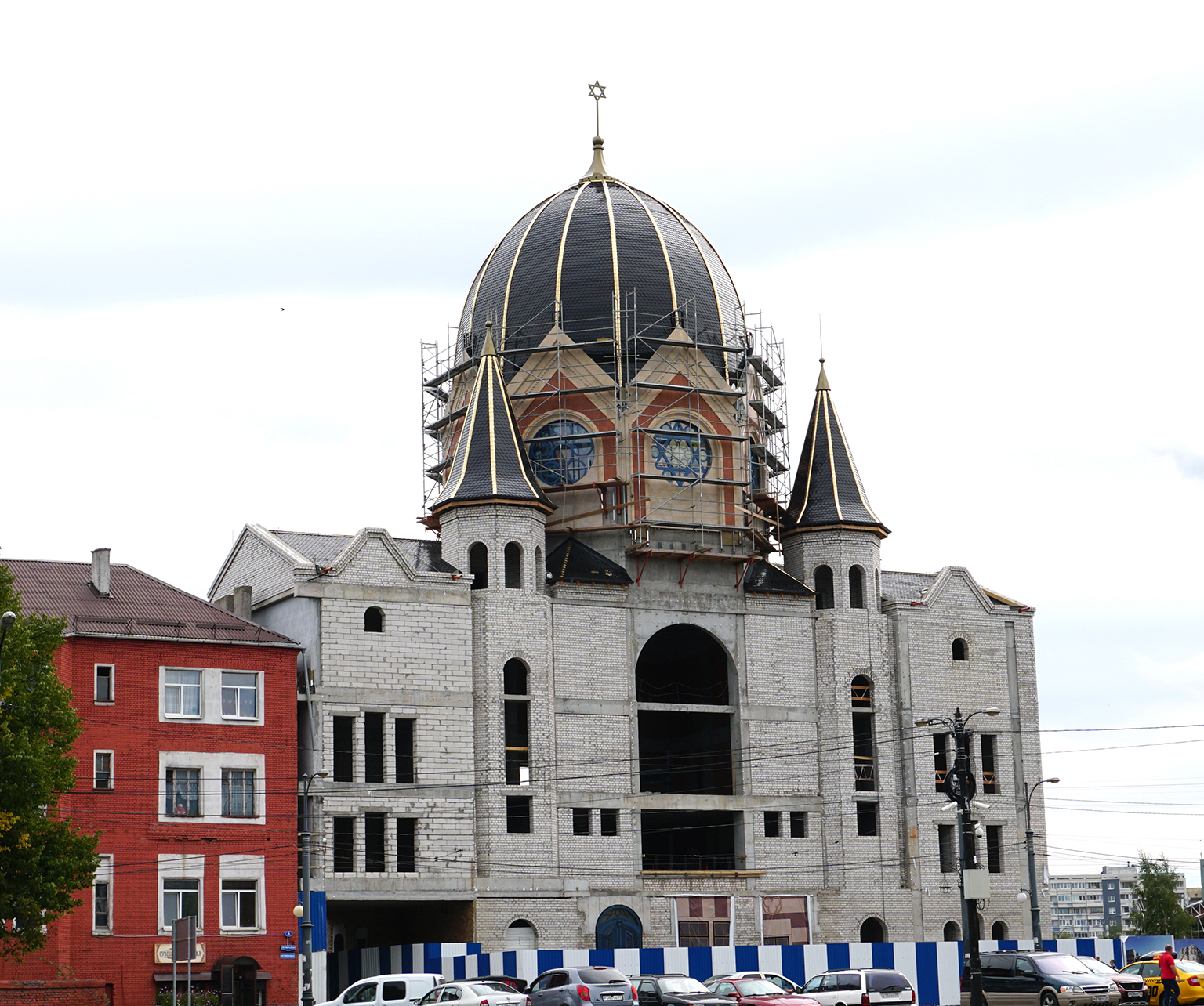
Rebuilding of synagogue, August 2018

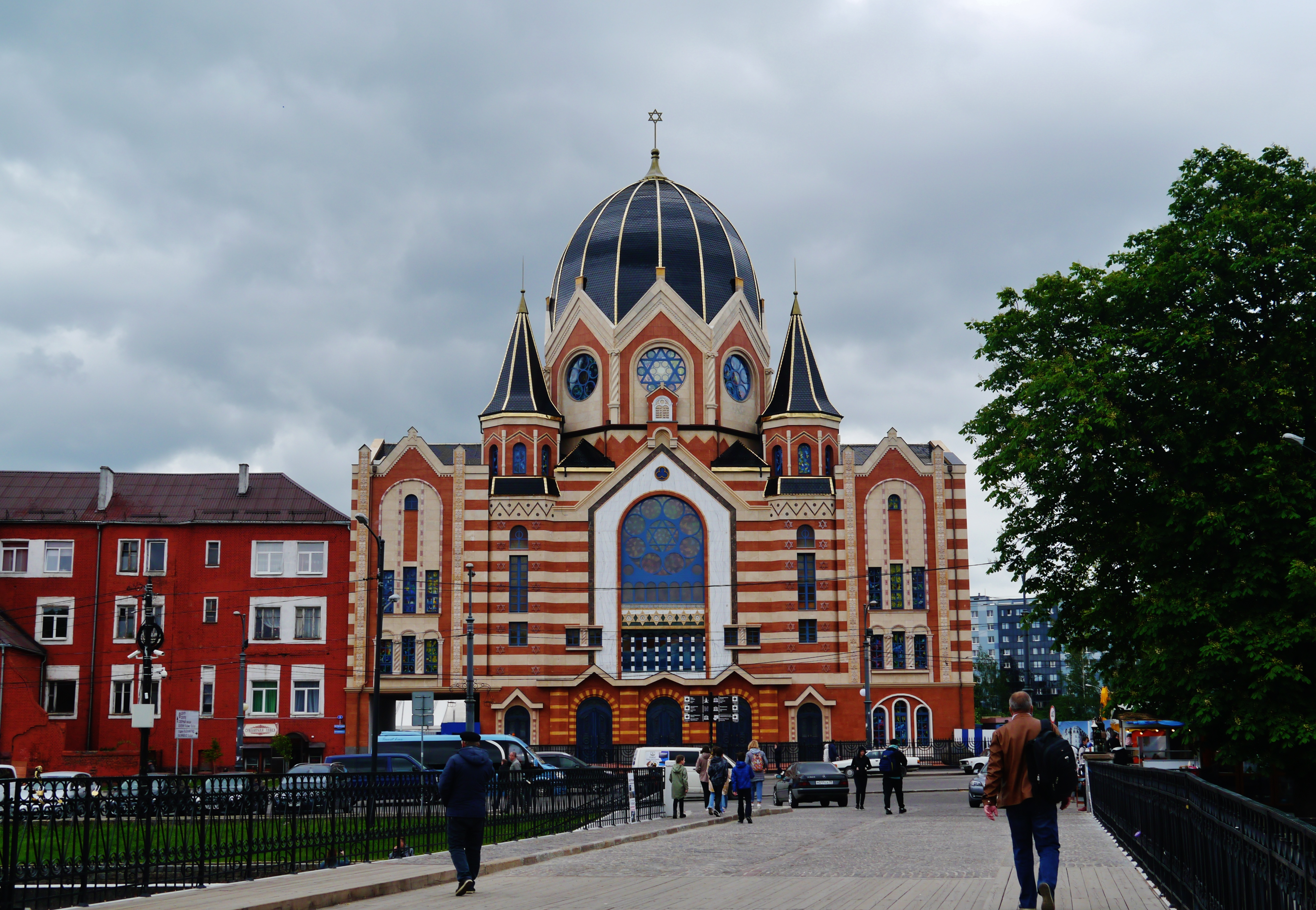
The rebuilt synagogue, 2019

== See also ==
- History of Jews in Königsberg
- List of synagogues in Germany (in German)
- List of synagogues in Russia
