= History of the Jews in Königsberg =

The history of the Jews in Königsberg reaches back to the 1530s. By the 20th century Königsberg had one of the larger Jewish communities within the German Reich. The city's Jewish community was eliminated by emigration and then The Holocaust during World War II.

== Early history ==
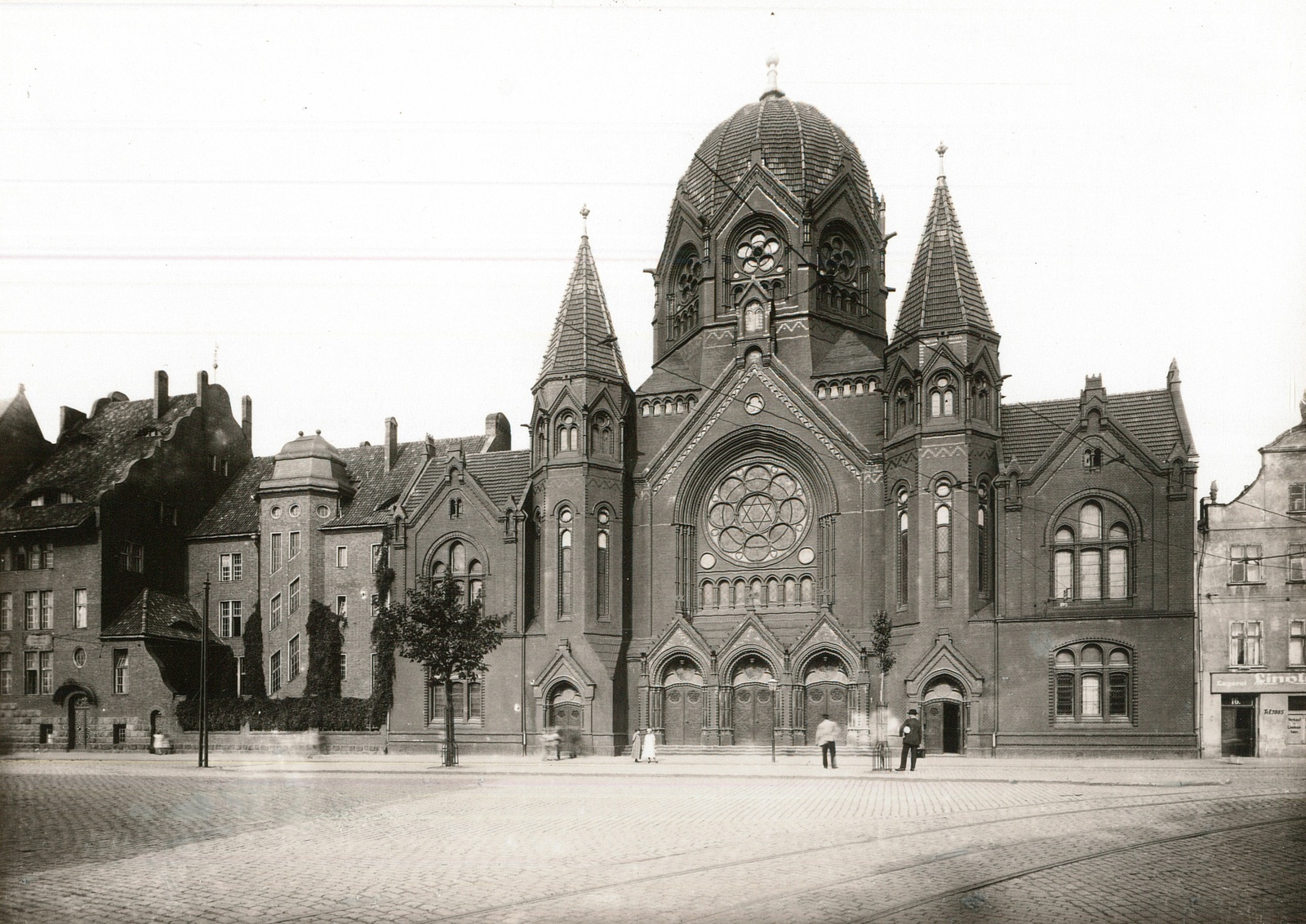
Early 20th-century view of the New Synagogue

The first Jews in Königsberg, then capital of Ducal Prussia, a vassal duchy of the Kingdom of Poland (now Kaliningrad, Russia), were the doctors Isaak May (1538) and Michel Abraham (1541) at the court of Albert, Duke of Prussia. In 1680 or 1682 Frederick William, the Great Elector, allowed the city's Jewish residents to rent space for prayer at the Eulenburgsches Haus (later Hotel Deutsches Haus) on Burgfreiheit's Kehrwiederstraße (later Theaterstraße). Most were merchants from the Polish–Lithuanian Commonwealth.

A permanent Jewish community began to develop in Königsberg only by 1704, when a Jewish cemetery was designated. Jewish students were first admitted to the University of Königsberg in 1712.

In 1750 Frederick II of Prussia issued an edict which classified Jews in Prussia into several categories. The main division was between so-called "tolerated Jews" (geduldete Juden) who could remain in Prussia, and "not tolerated Jews" who were required to leave upon reaching adulthood, as well as "protected Jews" (Schutz-Juden) . The "protected Jews", whose number was initially limited to a total of 203 families in all of Brandenburg-Prussia, were allowed to reside in a city but had no right of mobility. Non-protected "tolerated Jews", who comprised the vast majority of Jewish inhabitants of the Prussian kingdom, were not allowed to permanently settle in Prussia, were not allowed to purchase land or houses or to engage in any commercial or economic activity, and generally were not allowed to live in the cities unless they served as employees or clients of the "protected Jews". As a result, the Jewish population of Königsberg in the 18th century was fairly low, although this changed as the restrictions became relaxed over the course of the 19th century. In 1753 Frederick II allowed the city's Jews to build a Hasidic synagogue on Vordere Vorstadt's Schnürlingsdamm, which was completed in 1756. Georg David Kypke served as its government inspector. In 1756 there were 29 families of "protected Jews" in Königsberg, which increased to 57 by 1789. The total number of Jewish inhabitants was less than 500 in the middle of the 18th century, and around 800 by the end of it, out of a total population of almost 60,000 people.

== 19th and early 20th century ==
The city counted 300 Jewish residents in 1756, 900 residents in 1800, and 1,027 in 1817, with much of the increase coming from the Russian Empire. Although the first synagogue, the Alte Synagoge, burned down in 1811, it was rebuilt on nearby Synagogenstraße and dedicated in 1815. Jewish emancipation occurred in 1812 during the Prussian reforms, but Jews were largely restricted from officer and government professions. Full emancipation only occurred in 1869 through the North German Confederation.

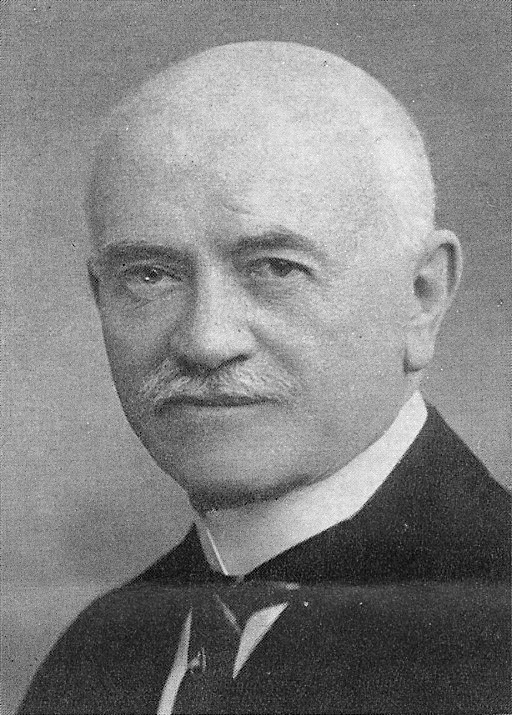
Hugo Falkenheim, leader of Königsberg's Jews during World War II

Königsberg's Jewish community flourished during the 19th century and early 20th century, peaking with a population of 5,000 by 1880. The first history of the city's Jews was written by Heymann Jolowicz in 1867. In 1893 the Adass Jisroel, an Orthodox branch, opened their own synagoge on Synagogenstraße near the Alte Synagoge. The Orthodox numbered only 25-30 families, but included influential bankers, merchants, and jewelers. The liberal Neue Synagoge (new synagogue) was built along Lindenstraße in Lomse from 1894 to 1896 to serve the majority of the Jewish population. A third group included the city's Polish and Lithuanian Jews. The number of Russian Jews increased in the late 19th century due to anti-Jewish pogroms in the Russian Empire. Königsberg's Jewish citizens were divided between Zionists and the Centralverein deutscher Staatsbürger jüdischen Glaubens.

Many of Königsberg's Jews served during World War I. By 1917 there were 820 Königsberg Jews in the Prussian Army, including 80 volunteers. They included 15 recipients of the Iron Cross First Class and 102 recipients of the Iron Cross Second Class.

== Interbellum and World War II ==
Due to anti-Semitism and persecution in the 1920s and 1930s, Königsberg's Jewish population was in decline by the time of the Nazi Party took control through the Machtergreifung in 1933. In that year there were only 3,500 Jews living in the city. Anti-Jewish legislation in prewar Nazi Germany, enforced by Erich Koch, restricted business and led many Königsberg Jews to emigrate, mostly to the United States and Great Britain. Michael Wieck wrote of the discrimination he suffered from the Hitler Youth. At the opening of the 1935 Ostmesse, Hjalmar Schacht criticized the persecution to no avail. Persecution led the Jewish community to create a separate Jewish school for 82 students in April 1935; it grew to encompass 180 students in 6 classes with 4 teachers by October 1935. In February 1938 the propaganda paper Der Student der Ostmark published the names of 201 Jewish business, 38 doctors, and 22 lawyers remaining in the city, which was used by the Sturmabteilung during the Night of Broken Glass in November 1938. The New Synagogue was burned down, the Orthodox Adass Jisroel synagogue and two cemeteries were vandalized; the Jewish school was attacked, as was the Orthodox synagogue. However, both reopened afterwards. (As late as mid-1941, Michael Wieck became Bar Mitzva at the synagogue.)

There were only 1,585 Jews in the city in May 1939, after which emigration was prohibited. Prominent Königsberg Jews who committed suicide during World War II were the esteemed councilor Paul Stettiner, consul Felix Japha and his wife, and the doctor Lotte Gottschalk. Her uncle, politician Alfred Gottschalk, starved to death in 1942. The leader of the Jewish community, Hugo Falkenheim, was smuggled to safety.

Many of the Jewish residents who remained in 1942 were transported to Nazi concentration camps. These camps included Theresienstadt in occupied Czechoslovakia, Kaiserwald in occupied Latvia, and camps in Minsk in occupied Byelorussian Soviet Socialist Republic. The lawyer Max Lichtenstein was murdered at Theresienstadt, while the councilor Martha Harpf was murdered at Auschwitz. In addition, a subcamp of the Stutthof concentration camp was operated in the city in 1944–1945, in which around 500 Jews were enslaved as forced labour. Only a small number of Königsberg's Jews survived The Holocaust and World War II; the number of victims is unknown. Many remaining German Jews left Königsberg, then Kaliningrad, in April 1948.

Today, a community of approximately 2000 Jews remains in the region, with the New Synagogue having been rebuilt in 2018 in the same location, and as an exact replica of the building destroyed in 1938.

== Notable personalities ==
List of prominent personalities from Königsberg's Jewish community (including converts to Christianity)

- Moritz Becker (1830-1901), amber entrepreneur
- Yaakov Ben-Tor (1910-2002), geologist
- Eduard Birnbaum (1855–1920), cantor
- Josef Hirsch Dunner (1913-2007), Chief Rabbi of East Prussia
- Isaac Abraham Euchel (1756-1804), Hebraist
- Hugo Falkenheim (1856-1945), physician and academic
- Ferdinand Falkson (1820-1900), physician and writer
- Ludwig Friedländer (1824-1909), philologist
- Max Fürst (1905-1978), writer
- Markus Herz (1747-1803), physician
- Carl Gustav Jacob Jacobi (1804-1851), mathematician
- Johann Jacoby (1805–77), politician
- Leopold Jessner (1878-1945), producer and director
- Fanny Lewald (1811–89), author
- Ludwig Lichtheim (1845-1928), physician and academic
- Friedrich Litten (1873-1940), jurist and academic
- Abraham Mapu (1808-1867), Hebraist
- Hermann Minkowski (1864-1909), mathematician
- Arno Motulsky (1923–2018), human geneticist
- Walter Simon (1857-1920), banker and philanthropist
- Eduard von Simson (1810–99), jurist and politician
- Moshe Smoira (1888-1961), jurist
- Michael Wieck (born 1928), violinist
