= Harpf =

Harpf is a surname. Notable people with the surname include:

- Georg Harpf (born 2005), German shot putter
- Martha Harpf (1874–1942), German politician

== See also ==
- Harp
- Harf (disambiguation)
