= Falkson =

Falkson is a surname. Notable people with the surname include:

- Ferdinand Falkson (1820–1900), German physician and writer
- Rodney Falkson (1941–2019), South African cricketer
