= Salomon Maimon =

Lithuanian Jewish philosopher (1753–1800)

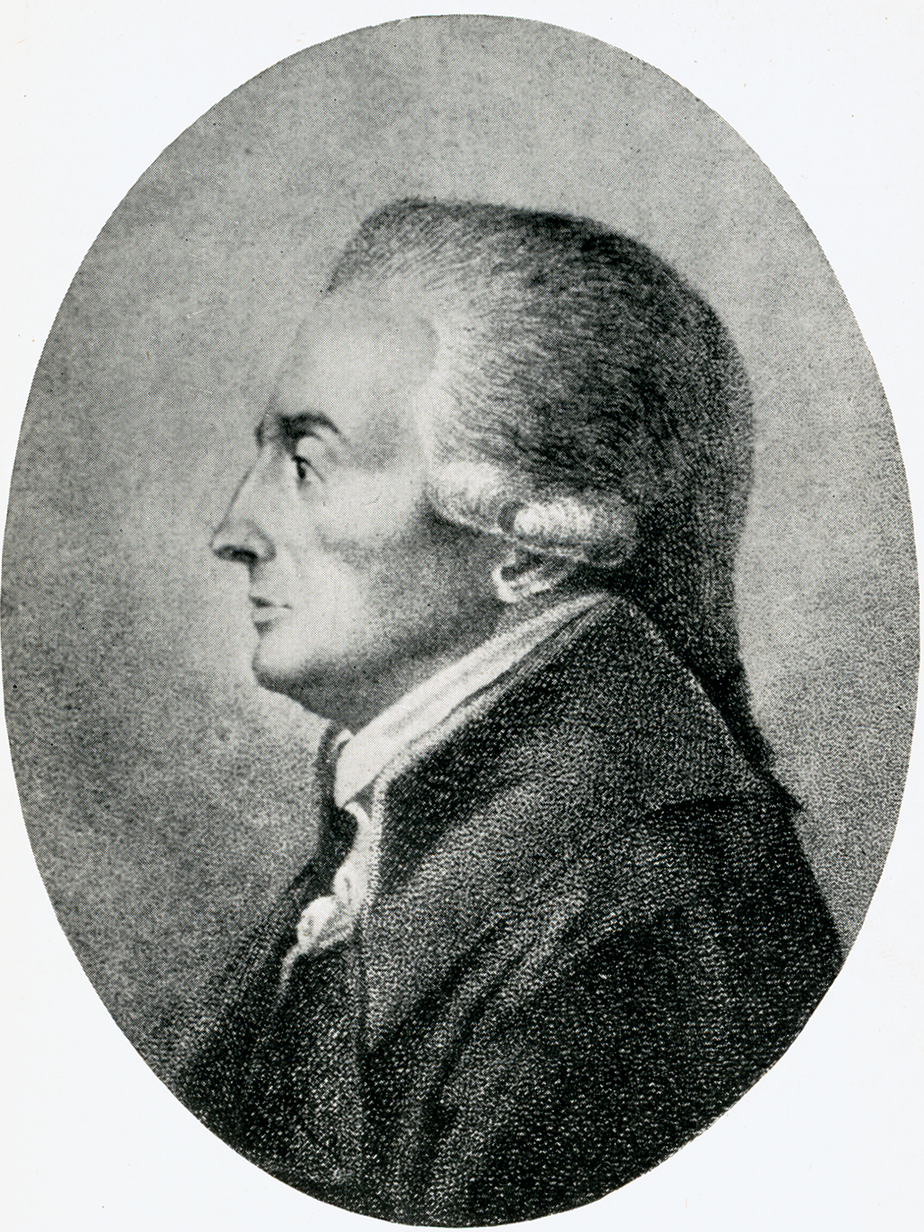
- Born: Shlomo ben Joshua; 1753; Zhukov Borok near Mir, Grand Duchy of Lithuania, Polish–Lithuanian Commonwealth
- Died: 22 November 1800 (aged 46–47); Siegersdorf near Freystadt in Schlesien, Prussian Silesia, Kingdom of Prussia
- Other names: Solomon Maimon; Salomonas Maimonas

Education
- Education: Gymnasium Christianeum

Philosophical work
- Era: 18th-century philosophy
- Region: Western philosophy
- School: German idealism German skepticism Jewish Enlightenment
- Main interests: Epistemology, metaphysics, ethics
- Notable works: Essay on Transcendental Philosophy (1789/90)
- Notable ideas: Critique of Kant's quid juris and quid facti, the doctrine of differentials (die Lehre vom Differential), the principle of determinability (der Satz der Bestimmbarkeit)

Salomon Maimon (/ˈmaɪmɒn/; German: [ˈmaɪmoːn]; Lithuanian: Salomonas Maimonas; Hebrew: שלמה בן יהושע מימון Shlomo ben Yehoshua Maimon; 1753 – 22 November 1800) was a philosopher born of Lithuanian Jewish parentage in the Grand Duchy of Lithuania, present-day Belarus. His work was written in German and in Hebrew.

== Biography ==
=== Early years ===
Salomon Maimon was born Shlomo ben Joshua in the town of Zhukov Borok near Mir in the Grand Duchy of Lithuania (present-day Belarus), where his grandfather leased an estate from a Prince Karol Stanisław "Panie Kochanku" Radziwiłł. He was taught Torah and Talmud, first by his father, and later by instructors in Mir. He was recognized as a prodigy in Talmudic studies. His parents fell on hard times, and betrothed him to two separate girls in order to take advantage of their dowries, leading to a bitter rivalry. At the age of eleven he was married to one of the two prospects, a girl from Nesvizh. At the age 14 he was already a father and was making money by teaching Talmud. Later he learned some German from books and walked all the way to Slonim, where he met a rabbi named Shimshon ben Mordechai of Slonim who had studied in Germany. He borrowed German books on physics, optics and medicine from him. After that he became determined to study further.

=== Interest in Kabbalah ===
Maimon describes how he took an interest in Kabbalah, and made a pilgrimage to the court of the Maggid of Mezritch around 1770. He ridiculed the Maggid's adherents for their enthusiasm, and charged the Maggid with manipulating his followers. He also wrote that the Maggid's ideas are "closer to correct ideas of religion and morals" than those he was taught in cheder."

Around the years 1777–1778 he wrote the book Ma'ase Livnat ha-Sapir (meaning "a pavement of sapphire stone", from Exodus 24:10), in there he interpreted the Kabbala thought in philosophical way. This book went unprinted in Maimon's life and only in 2019 the scholar Gideon Freudenthal published it from the manuscript.

=== In Germany ===
In his mid-twenties Maimon left his home area in the direction of the German-speaking lands. His first attempt to take up residence in Berlin in 1778 failed. He was expelled for possession of a draft of a commentary on the Moreh Nebukhim of Maimonides. A later attempt to convert to Protestantism in Hamburg failed due to admitted lack of belief in Christian dogma. His second attempt to settle in Berlin in 1780 succeeded; he established a close connection with Moses Mendelssohn and entered the circles of the Haskalah (the Jewish Enlightenment movement) in Berlin. Mendelssohn introduced him to some wealthy Jews in Berlin, upon whom Maimon relied for patronage while he pursued his studies. He devoted himself to the study of philosophy along the lines of Leibniz, Wolff and Mendelssohn.

In 1783, Mendelssohn asked Maimon to leave Berlin due to Maimon's open Spinozism. After a journey to Hamburg, Amsterdam and then back to Hamburg, he started attending the Gymnasium Christianeum in Altona. During his stay there he improved his knowledge of the natural sciences and his command of German. In 1785, Maimon left for Berlin (where he met Mendelssohn for the last time), then moved to Dessau, and then settled in Breslau, where he attempted to study medicine but eventually took up the position of a tutor.

After many years of separation, Maimon's wife, Sarah, accompanied by their eldest son, David, managed to locate him in Breslau. She demanded that he either return to their home in Lithuania or give her a divorce. Maimon eventually agreed to the divorce.

It was not until 1787 in Berlin that Maimon became acquainted with Kantian philosophy, and in 1790 he published the Essay on Transcendental Philosophy (Versuch über die Transcendentalphilosophie, appeared at the end of 1789, dated in advance 1790), in which he formulated his objections to Kant's system. Kant seems to have considered Maimon one of his most astute critics. Maimon published a commentary on the Moreh Nebuchim [מורה נבוכים] of Maimonides in 1791 (Gibeath Hamore [גבעת המורה], The Hill of the Guide). In 1792/3 he published his Autobiography (Lebensgeschichte).

=== In Silesia ===
In 1795, Maimon found a peaceful residence in the house of Count von Kalckreuth (1766–1830), a young Silesian nobleman, and moved to the latter's estate in Siegersdorf near Freystadt in Schlesien in Prussian Silesia. Maimon died there at the age of 48 from apparent alcoholism. He was buried in Głogów, and because he was considered a Heretic by the city's Jewish community, they buried him next to the latrine of the graveyard, did not place a tombstone on his grave, and burned some of his writings.

== Thought ==
=== Thing-in-itself ===
He seizes upon the fundamental incompatibility of a consciousness that can apprehend, and yet is separated from, the thing-in-itself. That which is object of thought cannot be outside consciousness; just as in mathematics "–1" is an unreal quantity, so things-in-themselves are ex hypothesi outside consciousness, i.e. are unthinkable. The Kantian paradox he explains as the result of an attempt to explain the origin of the given in consciousness. The form of things is admittedly subjective; the mind endeavours to explain the material of the given in the same terms, an attempt which is not only impossible but involves a denial of the elementary laws of thought. Knowledge of the given is, therefore, essentially incomplete. Complete or perfect knowledge is confined to the domain of pure thought, to logic and mathematics. Thus the problem of the thing-in-itself is dismissed from the inquiry, and philosophy is limited to the sphere of pure thought.

=== Application of the categories ===
The Kantian categories are demonstrable and true, but their application to the given is meaningless and unthinkable. By this critical scepticism Maimon takes up a position intermediate between Kant and Hume. Hume's attitude to the empirical is entirely supported by Maimon. The causal concept, as given by experience, expresses not a necessary objective order of things, but an ordered scheme of perception; it is subjective and cannot be postulated as a concrete law apart from consciousness.

=== Doctrine of differentials ===
Whereas Kant posed a dualism between understanding and sensibility, or between concepts and the given, Maimon refers both these faculties back to a single source of cognition. Sensibility, in Maimon's view, is therefore not completely without conceptual content, but is generated according to rules that Maimon calls differentials. In calling them this, Maimon is referring to the differentials from the calculus, which are entities that despite being neither qualitative nor quantitative, can nevertheless give rise to a determinate quantity and quality when related to other differentials. The operations of the faculty of sensibility are for Maimon therefore not principally different from those of mathematical intuition: seeing the color red is the same procedure as drawing a geometrical figure such as a line in a circle in thought. The reason that qualities are nevertheless 'given' is that it is only an infinite understanding that can grasp the rules for the generation of qualities in the way that a human understanding can grasp the rules for drawing a circle.

=== Kant's comments ===
Kant had received the first chapter of Maimon's book in manuscript from Markus Herz. In a letter to Herz from 26 May 1789, Kant writes the following:

"I had half decided to send the manuscript back in its immediately .... But one glance at the work made me realize its excellence and that not only had none of my critics understood me and the main questions as well as Herr Maimon does but also very few men possess so much acumen for such deep investigations as he..."

Nevertheless, Kant does not agree with Maimon's assessment. For Kant, the question of the relationship of the faculties is adequately answered by the Transcendental Deduction, in which Kant argues that the categories make experience possible. Furthermore, as an explanation of the harmony of the faculties, Kant offers the Leibnizian account of a pre-established harmony.

== Bibliography ==
=== Collected works in German ===
- Maimon, Salomon. Gesammelte Werke, edited by Valerio Verra, 7 volumes, Hildsheim: Olms, 1965–1976.

=== English translations ===
- Maimon, Salomon. The Autobiography of Salomon Maimon with an Essay on Maimon's Philosophy, Introduction by Michael Shapiro, Translated by J. Clark Murray, Urbana: University of Illinois Press, 2001 (original edition: London, Boston : A. Gardner, 1888).
- Solomon Maimon’s Autobiography, translated by Paul Reitter. Edited and introduced by Yitzhak Y. Melamed and Abraham P. Socher (Princeton: Princeton University Press, 2019). [This is the first complete English translation of Maimon's autobiography].
- Maimon, Salomon. Essay on transcendental philosophy. Translated by Nick Midgley, Henry Somers-Hall, Alistair Welchman, and Merten Reglitz, London, New York: Continuum International Publishing Group, 2010, ISBN 978-1-4411-1384-9.
- Maimon, Salomon. Essay Towards a New Logic or Theory of Thought, Together Letters of Philaletes to Aenesidemus in: G. di Giovanni, H.S. Harris (eds.), Between Kant and Hegel: Texts in the Development of Post-Kantian Idealism, Indianapolis, IN: Hackett, 2001, pp. 158–203.
- Maimon, Salomon. Essay on Transcendental Philosophy. A Short Overview of the Whole Work, translated by H. Somers-Hall and M. Reglitz, in Pli: The Warwick Journal of Philosophy 19 (2008), pp. 127–165.
- Maimon, Salomon. The Philosophical Language-Confusion in: Jere Paul Surber, Metacritique. The Linguistic Assault on German Idealism, Amherst:Humanity Books, 2001, pp. 71–84
- Maimon’s Essay on a New Logic or Theory of Thinking, A Translation and Commentary Edited and Translated by Timothy Franz, New York: Oxford University Press, 2024.

== See also ==
- Friedrich Heinrich Jacobi
- Karl Leonhard Reinhold
- Gottlob Ernst Schulze
