= Margot Philips =

New Zealand painter

Margot Leonie Luise Philips
- Born: 5 April 1902; Duisburg, Germany
- Died: 30 December 1988 (aged 86)
- Occupation: Painter

Margot Leonie Luise Philips (5 April 1902 – 30 December 1988) was a New Zealand painter. Her artworks are held in the collections of Auckland Art Gallery Toi o Tāmaki and the Museum of New Zealand Te Papa Tongarewa.

== Early life ==
Philips was born to a Jewish family in Duisburg, Germany, the youngest of five children. Philips' father died while she was young, and by the early 1920s she was living at home to support her mother. Her parents died shortly after World War I, and Philips left Germany in 1935 to live in London, before travelling in 1958 to New Zealand to follow her brother Kurt Philips and his wife Trude, who opened Hamilton's first European-style restaurant, Vienna Cafe. The restaurant was known for its potato salad, eel, goulash and good coffee. The family faced discrimination when World War II broke out, as they were classified as "enemy aliens" and required to report weekly to the police. Philips worked in the restaurant upon her arrival in New Zealand, and through waiting tables Philips became friends with Te Puea Herangi (Princess Te Puea).

== Career ==
Philips took drawing classes at Hamilton's Technical School and the Workers' Educational Association, and then took summer school art courses at Ardmore Teachers' Training College. She also took classes at Auckland Art Gallery's summer school, where Colin McCahon mentored and taught her. Philips' works focused mostly on her visualisation of the Waikato landscape.

Philips exhibited widely in New Zealand, including:

- Contemporary New Zealand Painting and Sculpture 1962 at the Auckland Art Gallery (1962). This group show toured other New Zealand centres during 1963.
- Manawatu Prize for Contemporary Art 1967, with Gretchen Albrecht, Milan Mrkusich, Stanley Palmer, Michael Smither, Gordon Walters, Claire Jennings, Mary Le Vaillant, Valda Main, Irene O'Neill, Freda Simmonds, Julia van Helden, Hildegard Wieck, and others at the Palmerston North Art Gallery (1967).
- The Paintings of Margot Philips: A Waikato Art Museum Exhibition at the Waikato Museum, a major retrospective of her works (1983).
- Margot Philips – Her Own World, a special exhibition at the opening of the Waikato Museum of Art and History in October 1987. This exhibition was held in a gallery that was later named for her – the Margot Philips Gallery.

== Death and legacy ==
Philips died on 30 December 1988, and a service was held at Hamilton Park Cemetery at Newstead.

Playwright Campbell Smith wrote a play based on Philips' life, titled This Green Land: Margot Philips – Painter, which drew on his memories of his own friendship with Philips, plus an interview with Tim Walker (then curator of fine arts at Waikato Museum) from 1987. The play was first performed in 2002 at Hamilton's Fuel Festival, directed by Alec Forbes, and in July 2009 a production, also directed by Forbes and starring Maria Eaton and Renee Casserley, was staged at the Waikato Museum to honour the 75th anniversary of the Waikato Society of Arts.
