= Otto-Hirsch-Auszeichnung =

Religious award

The Otto-Hirsch-Auszeichnung (since 2012 Otto-Hirsch-Medaille) was donated in 1985 on the occasion of the 100th birthday of the ministerial councillor and Jewish Nazi victim Otto Hirsch and is awarded annually by the city of Stuttgart together with the Gesellschaft für Christlich-Jüdische Zusammenarbeit Stuttgart e. V. and the Jewish Religious Community to personalities who have rendered outstanding services to Christian-Jewish cooperation.

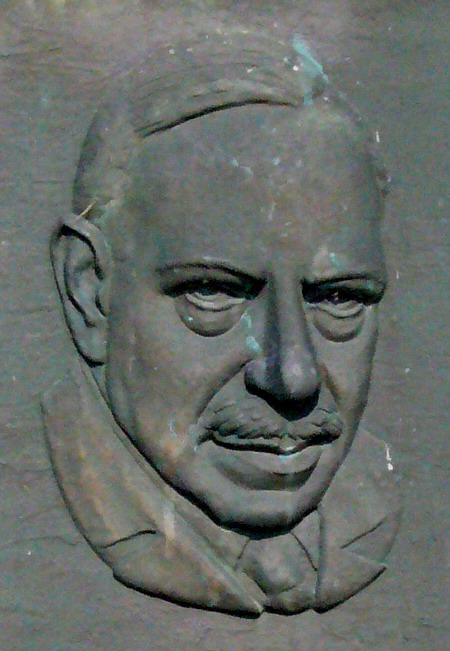
Otto Hirsch

== Prize laureates ==
- 1985: Otto Küster
- 1986: Edgar Winkler
- 1987: Fritz Majer-Leonhard, Pfarrer a. D.
- 1988: Josef Warscher
- 1989: Otfried Sander, Bürgermeister a. D.
- 1990: Jenny Heymann
- 1991: Albrecht Goes
- 1992: Rudolf Pfisterer
- 1993: Elisabet Plünnecke
- 1994: Heinz M. Bleicher
- 1995: Manfred Rommel, Oberbürgermeister a. D.
- 1996: Rachel Dror
- 1997: Walter Ott
- 1998: Rolf Thieringer, Erster Bürgermeister a. D.
- 1999: Meinhard Tenné
- 2000: Paul Sauer
- 2001: Noemi Berger
- 2002: Heinz Lauber
- 2003: Arno Fern
- 2004: Helmuth Rilling
- 2005: Michael Wieck
- 2006: Reinhold Mayer (1926–2016)
- 2007: Karl-Hermann Blickle
- 2008: Helene Schneiderman
- 2009: Joachim Hahn (evangelischer Theologe)
- 2010: Joseph Rothschild
- 2011: Gunter Demnig
- 2012: Traute Peters.
- 2013: Leopold Paul Rosenkranz.
- 2014: Initiative Gedenkstätte Killesberg
- 2015: Kolja Lessing.
- 2016: Gabriele Müller-Trimbusch
- 2017: Roland Ostertag Beate Müller, Jörg Titze
- 2018: Michael Volkmann.
- 2019: Michael Kashi
- 2020: Robert Jütte
- 2021: Monika Renninger
- 2022: Michael Blume, Hartmut Metzger
- 2023 Martin Ulmer
- 2024 Wolfgang Drexler
- 2025 Andreas Keller, Eberhard Zacher
- 2026 Burkhard C. Kosminski, Jugendzentrum HaLev

== Awards ==
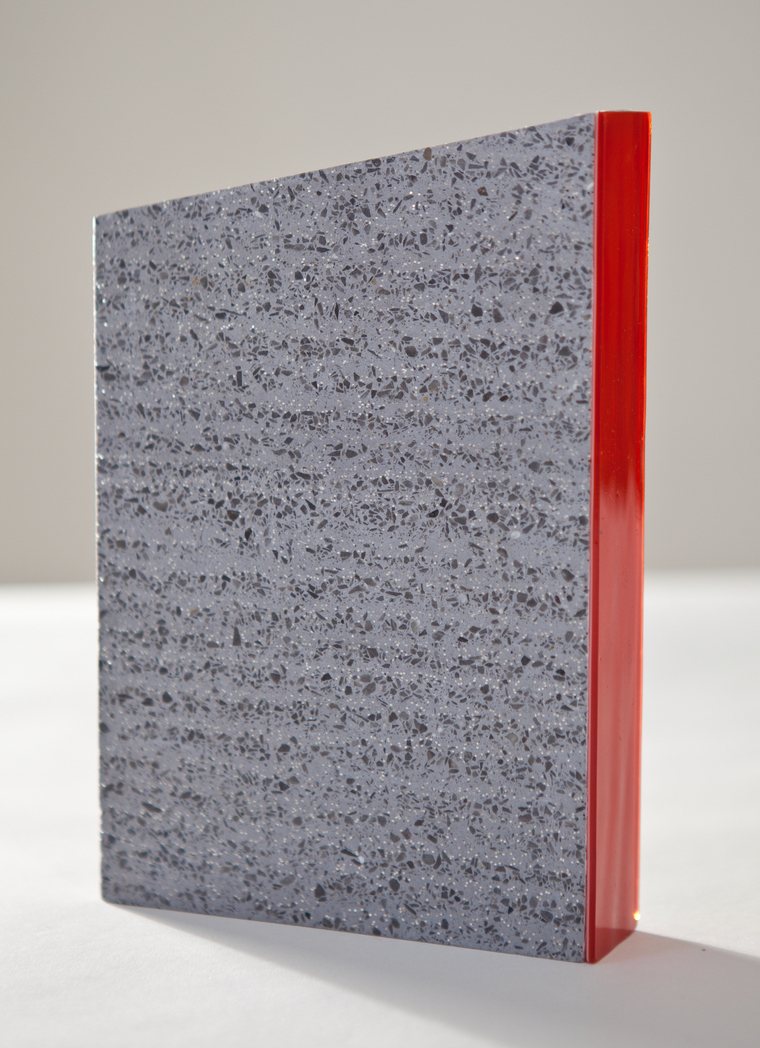
Otto Hirsch Award, Small Sculpture, Christine Braun (2012)

Since 2013, a small sculpture designed by the artist Christine Braun has been presented as an award. It consists of translucent concrete and red broad sheet glass. The design of the award picks up on the special nature of understanding between religions: "[...] permeability, connection, overcoming the divisive – in order to achieve reconciliation, peaceful, tolerant coexistence."
