= Shimshon ben Mordechai of Slonim =

Polish-Lithuanian rabbi and theologian (c.1734–1794)

Rabbi Shimshon ben Mordechai of Slonim
- Born: 1734 or 1736; Lithuania, Poland–Lithuania
- Died: 13 May 1794 (aged 59–60); Königsberg, Prussia
- Other names: Samson of Slonim
- Occupations: Chief Rabbi of Slonim and Königsberg, scientist, astronomer, philosopher, mathematician, and theologian
- Years active: 1769–1794
- Era: 18th century philosophy
- Known for: Haskalah Movement, Misnagdim Movement, Approbation of Sefer Oklidus
- Movement: Haskalah, Misnagdim
- Opponent: Hasidic Jews
- Spouse: Basha
- Children: Gershon Zelig
- Father: Mordechai
- Family: Karelitz

Shimshon (Samson) ben Mordechai of Slonim (c. 1734/1736 – 13 May 1794), was an 18th-century rabbi, philosopher, mathematician, and scientist. He was one of the leaders of Haskalah and the Misnagdim, and was influenced by the Vilna Gaon. He was the Av Beit Din of Slonim and Königsberg and is thought to have been descended from Shimshon Loew ben Bezalel, the Maharal of Prague's brother, through his grandson, Samson ben Pesah Ostropoli.

== Early life and early adulthood (c. 1734-1765) ==
Little is known about Shimshon's early life. He was born in Lithuania, sometime between 1734 and 1736. Sometime at an early age he left for Hamburg to study German, Latin, and Greek, as well as the sciences. After returning from Hamburg around 17 or 18 years of age (1751-1753), he was ordained as a rabbi. In the following years, he was rabbi in the small towns of Kolyshki and Krāslava. Later in his life, Shimshon would make frequent trips back to Hamburg, so he could buy books for his collection.

== Marriage and life in Slonim (1765–1788) ==
In around 1765, Shimshon was arranged to be married to Basha, the niece of Aryeh Leib Epstein. They married on 26 October 1765.

In 1769, Shimshon got a seat in Slonim as an Av Beit Din. He held this position until around 1791. Shimshon became greatly influenced by the movement of Haskalah. When he became Chief Rabbi, he began to spread the concept of Haskalah throughout the city.

=== Shimshon's library ===
Shimshon had a small library in his house of around 250 to 300 books that he had collected on his journeys to Hamburg and other cities. Figures such as the Vilna Gaon and Salomon Maimon came to Slonim to borrow books from his library. Among Shimshon's prized possessions was the unpublished work by the rabbi Joseph Solomon Delmedigo, Bosmat Bat Shelomoh.

=== Salomon Maimon's visit ===
In the 1770s, a young Salomon Maimon came from Nyasvizh to visit the library in search of books on science and medicine. According to Maimon, "As soon as I arrived at the place, I went to the chief rabbi, told him my desire, and begged him earnestly for assistance... He promised to lend me some old German books. The most important among these were an old work on Optics, and Sturm's Physics." (likely Johann Christoph Sturm). These books inspired Maimon to find "a key to all secrets of nature" and look down upon others who did not know what he knew. This connection was identified by historian Samuel Joseph Fuenn in his book Safah le-Ne'emanim (1881).

=== Meeting with Baruch Schick of Shklov ===
In 1778, upon the recommendation of the Vilna Gaon, Baruch Schick of Shklov (1744-1808) journeyed to Slonim to ask Shimshon to write an approbation to the first ever Hebrew translation of Euclid's Elements, Sefer Oklidus. Shimshon agreed and wrote part of the introduction to the book. Several other rabbis such as Saul Loewenstamm and Solomon Shalem from The Hague and Amsterdam contributed to the introduction as well.

Firstly, he talked about the proper place Euclid had in history. Shimshon made the assumption that Euclid lived in Greece right around when Mordecai and Esther were living in Persia. Next, he gave a lengthy summary of the contents of the book..

To conclude his writing, Shimshon related it all back to Schick's wish to educate Jews on the sciences. His words followed the same theme that Schick wrote, "Blessed is your logic, and it will bear forth more blessing, for in your book you have refuted the claims our enemies level against us, saying ‘where is your wisdom and your learning in the eyes of the nations?’ Jacob will not be ashamed, for the land will be filled with knowledge, as the waters cover the sea." Shimshon referred to the Jews being thought of as uneducated and ignorant. His intentions were to bring science and mathematics into the Jewish people's everyday lives, so they could be recognized as more intelligent and civilized people.

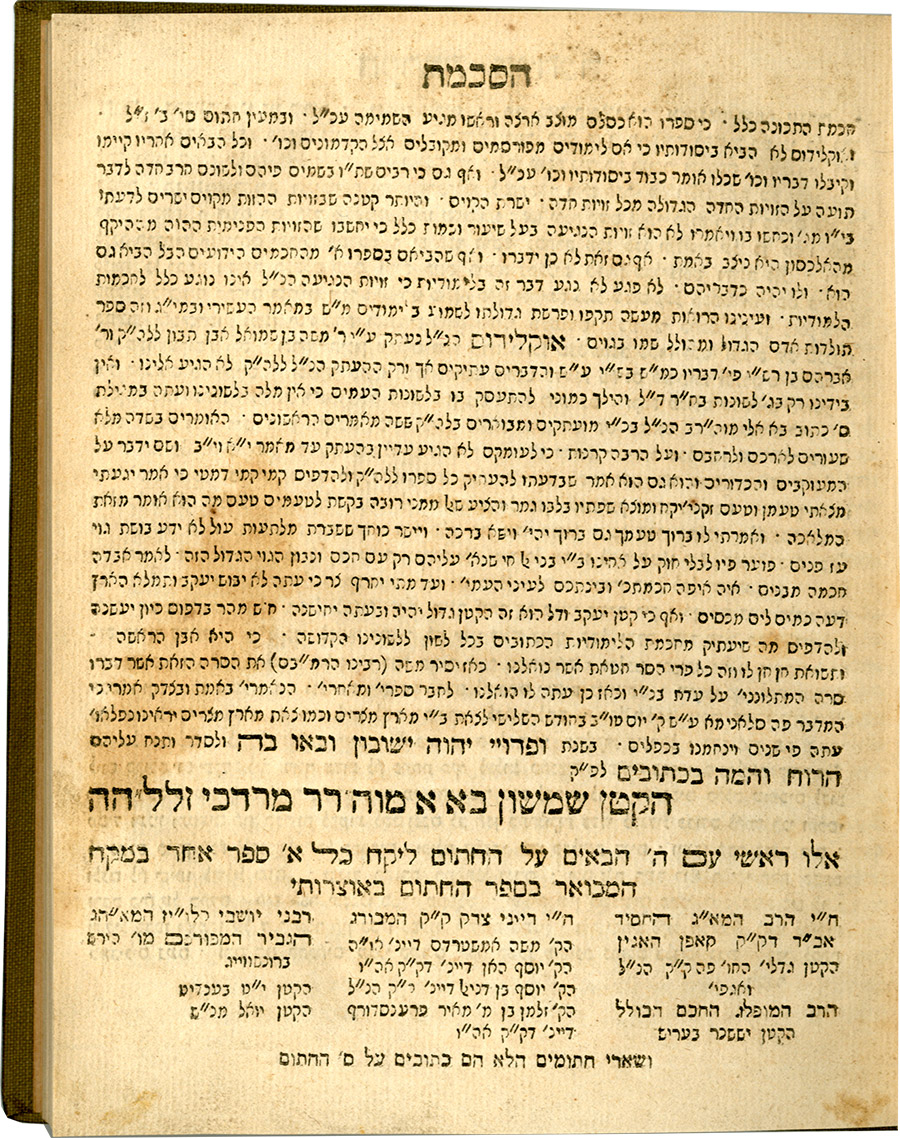
Approbation by Shimshon ben Mordechai of Slonim in Sefer Oklidus (Euclid's Elements Hebrew Translation).

=== Jeremy Bentham's visit ===
In December, 1787, the English philosopher, Jeremy Bentham, was going to visit his brother, Samuel in Krichev, when he spent the night in Slonim. As he writes in his journal, all of the inns were full, so he was forced to spend the night with a rabbi who also kept a hardware store. He goes on to describe the rabbi's home and that he had two bookcases with "not fewer than 250 or 300 Vols.". Bentham also talked about how the rabbi possessed a copy of Euclid's Elements, as well as a manuscript on astronomy which contained a diagram that was the rabbi's own work. Historians such as Israel Bartal have logically assumed that this was the same rabbi who lent Solomon Maimon books nine years earlier.

== Final years (1788-1794) ==
Sometime in the late 1780s, after Bentham's visit, a fire started in the thatch roof of Shimshon's house. It eventually consumed everything in his house including all of his books and manuscripts. He became stricken with grief. It is said that after the fire, "Shimshon eulogized his loss in the synagogue and cried bitter tears."

In 1791, after the fire, he left town for a spot as an Av Beit Din in the town of Königsberg. By that point, Shimshon was very sick and tired. He only spent time there for several years until his death in May 1794.

== Legacy ==
All of Shimshon's books and his own manuscripts were destroyed in the aforementioned fire. This unfortunately has limited many historians from being able to determine his role in Jewish history. In his family's tradition he was known as "a scholar and Kabbalist, an astronomer and philosopher, accomplished in all seven sciences, the author of many books, on the exoteric and the esoteric, and the chokhmot." Shimshon was also remembered for bringing Haskalah to Slonim as well as being a Mitnaged. He also encouraged bringing education into every Jew's everyday lives. He is regarded as being one of the most influential rabbis of Slonim, alongside Moses ben Isaac Judah Lima.

=== Descendants ===
Shimshon's descendants mostly settled in Kosava. They adopted the surname, Karelitz after the town of Karelichy. Some of his most famous rabbinical descendants were the Rabbis Avrohom Yeshaya Karelitz (author of the Chazon Ish), Nissim Karelitz, and Shmaryahu Yosef Chaim Kanievsky.

Other descendants include politician Frank N. Newman, author Jean Hanff Korelitz, the mathematician Leonard Carlitz, real estate developer, Gary Barnett, Dr. Samuel Karelitz, pediatrician and founding chairman of Long Island Jewish Medical Center (LIJ), and former Massachusetts State Representative Clarence Karelitz.

Descendants of Shimshon ben Mordechai of Slonim

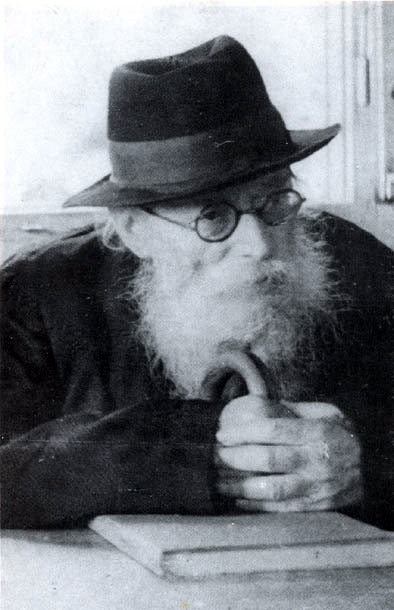
Rabbi Avrohom Yeshaya Karelitz (1878-1953) (The Chazon Ish)

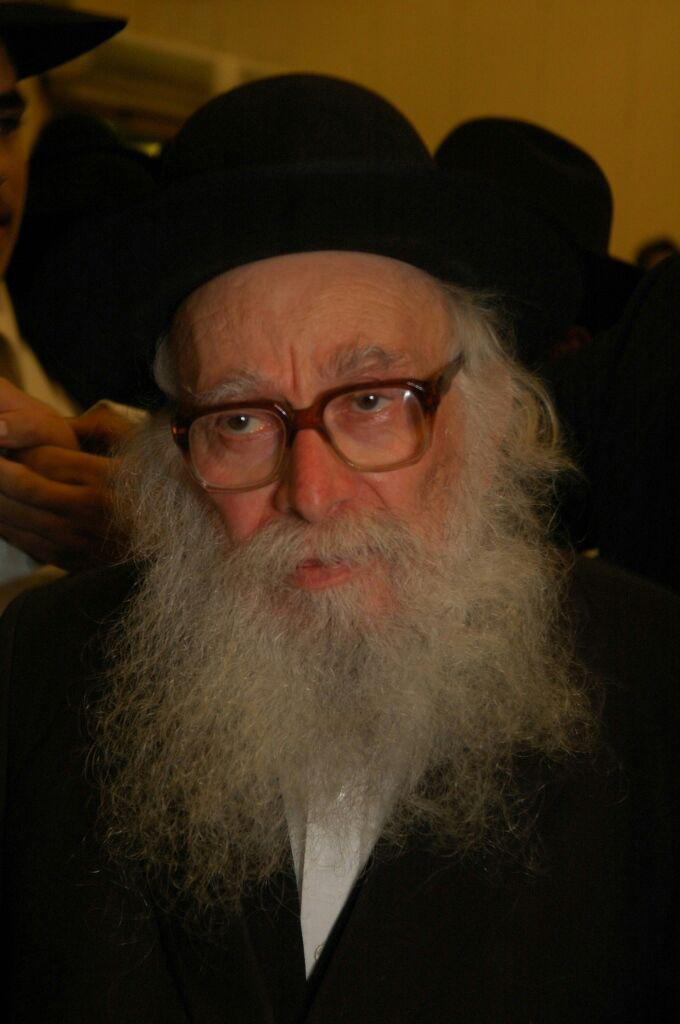
Rabbi Nissim Karelitz (1926-2019)

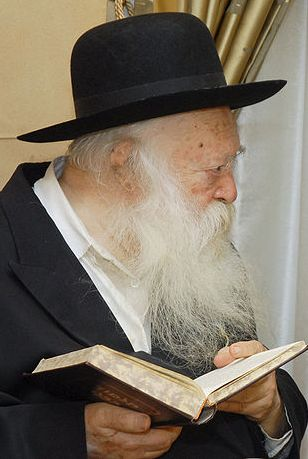
Rabbi Shmaryahu Yosef Chaim Kanievsky (1928-)

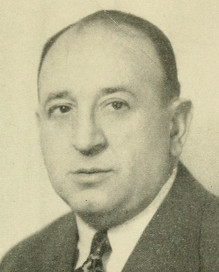
Clarence Karelitz (Massachusetts State Representative) (1901-1958)

== Notable associates ==
- Shlomo ben Joshua, Solomon Maimon (1753–1800) German philosopher
- Rabbi Elijah ben Solomon Zalman, Vilna Gaon (1720–1797) leader of Mitnagdim and Haskalah
- Rabbi Baruch ben Jacob Schick, Baruch Schick of Shklov (1744–1808) one of the pioneers of Haskalah and author
- Rabbi Aryeh Leib ben Mordechai Epstein of Königsberg, Aryeh Leib Epstein of Königsberg (1708–1775) rabbi and author of Or ha-Shanim
- Rabbi Yitzhak ben Aryeh Leib Epstein, Ichile Ginshpriker of Slonim (1730–1807) Basha (Shimshon's wife's) first cousin. Son of Rabbi Aryeh Leib Epstein of Königsberg

== See also ==
- Getzel Kressel (1911–1986) Israeli author
- Samuel Joseph Fuenn (1818–1891) Russian scholar
- Menachem Mendel Frankfurter (1742–1823) founder of the Talmud Torah in Hamburg
- Eliezer Segal (1950–) Canadian professor
- Rabbi Ephraim ben Shlomo Zalman Epstein of Vilna rabbi and author of Gevurot ha-Ari. Great-grandson of Rabbi Aryeh Leib Epstein of Königsberg
- Kalman Lichtenstein (born 1899) author of Pinkas Slonim (Memorial book of Slonim)
- Israel Bartal (1946–) Israeli professor
