= Cremer & Wolffenstein =

Architecture bureau

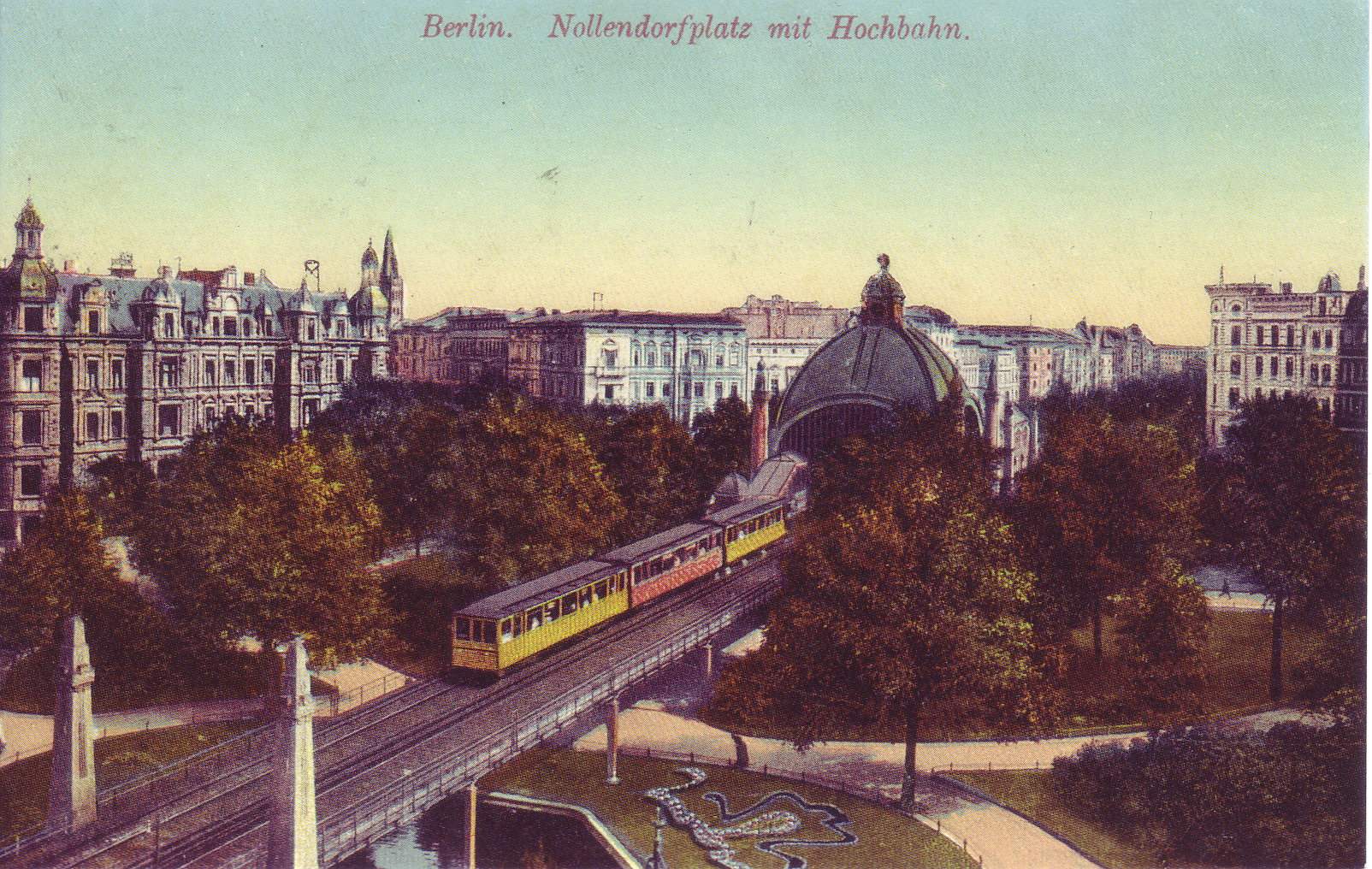
Postcard showing Nollendorfplatz c. 1900, with the Hochbahn and Cremer & Wolffenstein's Jugendstil dome

The Cremer & Wolffenstein architecture firm was founded in Germany in 1882 by Richard Wolffenstein (1846–1919) and Wilhelm Cremer (1845–1919) and existed up to the death of its two founders. During the so-called Gründerzeit in Berlin, the years of rapid industrial expansion in Germany at the end of the 19th century, they were a prolific firm in the various aspects of architecture. As one of the largest firms in Berlin at the turn of the century, they designed residential, commercial, transportation, government, and religious buildings. They built a number of synagogues, won second place in the 1882 competition to design the Reichstag, and were also involved in planning the Hochbahn overhead railway installation between Kreuzberg and Nollendorfplatz.

== Wilhelm Cremer ==
Wilhelm Albert Cremer was born on 15 November 1845 in Cologne and died on 28 March 1919 in Berlin. In 1867 he passed the bricklayer master examination, a prerequisite for his longer studies from 1868 to 1875 at the Berliner Bauakademie. Parallel to this education he also studied privately with August Orth. After conclusion of his studies he worked as a private architect and as a teacher at the Unterrichtsanstalt des Kunstgewerbemuseums Berlin, who appointed him to professor in 1885. In 1878, at the school, he made the acquaintance of another professor Richard Wolffenstein, and in 1882 they created the architecture firm of Cremer & Wolffenstein. With Richard Wolffenstein, on 8 June 1879, he became a founding member of the Vereinigung Berliner Architekten or Union of Berlin Architects, an offshoot of private architects from the Architektenverein zu Berlin. Starting in 1883 he taught additionally at the Technische Hochschule in Charlottenburg (now Technische Universität Berlin). In 1907 he was appointed the head of the planning and building department and in 1912 Geheimen Baurat. Few projects of Wilhelm Cremer are known that were not work of the firm, one example is the evangelical church in Neuwied of 1880. Although the partner in a firm that designed many synagogues, Cremer was a Christian.

== Richard Wolffenstein ==
Richard Wolffenstein was born on 7 September 1846 in Berlin and died there on 13 April 1919. He was the son of a dye factory owner who studied trade school and acquired the high school diploma in 1864. He was apprenticed as a mason between 1864 and 1868 and studied subsequently at the Berliner Bauakademie. Beside his education, he worked in the architecture offices of Kyllmann & Heyden, and Hude & Hennicke. After the master builder examination in 1873, he was active with the architect Wilhelm Neumann, specializing in state administration for the next three years. From the years 1876 to 1878, he led an extended study trip through Italy, the Netherlands, Britain, France and Spain. Through teaching at the Unterrichtsanstalt des Kunstgewerbemuseums Berlins from 1878 to 1896 he met Wilhelm Cremer and in 1882 they formed the firm Cremer & Wolffenstein. Richard Wolffenstein was a founding member of the Vereinigung Berliner Architekten on 8 June 1879 and in 1898 was a board member. In 1907 he was a Baurat and in 1912 he was appointed Geheimen Baurat.

== Synagogues ==
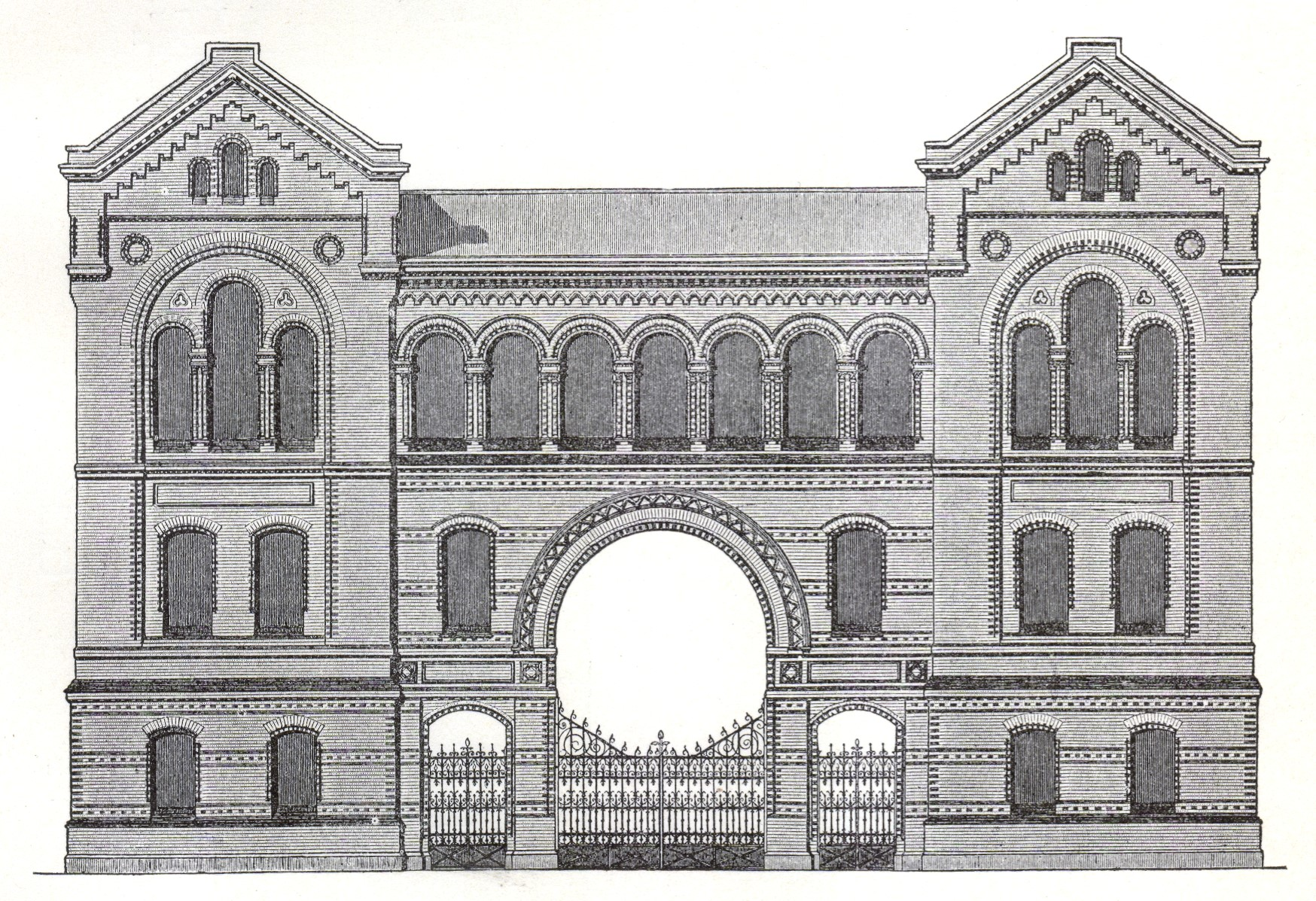
Facade of the Lindenstraße Synagogue in Kreuzberg, Berlin (1889–1891); destroyed in the Reichspogromnacht.

Synagogues were a speciality of the office, perhaps because of Wolffenstein's Jewish background. The two architects are considered the most important representatives of the building of synagogues of the Gründerzeit. For their work in this field they found inspiration in Dresden's Semper Synagogue (destroyed in 1938 during the Kristallnacht pogrom), the only sacral building by Gottfried Semper, with its simple basic concept and cube formed arrangements. Of the eleven synagogues designed by Cremer & Wolffenstein, eight were built, among them the New Synagogue in Königsberg in Prussia. But all suffered the same fate as their model in Dresden and were destroyed during the Kristallnacht.

In 1996, the Lindenstraße Synagogue was the subject of a memorial designed by Zvi Hecker, Eyal Weizmann, and sculptor Micha Ullman. In the courtyard of the present office building, they designed an arrangement of concrete benches placed in the pattern of the seating in the original synagogue. The courtyard and memorial is accessed through a large ground floor opening, much like the central passageway that figured prominently in the Cremer & Wolffenstein synagogue.

== Style ==
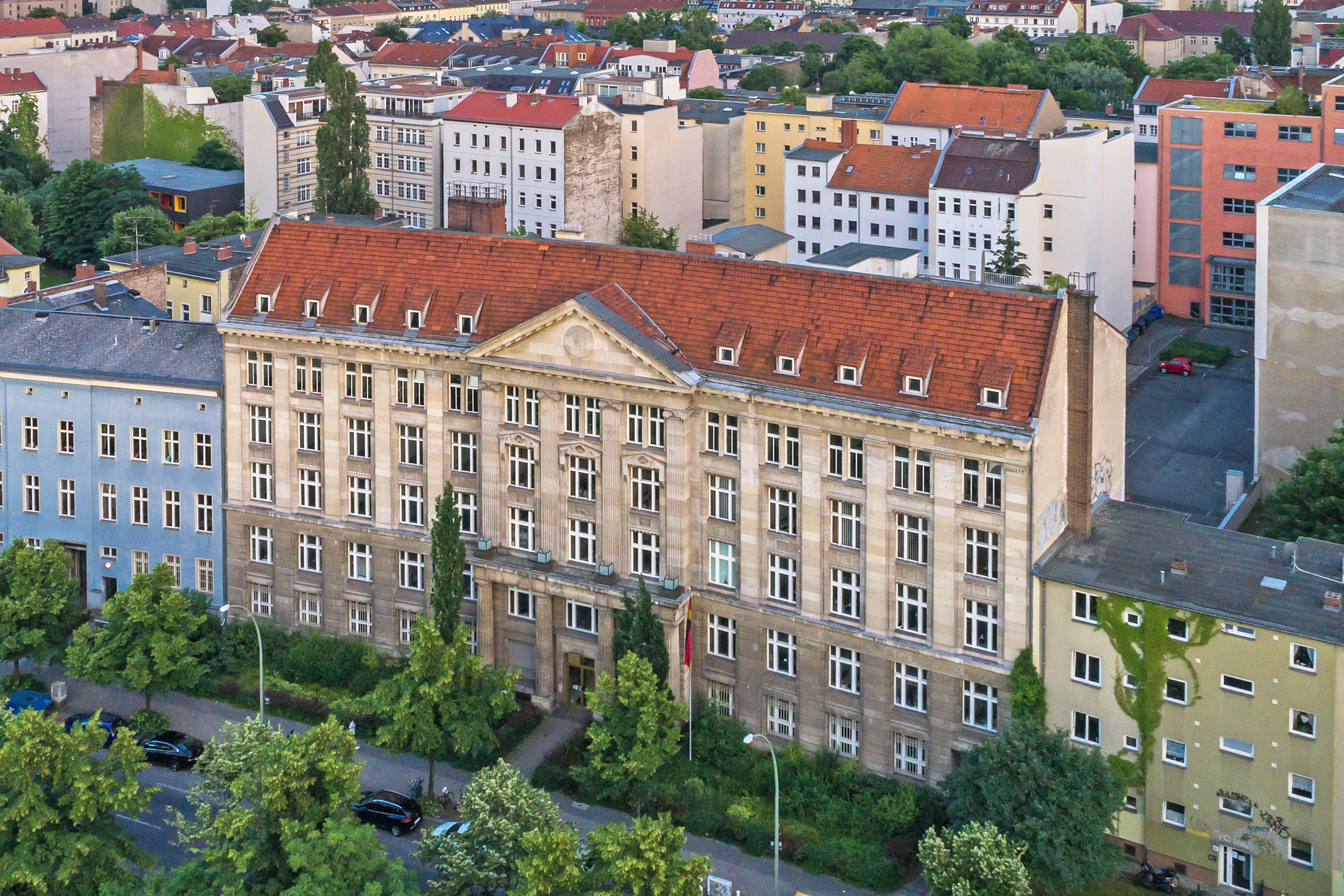
Administrative building of Orenstein & Koppel at Tempelhofer Ufer 23–24 in Berlin (1913–1914)

The Cremer & Wolffenstein firm was renowned for its simple and functional designs. Initially the two architects preferred Neo-Renaissance influences, but later they would use a variety of historical styles. The houses and office buildings in the Kaiser-Wilhelm-Straße were among the first Neo-baroque buildings of Berlin. In some works Jugendstil influences can already be found, though their overall tendency was towards eclecticism.

== Gallery ==
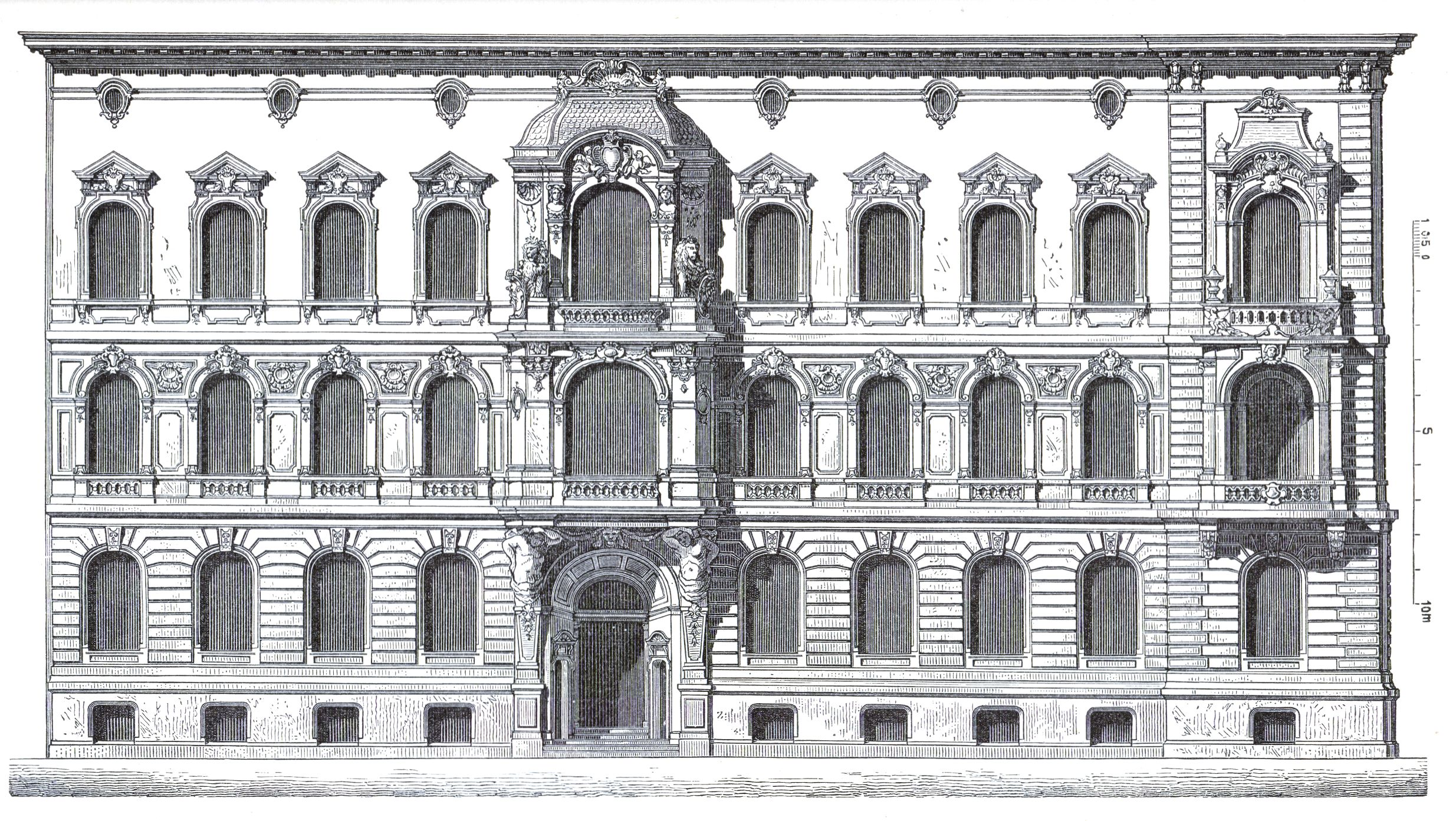
Design for the residence and office building on the corner of Behrenstraße and Wilhelmstraße, Berlin (1886–1887; destroyed)

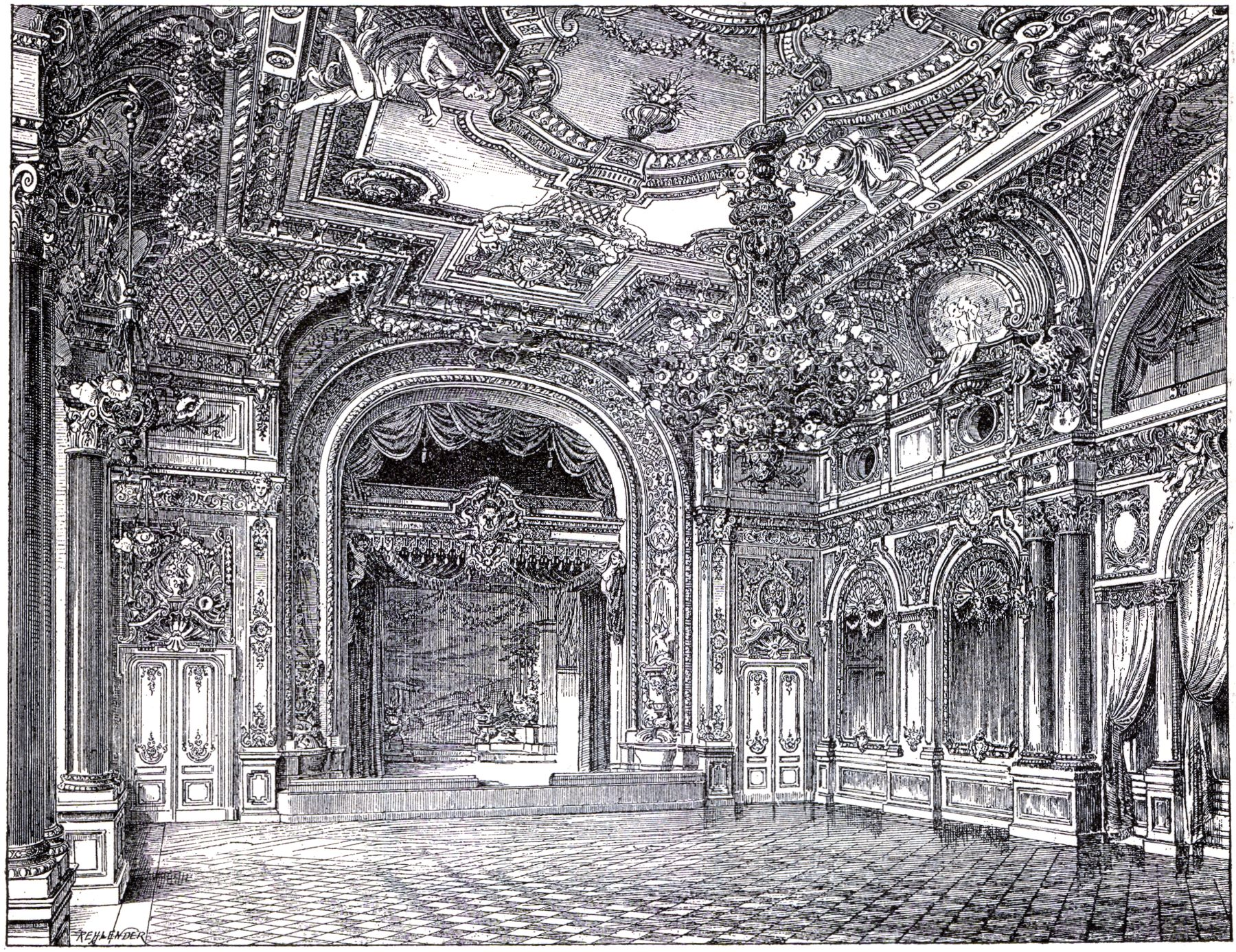
Ballroom in the house of the Geselliger Verein der Freundschaft und der Freude (1887; destroyed)

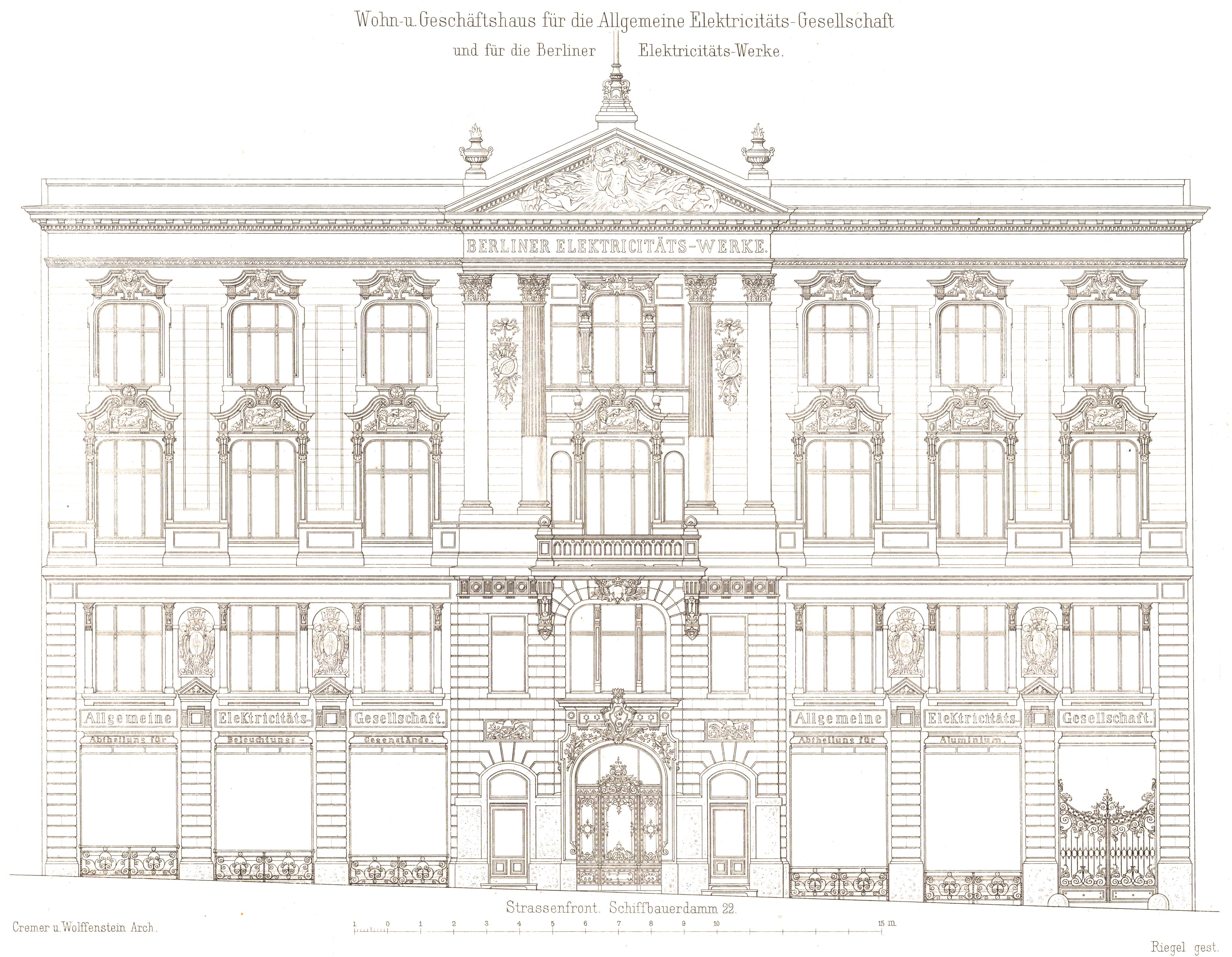
Facade of the administrative building of AEG at Schiffbauerdamm 22 in Berlin (1888–1890; destroyed)

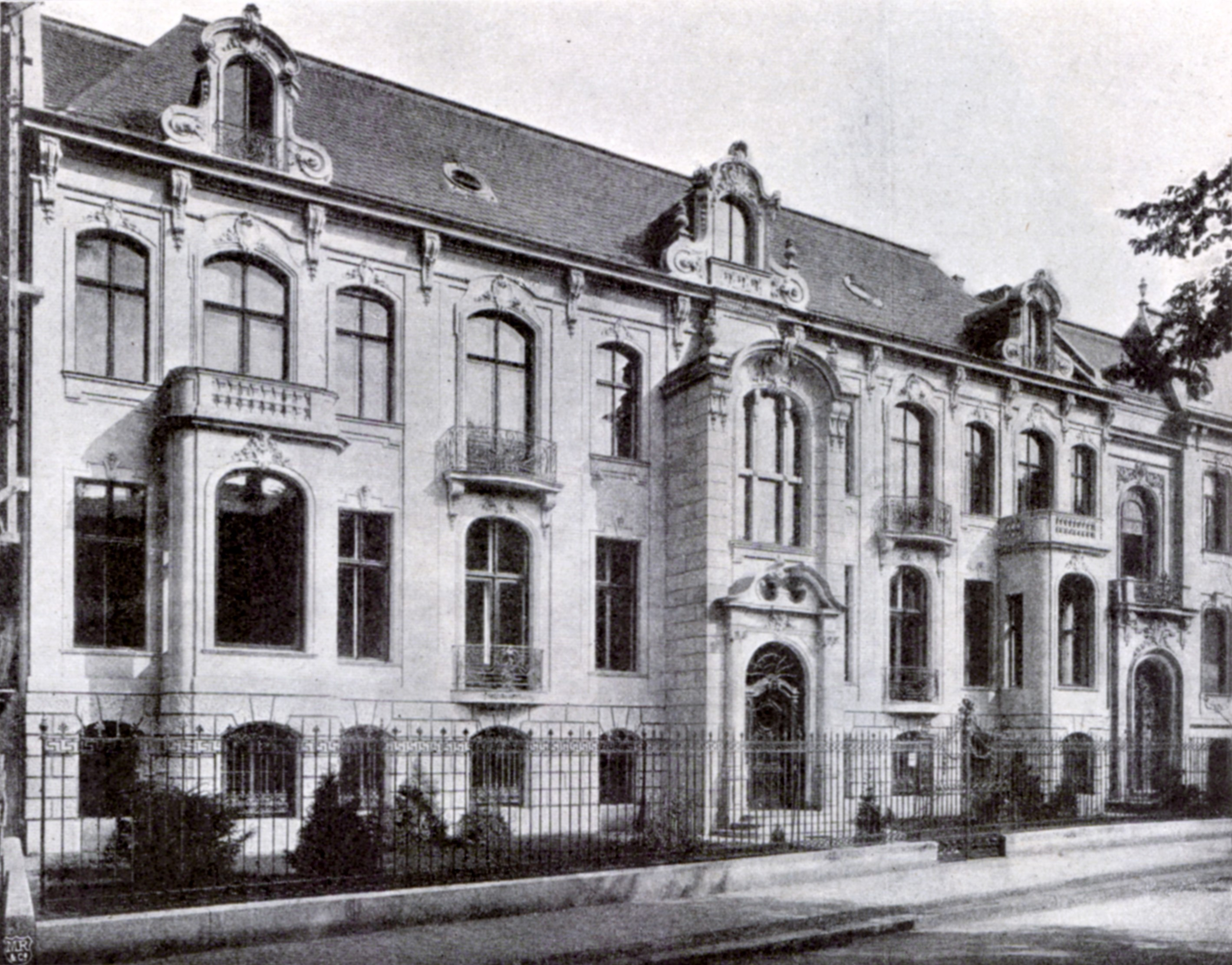
Residential houses at Mathäikirchstraße 32 and 33 (1893–1894; destroyed)

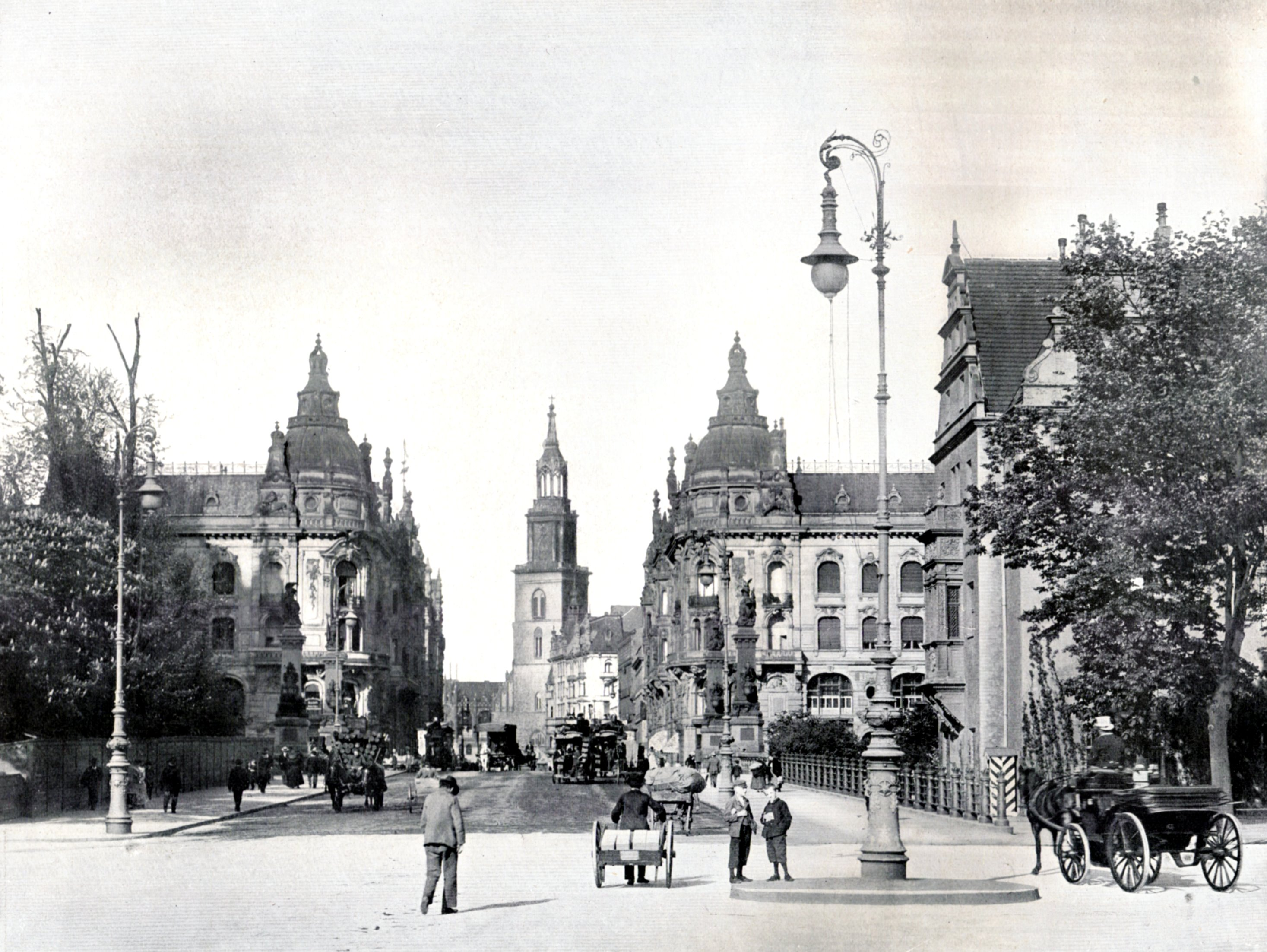
Kaiser-Wilhelm-Straße with its front buildings by Cremer & Wolffenstein (around 1900)

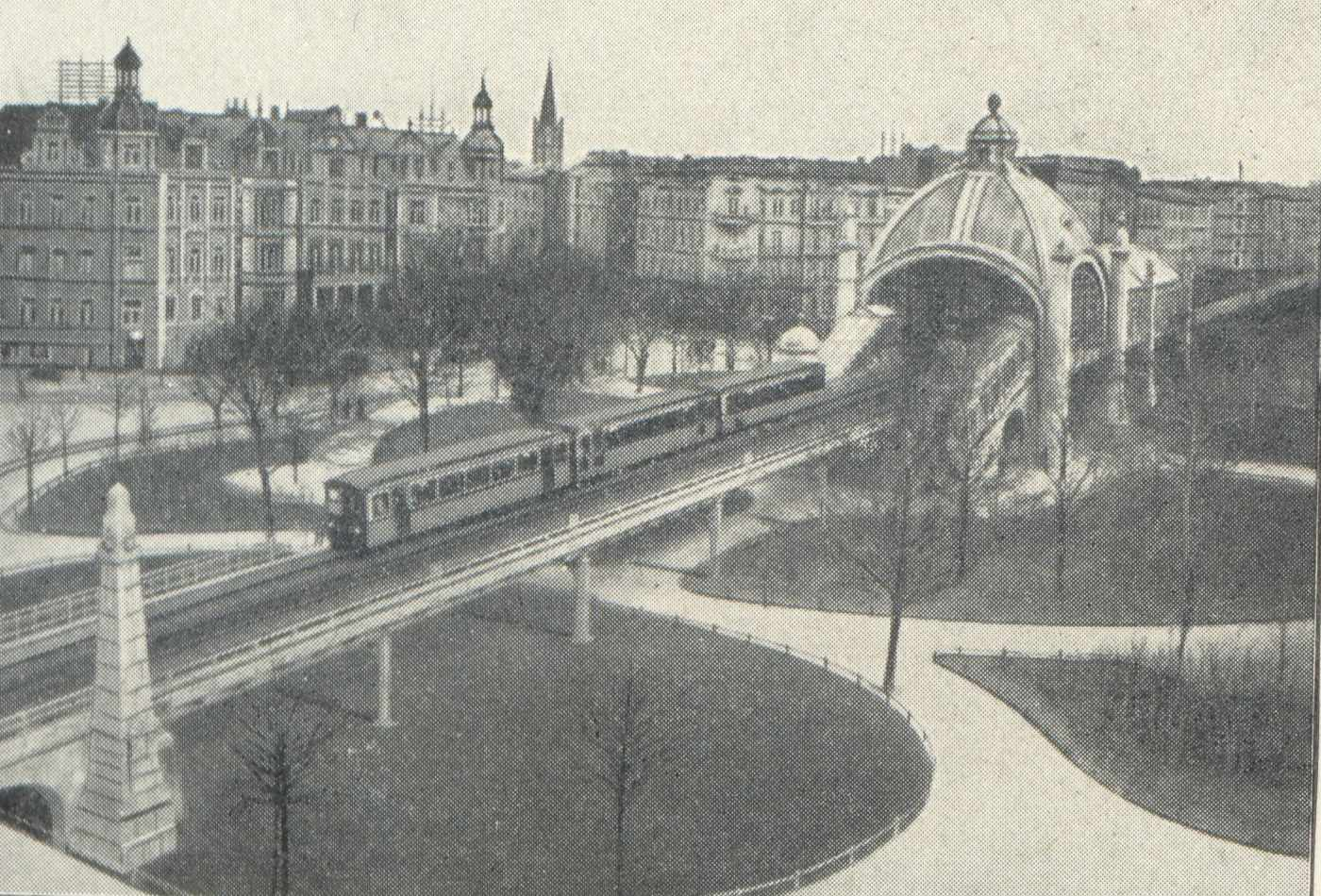
The overhead railway and original dome of U-Bahn station Nollendorfplatz (1902)

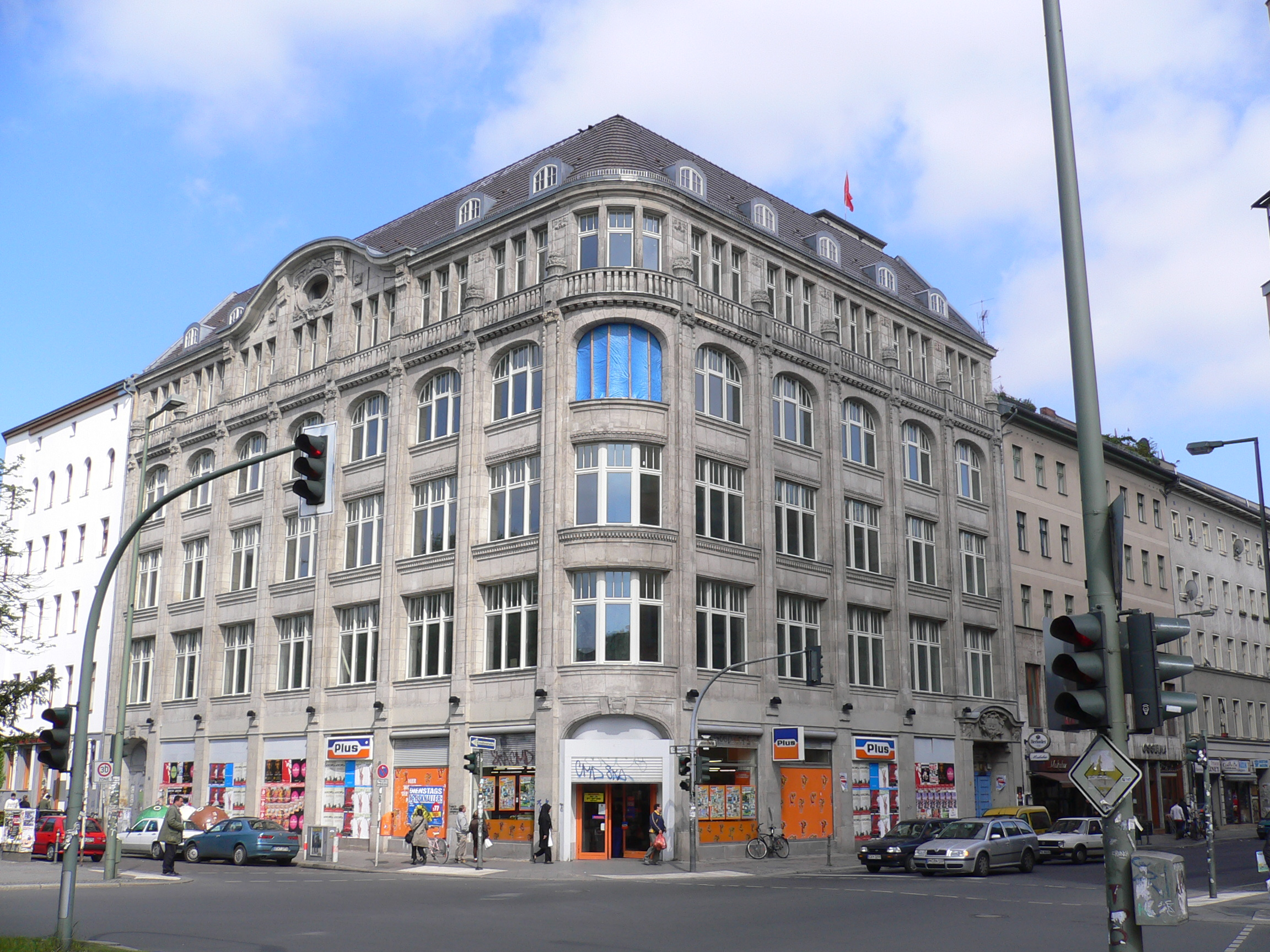
Administrative building at Oranienplatz/Ornanienstraße 40/41 (1913)

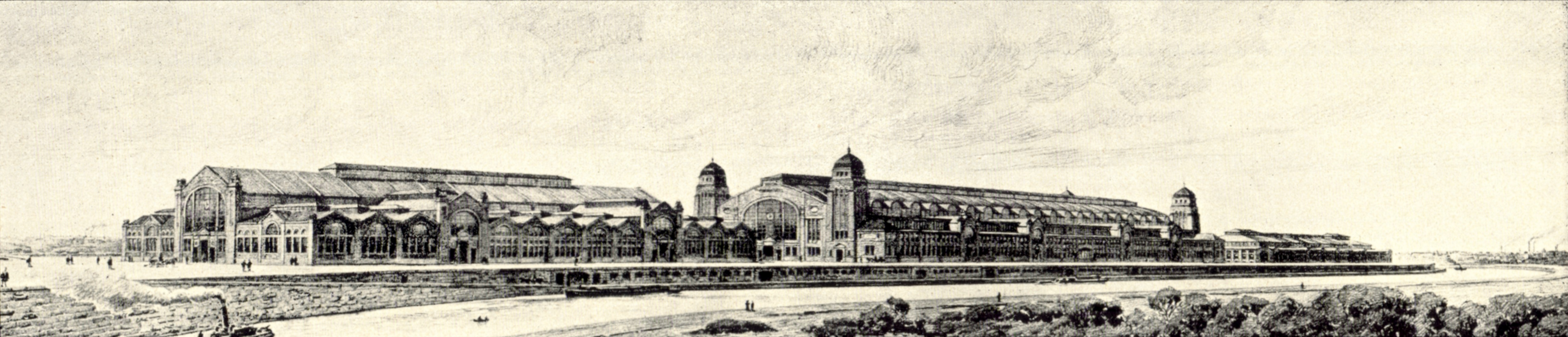
Project for a market hall in Berlin (1914)

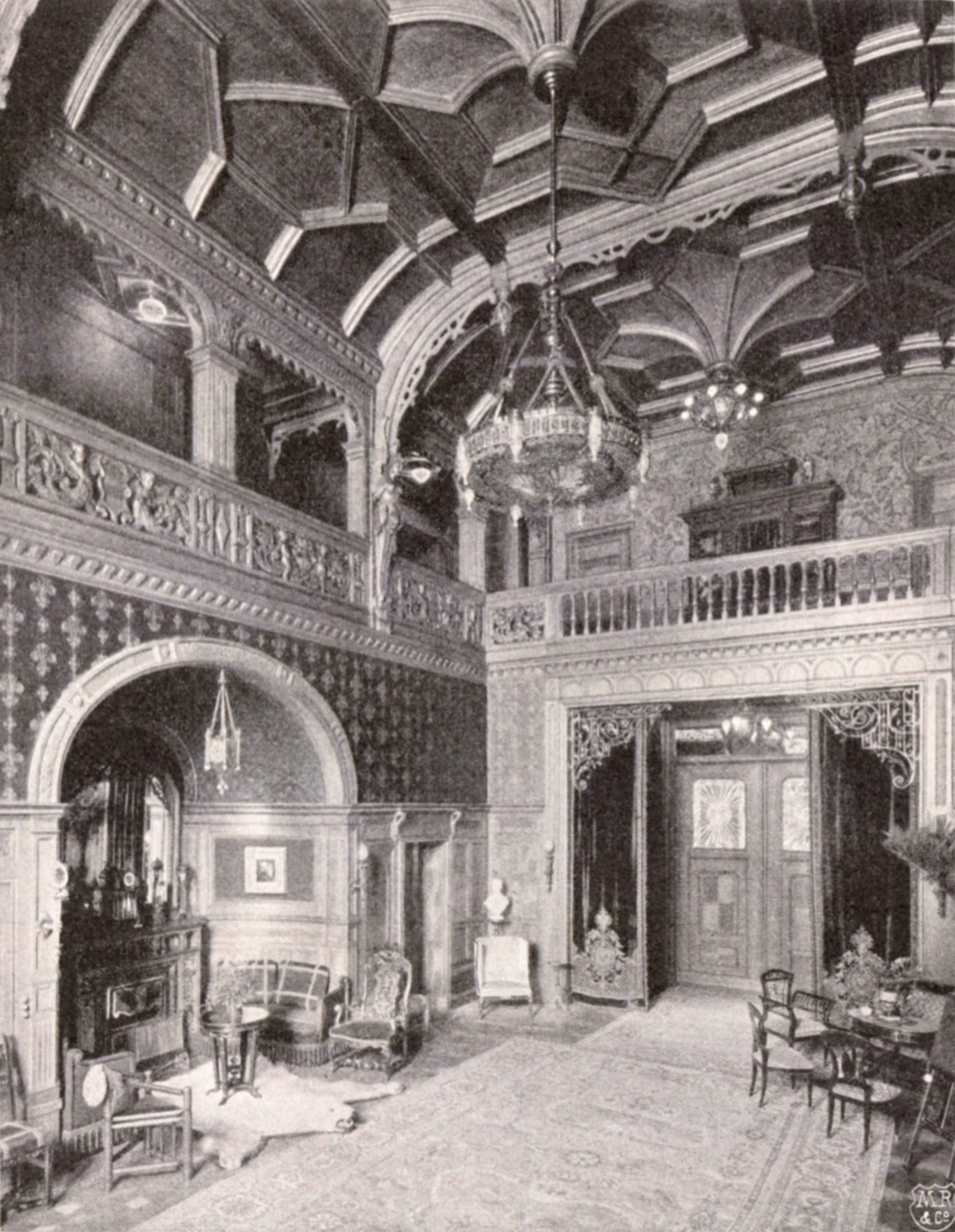
Residential house Steinthal – entrance hall (destroyed)

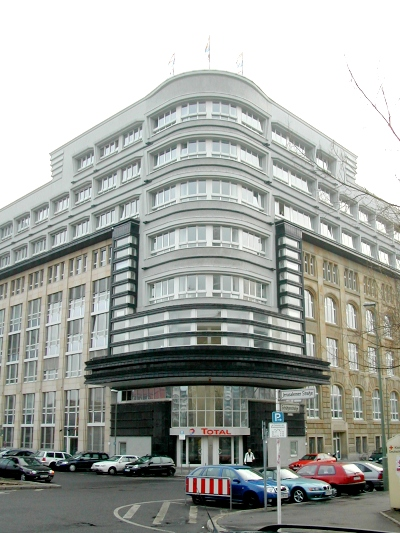
Mossehaus, corner of Jerusalemer Straße and Schützenstraße. In 1921–1923 Erich Mendelsohn added futuristic extra storeys to a damaged building from 1901–1903 by Cremer & Wolffenstein.

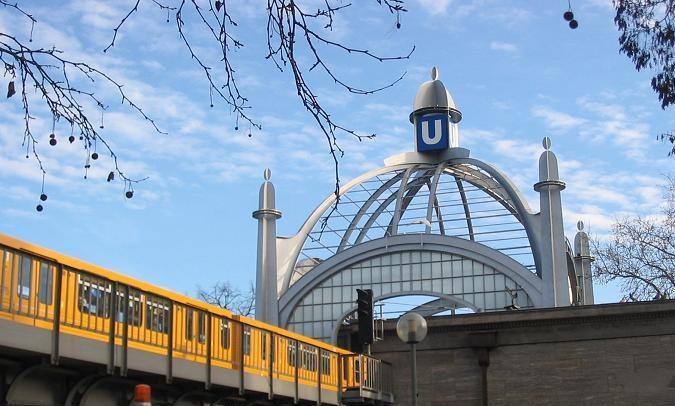
In 2002 U-Bahn station Nollendorfplatz received a glass dome that closely resembles the destroyed original by Cremer & Wolffenstein
