= Michael Wieck =

German violinist and author (1928–2021)

Michael Wieck (19 July 1928 – 27 February 2021) was a German violinist and author. Wieck's memoir, Zeugnis vom Untergang Königsbergs (Witness to the fall of Königsberg), was published in 1989. In it he relates his and his partly Jewish family's sufferings under the Nazis and, after the German defeat, under the Soviets. The book was translated into English in 2003 under the title A Childhood Under Hitler and Stalin: Memoirs of a "Certified Jew", and in 2004 into Russian as Закат Кёнигсберга (Sunset of Königsberg). A revised Russian edition was published in 2015.

== Biography ==
Wieck was born in Königsberg, the capital of East Prussia (now Kaliningrad, Russia). He was the son of two Königsberg musicians who were widely known before the Nazi era, Kurt Wieck and Hedwig Wieck-Hulisch. They were founders of the popular Königsberger Streichquartett (Königsberg String Quartet). Wieck was a grand-nephew of Clara Schumann (née Wieck).

After consultation with a local rabbi, his Jewish mother and his nominally Protestant, but in religious matters indifferent, father decided to bring up their children, Michael and his sister, Miriam (born 1925), as Jews and enrolled them with the Jewish congregation in Königsberg. According to Jewish religious law a person born from a Jewish mother is Jewish by birth. Following promulgation of the 1935 anti-Jewish Nuremberg Laws, Wieck and his sister were categorized, not as Mischlinge (mixed race), but as Geltungsjuden ("persons considered to be Jewish"), who in some cases were spared from the Holocaust.

After Adolf Hitler came to power in January 1933, the Wiecks experienced the gradual ramping-up of anti-Semitic discrimination and oppression. First Michael and Miriam were ejected from public schools and sent to Jewish schools. Later they were forbidden to attend classes at all. In 1938 Miriam was sent to a boarding school in Scotland in a Kindertransport, taking the place of another German-Jewish girl who had gone to the United States. As a result, she survived the war.

Shortly thereafter, young Michael Wieck was compelled to work in factories. In mid-1941 Wieck celebrated his Bar Mitzva in the small Orthodox synagogue Adass Jisroel, since the main Jewish synagogue of Königsberg had been destroyed in the Nazi Kristallnacht pogrom of November 1938. During the pogrom perpetrators vandalized the interior of the Orthodox synagogue hall, but spared it from arson because it was housed in a residential building. Later the congregation restored a prayer hall in the building and used it until the few remaining Königsberg synagogues were banned.

The Wieck family experienced the pain of parting with emigrating Jewish relatives and friends – most acutely when the Nazi regime in October 1941 began systematic deportations of German Jews to ghettos and concentration camps. However, because Wieck's parents were in a mixed marriage – Kurt Wieck had no known recent Jewish ancestors – they were spared deportation and ultimately genocide, unlike most members of Königsberg's Jewish community, which dated back four centuries. Although the Wiecks experienced isolated acts of kindness from a few non-Jewish neighbors, they were tormented by others, and life became more and more difficult for them as the war dragged on.

In late August 1944, Königsberg was repeatedly fire-bombed by the British Royal Air Force, and much of the city's center, including the medieval castle and the 14th century Königsberg Cathedral, was destroyed, gutted or heavily damaged. "The people of Königsberg will never expunge these nights of terror from their memory," Wieck wrote later.

When the Red Army, after a bitterly fought siege lasting nearly three months, conquered Königsberg on April 9, 1945 – one month before the end of World War II – the city had become a vast graveyard of rubble. Of the 316,000 people who lived there before the war, perhaps 100,000 remained, and Wieck estimated that about half of these were to die of hunger, disease, or maltreatment before the last Germans were allowed (or forced) to leave in 1949-50. The Soviet authorities declined to recognize the few surviving German Jews in Königsberg as victims of the Nazis, and initially treated all German-speakers as enemies.

Wieck's incarceration in a Soviet prison camp near Königsberg-Rothenstein, and the story of how he and his parents barely managed to eke out an existence thereafter in Kaliningrad – as the city was renamed in July 1946 – occupy the second half of his book. In 1949, the Wiecks finally were allowed to go to the Soviet Zone of occupation in truncated and divided Germany. Wieck left the Soviet zone as soon as possible and lived first in West Berlin, where "Gentile" paternal relatives had survived. He was deputy leader of the Berlin Chamber Orchestra until 1961 when he was appointed to teach violin at the University of Auckland. His wife, Hildegard Wieck, was a painter who became well-established in Auckland. He stayed in New Zealand until 1968 when he returned to Germany.

On his return to Germany Wieck settled in Stuttgart. An accomplished violinist, he became first concert master of the Stuttgart Chamber Orchestra, and in 1974-93 was also first violinist in the Radio Symphony Orchestra of Stuttgart.

In his memoir, Wieck muses on human nature and speculates on ultimate causes and the nature of the deity. Although he retained a strong emotional attachment to Judaism, he ultimately espoused a kind of deism, alluding to "a definite feeling of something 'lying behind it all' that always resists being put into words." Regarding human nature and humankind’s potential for good and evil, he said:

All people, be they musicians or politicians, Germans or New Zealanders, Jews or Christians, the persecutors or the persecuted, are frighteningly the same irrespective of different temperaments, ideals and conventions. In all of us resides the potential for every possible action.

== Awards ==
In 2005, Wieck was awarded the Otto Hirsch Medaille – an annual honor given to persons who have served the cause of German-Jewish reconciliation. The award is named after Otto Hirsch (1885-1941), a German-Jewish lawyer and politician from Stuttgart who was imprisoned by the Nazis and ultimately tortured to death at Mauthausen Concentration Camp in German-annexed Austria.

On 17 November 2016 Wieck was awarded Germany's Order of Merit. In presenting the award on behalf of German President Joachim Gauck, Stuttgart Mayor Fritz Kuhn said that, in his life and work, "Wieck combines cultural, social, political and musical commitment. His commitment to an open, tolerant and equitable society is impressive."

== Bibliography ==
- Michael Wieck: Zeugnis vom Untergang Königsbergs: Ein "Geltungsjude" berichtet, Heidelberger Verlaganstalt, 1990, 1993, ISBN 3-89426-059-9.
- Michael Wieck: A Childhood Under Hitler and Stalin: Memoirs of a "Certified Jew," University of Wisconsin Press, 2003, ISBN 0-299-18544-3.
