= Harf =

Harf may refer to:

- Al harf, Yemen
- HArF, the first known compound of the chemical element argon
- Danny Harf, American wakeboarder and sports video producer
- Marie Harf (born 1981), American political commentator and former political advisor
- Stella Harf (1890–1979), German actress
