= Hildegard Wieck =

New Zealand artist

- Born: 1930; Berlin
- Died: 1993 (aged 62–63); Stuttgart
- Citizenship: Germany, New Zealand
- Occupation: Painter
- Style: Expressionism
- Spouse: Michael Wieck

Laura Hildegard Wieck (1930–1993) was a New Zealand artist. Her works are held in the collection of Te Papa and Auckland Art Gallery.

== Biography ==
Wieck was born in Berlin in 1930, and studied at the Berlin Academy of Art, from 1948 to 1951. Wieck's style followed the tradition of German Expressionism. At the Berlin Academy of Art she studied under Die Brücke painters Schmidt-Rotluff and Pechstein.

In 1950, she married Michael Wieck, a violinist. His father-in-law had been interned in the Soviet special camp Buchenwald. The couple had four children. In 1956, during a visit to Israel, Michael Wieck explored whether the country could become a homeland for him and his family with his Christian wife. However, due to the "intolerance of the Orthodox Jews," this was out of the question for him.

Wieck worked and exhibited in Berlin for 10 years, before emigrating to New Zealand in 1961 with her family. Her husband had toured New Zealand earlier that year with the Berlin Chamber Orchestra. He liked New Zealand so much that he decided to settle there to escape the political pressures of a divided Germany. One reason in particular was the sealing off of West Berlin by the Wall that same year. Wieck was a Senior Lecturer in Violin at the University of Auckland's School of Music for seven years.

Michael Wieck confessed that he had "searched in vain for a new home in New Zealand," but "the roots of our being could not be torn from German soil", and the family returned to Germany.

Hildegard Wieck died in Stuttgart in 1993.

== Exhibitions ==
- Contemporary New Zealand Painting and Sculpture, Auckland Art Gallery, 1962.
- Solo exhibitions at Ikon Gallery, 1962 and 1963.
- Contemporary New Zealand Painting Exhibition, 1962.
- Solo exhibition at Wellington Centre Gallery, 1963.
- Solo exhibition at Blom's in Napier, 1963.
- Solo exhibition at Barry Lett Galleries, 1966.
- Christian Art Exhibition at New Vision Gallery, 1967.
- Auckland Society of Arts: New Zealand Women Painters 1845-1968, 1968.
- Manawatu Prize for Contemporary Art, Palmerston North Art Gallery, 1966.
