= Hugo Falkenheim =

German academic

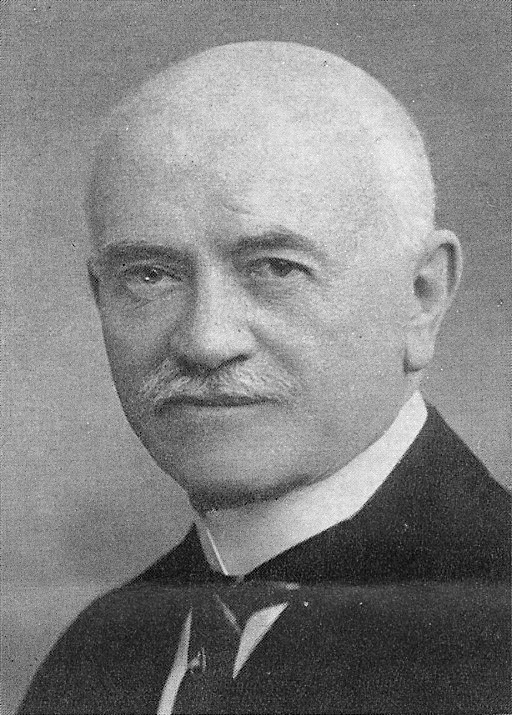
- Born: 4 September 1856; Pr. Eylau, East Prussia, Prussia
- Died: 22 September 1945 (aged 89); Rochester, New York, United States
- Occupation: pediatrist

Hugo Falkenheim (4 September 1856 – 22 September 1945) was a German Medical Doctor and the last Chairman of the Jewish congregation of Königsberg.

== Biography ==
Falkenheim was born in Preußisch Eylau (today Bagrationovsk, Russia) and studied medicine at the Universities of Königsberg and Straßburg. He specialized in pediatrics and passed his doctorate in 1881. After further studies in Vienna and Leipzig he returned to Königsberg in 1882, where he worked at the University's pediatric clinic and habilitated in 1885. In 1885 he became the director of the internist and pediatric sections of St. Elisabeth hospital, a position he held until 1935, and in 1896 Professor for pediatrics at the University of Königsberg.

Falkenheim took an active part in the foundation of a Baby nursery and was awarded the title of a Geheimer Medizinalrat in 1916. Throughout World War I he served as a physician and was finally promoted to a Generaloberarzt (Res.) (Physician-General of the Reserve) in 1922.

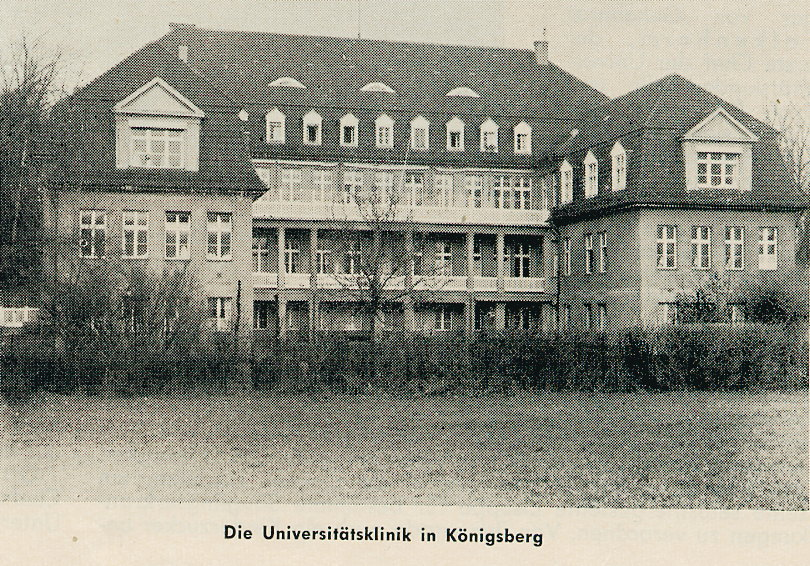
Königsberg's pediatric clinic

In 1921 he became the director of the pediatric section of the university hospital. Falkenheim retired in 1926.

Falkenheim was also active in the Jewish congregation of Königsberg and the founder of the local section of the Centralverein deutscher Staatsbürger jüdischen Glaubens (Central Association of German Citizens of Jewish Faith) in 1908. In 1928 he became the Chairman of the Jewish congregation of Königsberg and managed to organize the flight of a large number of Jewish Königsbergers. Falkenheim himself emigrated via Spain and Cuba to the United States in October 1941 just before the remaining Jews were deported and killed in the Holocaust in June 1942.

Falkenheim was married to Margarethe née Caro and died in Rochester, N.Y. in 1945.
