= Martha Harpf =

German businesswoman (1874–1942)

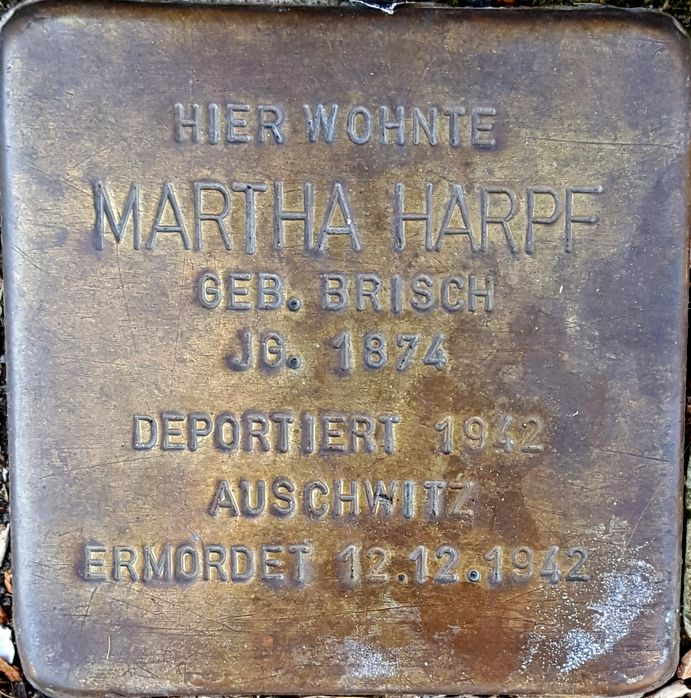
Stumbling stone for Martha Harpf in Wiesbaden

Martha Harpf (née Brisch; 7 April 1874 in Graudenz – 12 December 1942 in Auschwitz concentration camp) was a German businesswoman and politician (DDP, SPD) who was a victim of The Holocaust.

== Biography ==
Martha Brisch was the eldest daughter of a Jewish religious teacher. In 1890, at the age of 16, she married the Protestant musician Hans Harpf from Königsberg against her family's wishes and became non-religious. In the following years, the couple lived in Lübeck, Mainz, and Cologne, where Martha Harpf founded her own business for the placement of domestic servants in 1892. In 1896, the family moved to Königsberg, and Hans Harpf took over his father's music business. The company was granted the Electrola general agency for East Prussia. Martha Harpf was the mother of three daughters.

Martha Harpf was a women's rights activist and initially belonged to the German Democratic Party (DDP) before switching to the Social Democratic Party (SPD). After the November Revolution, she served as a city councillor for the DDP in Königsberg from 1918, later for the SPD. From 1921 to 1925, she was a member of the Provincial Parliament of East Prussia, representing the Königsberg (Königsberg-Stadt) constituency and the SPD.

After the Nazis seized power, Martha Harpf came under scrutiny from the new regime because of both her political activism and her Jewish heritage. Her business was boycotted and was later forced to close. The Harpfs moved to Wiesbaden, where Hans Harpf died in 1935. In September 1942, she was arrested and taken to the police prison in Wiesbaden. She was later deported to Auschwitz, where she died on 12 December 1942.

== See also ==
- List of Stolpersteine (stumbling stones) in Wiesbaden-Southeast

== Sources ==
- Norbert Korfmacher: Vorläufiges Mitgliederverzeichnis des ostpreußischen Provinziallandtages 1919 bis 1933, 2018, S. 22, Digitalisat
- Biographie
