= Aryeh Leib Epstein =

Polish rabbi

Aryeh Löb ben Mordecai Ha-Levi Epstein (Ba'al ha-Pardes) (1708 – June 26, 1775) was a Polish rabbi born in Grodno. At first he refused to become a rabbi, preferring to devote himself entirely to study, but in 1739 he was forced by poverty to accept the rabbinate of Brestovech, Lithuania, and in 1745 he became rabbi of Königsberg, where he remained until his death. He corresponded with Elijah, Gaon of Vilna, and with Jonathan Eybeschütz, with whom he sided in the quarrel about amulets (see Emden-Eybeschütz Controversy).

He is the author of Or ha-Shanim, on the 613 commandments (Frankfurt-on-the-Oder, 1754), Halakah Aḥaronah and Ḳunṭres ha-Ra'yot (ib. 1754; Königsberg, 1759), Sefer ha-Pardes, in three parts: (1) on the Shema and the observance of Shabbat, (2) sermons, (3) funeral orations (ib. 1759). Several other Kabbalistic and halachic works from his pen are mentioned in his own works or by his biographer. A prayer which he composed on the occasion of the dedication of a new synagogue in Königsberg (ib. 1756) is found in the Bodleian Library. Annotations by him and by his son Abraham Meïr Epstein are published in some of the later editions of the Babylonian Talmud. He is called "Levin Marcus" in Solowicz's Gesch. der Juden in Königsberg, Posen, 1857.

== Jewish Encyclopedia bibliography ==
- Epstein, Geburot Ari, Warsaw, 1870;
- Joseph Zedner, Cat. Hebr. Books Brit. Mus. p. 241;
- Friedenstein, Ir Gibborim, pp. 44, 47, Vilna, 1880;
