= Ferdinand Falkson =

German physician

Ferdinand Falkson (20 August 1820 – 31 August 1900) was a German physician and political writer. Born in Königsberg, and studied at the universities of Königsberg, Berlin, and Halle, earning his M.D. from Königsberg in 1843. In the same year he engaged in practice in his native city. In 1844, he was appointed physician to the poor of the Jewish community, a position which he held until his death.

In 1845 Falkson was betrothed to a Christian, but being unable to obtain in his own country the necessary permission to marry, he went to England, and was married there in 1846. On his return to Königsberg in the same year, he was accused of violating the state laws. The case occupied the courts for three years, and was finally won by Falkson (1849). He was active in politics, and at the time of his death was senior of the chamber of aldermen in Königsberg.

== Works ==
- Aktenstücke Meines Eheprocesses (1845, 1847)
- Gemischte Ehen Zwischen Juden und Christen Altona (1845)
- Die Emancipation der Juden und die Emancipation der Denkenden (ib. 1845)
- Giordano Bruno (1846)
- Memoiren (1840–48) (1888)
- Reisebilder (1890)
