= Markus Herz =

German philosopher (1747–1803)

Hofrat (Waldeck and Pyrmont) Markus Herz
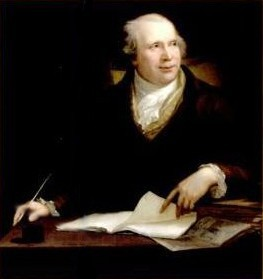
- Portrait by Friedrich Georg Weitsch
- Born: 17 January 1747; Berlin, Prussia
- Died: 19 January 1803 (aged 56); Berlin, Prussia
- Other name: Marcus Herz
- Spouse: Henriette Herz

Education
- Education: University of Königsberg; University of Halle
- Academic advisor: Immanuel Kant

Philosophical work
- Era: 18th-century philosophy
- Region: Western philosophy
- School: Enlightenment philosophy Kantianism
- Main interests: Natural philosophy, metaphysics
- Notable ideas: Application of Kantian categories to physiology

Markus Herz (/hɜːrts/; German: [hɛʁts]; 17 January 1747 – 19 January 1803) was a German Jewish physician and lecturer on philosophy.

== Biography ==
Born in Berlin to very poor parents, Herz was destined for a mercantile career, and in 1762 went to Königsberg, Prussia. He soon gave up his position as clerk and attended the University of Königsberg, becoming a pupil of Immanuel Kant, but was obliged to discontinue his studies for want of means. He thereupon became secretary to the wealthy Russian Ephraim, travelling with him through the Baltic Provinces.

On 21 August 1770, he travelled from Berlin and acted as respondent when Kant presented his inaugural dissertation at the University of Königsberg for the post of ordinary professor. In 1770 he had returned to Germany and studied medicine at Halle, where he became a Doctor of Medicine in 1774, in which year he established himself in Berlin, being appointed physician at the Jewish hospital. Beginning in 1777, he delivered public lectures on medicine and philosophy, which were well attended by the students and the principal personages of the Prussian capital. At some of them even members of the royal family were present.

Herz married Henriette de Lemos in 1779 and their house was for a long time the meeting place of Berlin's political, artistic, scientific, and literary intellectuals such as Friedrich Schleiermacher, Friedrich Schlegel, and the young Alexander von Humboldt. In 1782 he became ill through overstudy, and had to give up his lectures until 1785, when a sojourn in Bad Pyrmont restored his health.

In 1791, he received the Prussian royal title of Professor of Philosophy (Professorentitel für Philosophie) and that of Hofrat of Waldeck and Pyrmont, but lectured only for a few years, giving most of his time to his medical practice. Herz was a friend and pupil of Moses Mendelssohn, and was also well acquainted with Lessing. For many years, Herz corresponded with Kant and their letters are considered to be of great philosophical importance.

Herz died in Berlin.

== Views ==
Compulsory vaccination was strongly condemned by Herz, and in 1801 he wrote an open letter on the subject to Wilhelm Friedrich Domeier or Dohmeyer, under the heading "Ueber die Brutalimpfung" ("About Brutal Vaccination").

== Works ==
Herz was the author of:

- Betrachtungen aus der Spekulativen Weltweisheit, Königsberg, 1771;
- Freimüthige Kaffeegespräche Zweier Jüdischer Zuschauerinnen über den Juden Pinkus, Berlin, 1772, a satirical essay;
- Versuch über die Ursachen der Verschiedenheit des Geschmacks (or Versuch über den Geschmack), Mitau, 1776;
- Briefe an Aerzte, Berlin, 1777–84;
- Grundriss der Medizinischen Wissenschaften, ib. 1782;
- Versuch über den Schwindel, ib. 1786, 2d ed. 1791, an important study;
- Grundlage zu den Vorlesungen über die Experimental-Physik, ib. 1787;
- Ein Sendschreiben an die Redaktion der Meassefim über das zu Frühe Beerdigen der Todten bei den Juden, ib. 1789.

== Sources ==
- R. J. Wunderbar, in Der Orient, Leipzig, 30 June 1849, pp. 408 et seq
- Ludwig Geiger, in Allg. Deutsche Biographie, 1880, xii. 261 et seq.;
- Oesterreichische Wochenschrift, 23 January 1903, pg. 59
