= Epstein =

- Pronunciation: /ˈɛpstaɪn/, /-stiːn/

Origin
- Language: Yiddish
- Origin: Eppstein, Germany

Other names
- Variant form: Eppstein
- Derivatives: Epshteyn, Epshtayn, Epshtein

The surname Epstein (also Eppstein or Epshtein) (Note: Hebrew: אפשטיין, romanized: Epshtein, pronounced [ˈʔepʃtaɪn]; Yiddish: עפּשטײן, romanized: Epshteyn, pronounced [ˈɛpʃtejn]) is one of the oldest Ashkenazi Jewish family names. It is most likely derived from the German town of Eppstein, in Hesse; the place-name was probably derived from Gaulish apa 'water' (in the sense of a river) and German -stein 'stone' (in the sense of a hill).

== Perception of the surname ==
The Jewish Encyclopedia from 1906 noted that "the number of individual Epsteins who have achieved prominence is [...] large." According to The Spectator contributor Angela Epstein, the name became infamous in the 21st century following the revelation of the sex crimes of financier Jeffrey Epstein, although it had previously a more positive association with the music manager Brian Epstein and the sculptor Jacob Epstein. The Boston Globe columnist Alex Beam dubbed the bearers of the surname "magnificent, accomplished, and nefarious", associating the name with people such as Brian, Jeffrey, columnist Joseph, the screenwriter twins Philip and Julius, married editors Jason and Barbara, Rabbi Mendel, and journalist Edward Jay Epstein, among others. Association of the name with Jeffrey Epstein has caused media attention for unrelated people with similar names, such as local American politicians Geoff Epstein and Harvey Epstein.

== Pronunciation ==
The name is pronounced in its original Yiddish and German as [ˈɛpʃtaɪ̯n]. In English, the pronunciation is either /ˈɛpstaɪn/ or /ˈɛpstiːn/. In French, the name is pronounced either [ɛpstɛn] or [ɛpʃtɛn], except in reference to Americans such as Jeffrey Epstein, in which case it is pronounced [ɛpstin].

== Arts ==
- Abby Epstein, American documentary director and producer
- Alex Epstein (writer) (born 1963), American Canadian writer and film producer
- Alex Epstein (born 1971), Israeli writer
- Alvin Epstein (1925–2018), American actor and director
- Asaf Epstein (born 1978), Israeli film director, writer, and producer
- Barbara Epstein (1928–2006), American literary editor
- Benita Epstein, American cartoonist
- Brett Epstein (born 1978), American musician, songwriter, and record producer
- Daniel Epstein (pianist) (born 1946), American pianist
- Daniel Mark Epstein (born 1948), American biographer and poet
- David Epstein (conductor) (1930–2002), American composer, conductor, and music scientist
- Deborah Epstein (born 1984), French-American singer-songwriter more commonly known as SoShy
- Dorrit Epstein (1917–2014), Czech British graphic designer
- Elisabeth Epstein (1879–1956), Russian painter
- Emily Rose Epstein, American drummer
- Freyda Epstein (1956–2003), American folk musician
- Gustav von Epstein (1828–1879), commissioned the Palais Epstein.
- Győző Epstein (1879–1945), Hungarian sculptor, graphic artist, and painter
- Hadassah Spira Epstein (1909–1992), American dancer
- Howie Epstein (1955–2003), American bass guitarist
- Jacob Epstein (1880–1959), American-British sculptor
- Jacob Epstein (writer), American television writer
- Jake Epstein (born 1987), Canadian actor
- Jason Epstein (1928–2022), American publisher who popularized the trade paperback
- Jean Epstein (1897–1953), French filmmaker
- Jennifer Cody Epstein, American novelist
- Jerome Epstein (director) (1922–1991), American filmmaker
- Josh Epstein, Canadian actor, producer and writer
- Joshua Epstein (violinist) (born 1940), Israeli musician
- Julius Epstein (1832–1926), Croatian pianist
- Julius J. Epstein (1909–2000), American screenwriter, brother of Philip G. Epstein
- June Epstein (1918–2004), Australian author, radio broadcaster, musician, and disability advocate
- Kalama Epstein (born 2000), American actor
- Kathie Lee Epstein (born 1953), maiden name of Kathie Lee Gifford, American television host
- Kathleen Epstein (1901–1979), American-British sculptor
- Lawrence J. Epstein (born 1946), American author
- Leslie Epstein (1938–2025), American novelist and essayist
- Marie Epstein (1899–1995), Polish-French actress and film preservationist
- Marti Epstein (born 1959), American composer
- Mel Epstein (1910–1994), American film director and producer
- Michael J. Epstein (born 1976), American filmmaker and musician
- Mitch Epstein (born 1952), American photographer
- Nicky Epstein, American knitting designer and author
- Peter Epstein (born 1967), American jazz saxophonist
- Philip G. Epstein (1909–1952), American Oscar-winning screenwriter, brother to Julius J. Epstein
- Rob Epstein (born 1955), American director
- Robin Epstein, American artist
- Sadie Kuttner Epstein (1883–1973), American concert singer
- Selma Epstein (1927–2014), American concert pianist
- Steven Epstein (music producer), U.S. classical music producer with Sony
- Ted Epstein, American drummer
- Temi Epstein (born 1975), American child actress
- Zale "Zalezy" Epstein, Canadian songwriter and musician

== Business ==
- Betty Halff-Epstein (1905–1991), Swiss entrepreneur and second-wave feminist
- Brian Epstein (1934–1967), businessman, manager of the Beatles
- Jacob Epstein (art collector) (1864–1945), Lithuanian-American merchant, philanthropist, and art collector
- Jacob Epstein (banker) (1771–1843), Polish banker and philanthropist
- Jeffrey Epstein (1953–2019), American financier and convicted child sex offender
- Mark Epstein (property developer) (born 1954), American property developer and brother of Jeffrey Epstein

== Mathematics ==
- Bernard Epstein (1920–2005), American mathematician and physicist
- Charles Epstein (mathematician), American applied mathematician
- David Eppstein (born 1963), British-American computer scientist and mathematician
- David B. A. Epstein (born 1937), British mathematician
- Lenore Epstein (born 1942), birth name of Lenore Blum, computer scientist and mathematician
- Lenore A. Epstein (1914–1994), American statistician
- Paul Epstein (1871–1939), German mathematician
- Paul Sophus Epstein (1883–1966), American mathematician/physicist of Polish/Russian origin and California Institute of Technology professor.
- Richard Arnold Epstein (1927–2016), American mathematician and game theorist

== Military ==
- Giora Epstein (1938–2025), "ace of aces" Israeli fighter pilot
- Joseph Epstein (1911–1944), communist French resistance leader

== Religion ==
- Abraham Epstein (born 1841), Russo-Austrian rabbinical scholar
- Aryeh Leib Epstein (1708–1775), Polish rabbi
- Baruch Epstein (1860–1941), Lithuanian rabbi and the son of Yechiel Michel Epstein
- Ephraim Epstein (1876–1960), American Orthodox rabbi
- Greg Epstein (born 1977), Humanist rabbi and chaplain
- Haim Fishel Epstein (1874–1942), Lithuanian-American rabbi
- Isidore Epstein (1894–1962), English rabbi and rabbinical scholar
- Jehiel Michel Epstein, 17th-century writer and ethicist
- Klonimus Kalman Epstein (1753–1825), Polish rabbi, Kabbalist and a leader of the Chassidic movement
- Marc Michael Epstein, American religious scholar
- Mendel Epstein, American rabbi and kidnapper, also known as "The Prodfather"
- Moshe Mordechai Epstein (1866–1933), rabbi and author of the Levush Mordechai
- Moshe Yechiel Epstein (1889–1971), Hasidic rabbi and Israel Prize recipient
- Yechiel Michel Epstein (1829–1908), Lithuanian rabbi and author of the Arukh HaShulkhan
- Yitzchak Eizik Epstein (1770–1857), Chabad-Lubavitch rabbi and scholar
- Zelik Epstein (1914–2009), Rosh Yeshiva of the Shaar HaTorah-Grodno Yeshiva, located in Kew Gardens, New York

== Science and medicine ==
- Alan H. Epstein (born 1949), American aeronautical engineer
- Alois Epstein (1849–1918), Czech pediatrician
- Anthony Epstein (1921–2024), British pathologist and academic
- Arnold Epstein, American health scholar
- Berthold Epstein (1890–1962), Czech pediatrician and professor
- Charles Epstein (geneticist) (1933–2011), American geneticist and Unabomber victim
- Claire Epstein (1911–2000), Israeli archaeologist
- Edward Epstein (meteorologist) (1931–2008), American developer of statistical weather forecasting
- Fred Epstein (1937–2006), American pediatric neurosurgeon
- Gerald Epstein (1935–2019), American psychiatrist
- Isadore Epstein (1919–1995), American astronomer
- Joshua M. Epstein, American epidemiologist
- Margaret J. Eppstein, American scholar
- Mark Epstein (born 1953), American psychotherapist
- Martha C. Epstein (1927–2003), American geneticist
- Robert Epstein (born 1953), American psychologist
- Robert M. Epstein (1928–2024), American anesthesiologist
- Rose Frisch (Rose Epstein Frisch, 1918–2015), American biologist
- Russell Epstein, American psychologist
- Samuel Epstein (physician) (1926–2018), American doctor and professor of environmental medicine
- Samuel Epstein (geochemist) (1919–2001), Canadian-American geochemist
- Slava Epstein, American marine biologist and microbial ecologist
- Stephen Epstein (cardiologist), American cardiologist and medical researcher

== Social sciences ==
- Alek Epstein (born 1975), Russian-Israeli sociologist
- Bill Epstein (1924–1999), British social anthropologist
- Brian Epstein (philosopher), American philosopher
- Cynthia Fuchs Epstein, American sociologist
- Fritz T. Epstein (1898–1979), American historian
- Gene Epstein (born 1944), American economist
- Larry G. Epstein, Canadian economist
- Mikhail Epstein (born 1950), Russian-American literary theorist and Emory University professor
- Paul Eppstein (1902–1944), German sociologist and Holocaust victim
- Ron Epstein (born 1942), American scholar and translator
- Simon Epstein (born 1947), Israeli economist and historian
- Stephan R. Epstein (1960–2007), British economic historian
- Steven Epstein (academic), American sociologist
- T. Scarlett Epstein (1922–2014), British-Austrian social anthropologist and economist

== Sport ==
- Andrew Epstein (born 1996), American soccer player
- Charlotte Epstein (1884–1938), American swimming coach
- Denis Epstein (born 1986), German football player
- Dmitry Epstein (born 1993), Dutch pair skater
- Eddie Epstein, baseball statistician
- Esther Epstein (born 1954), American chess player
- Hayden Epstein (born 1980), American NFL football player
- Jan Epstein (1918–1988), Australian cricketer
- Kurt Epstein (1904–1975), Czech water polo player
- Mike Epstein, (born 1943), American major league baseball player
- Nikolay Epshtein (1919–2005), Soviet ice hockey coach
- Ray Epstein (born 1959), Australian Paralympic weightlifter and powerlifting coach
- Theo Epstein (born 1973), American Major League Baseball executive

== Politics and law ==
- Anthony C. Epstein (born 1952), American jurist
- Benjamin Epstein (1912–1983), Anti-Defamation League director
- Daniel Z. Epstein (born 1983), American lawyer
- David G. Epstein, American law professor
- Eliahu Epstein (1903–1990), birth name of Eliahu Eilat, Israeli diplomat and orientalist
- Eric Epstein, American political activist
- Geoff Epstein (born 1947), Australian-American politician
- Gloria Epstein, Canadian judge
- Harvey Epstein (born 1967), American politician
- Howard Epstein (born 1949), Canadian politician
- Jerome Epstein (politician) (1937–2025), American politician and criminal
- Lee Epstein (born 1958), American political scientist
- Leon Epstein (1919–2006), American political scientist
- Leopold Vail Epstein (1910–1991), American attorney and father of Linda McCartney
- Mitzi Epstein, American politician
- Moses J. Epstein (c. 1911–1960), American politician
- Philip Michael Epstein (born 1942), Canadian family law lawyer
- Richard Epstein (born 1943), American law professor
- Samuel Epstein (politician) (1890–1951), American politician, lawyer, and physician
- William Epstein (1912–2001), Canadian international civil servant

== Writing and journalism ==
- Alan Epstein (1949–2016), American travel writer
- Alex Epstein (born 1980), American author
- David Epstein (journalist), American journalist
- Dena Epstein (1916–2013), American music librarian, writer, and musicologist
- Edward Jay Epstein (1935–2024), American author and early critic of the Warren Commission
- Eleni Epstein (1925–1991), American fashion journalist
- Helen Epstein (born 1947), American author and memoirist
- Helen Epstein (journalist) (born 1961), American journalist and professor
- Israel Epstein (1915–2005), Polish-Chinese journalist
- Joseph Epstein (born 1937), American editor and essayist
- Julius Epstein (writer) (1901–1975), American journalist and scholar
- Lewis Carroll Epstein, American author
- Louise Epstein (born 1965), Swedish journalist and author
- Melech Epstein (1889–1979), American journalist and historian
- Nadine Epstein, American journalist and author
- Randi Hutter Epstein (born 1962), American medical writer, author and journalist
- Shakne Epshtein (1883–1945), Soviet journalist

== Other ==
- David Epstein (Australia) (born 1963), Australian public affairs specialist
- David Epstein (gangster), former member of Epstein–Wolmark gang, son of Mendel Epstein
- Gabriel Epstein (1918–2017), British architect and urban planner
- Hedy Epstein (1924–2016), Jewish anti-Zionist
- Jacob Epstein (spy) (1903–1998), American alleged Soviet intelligence agent
- Ruth Wilson Epstein (1906–1996), American nurse and wife of Jacob Epstein (spy)
- Seraphine Eppstein (1861–1942), American clubwoman and hospital administrator
- Sorella Epstein (1931–1941), Latvian Holocaust victim
- Yishaq Epstein (1862–1943), Hebrew linguist and educator

== Fictional characters ==
- Juan Epstein, fictional character on the TV series Welcome Back, Kotter
- Dov Epstein, fictional character on the TV series Rookie Blue
- Solomon Epstein, inventor of the Epstein-Fusion Drive in the novel and TV series The Expanse

== Variant surnames ==
- Katja Ebstein (born 1945), German singer
- Richard Ebstein (born 1943), American behavioral geneticist
- Wilhelm Ebstein (1836–1912), German physician and nutritionist
- Nikolay Epshtein (1918–2005), Soviet ice hockey coach
- Shakne Epshtein (1883–1945), Soviet journalist
- Alex Epshteyn, computer programmer
- Boris Epshteyn (born 1982), political commentator

== See also ==
- Eppstein, town in Hesse, Germany
- Lords of Eppstein, family of Germany nobility
- "Le château d'Eppstein", story by Alexandre Dumas
- Ebstein's anomaly
- Epstein–Barr virus
- Palais Epstein in Vienna
- The Epstein School, a private Jewish-day school in Atlanta
- Epstein Hebrew Academy, a private Jewish day-school in St. Louis
- Epstein Brothers Orchestra, American Klezmer quartet
- Epstein files, documents on Jeffrey Epstein and his affiliates
