= Ebstein =

Ebstein is a surname. Notable people with this surname include:

- Katja Ebstein (born 1945), German singer
- Richard Ebstein (born 1943), American behavioral geneticist
- Wilhelm Ebstein (1836–1912), German physician

== See also ==
- Epstein
