= Jacob Epstein (disambiguation) =

Jacob Epstein (1880–1959) was an American-British sculptor.

Jacob or Jake Epstein may also refer to:

- Jacob Epstein (art collector) (1864–1945), Lithuanian-American merchant, philanthropist, and art collector
- Jacob Epstein (banker) (1771–1843), Polish banker
- Jacob Epstein (spy) (1903–1998), Russian-American student and alleged Soviet agent
- Jake Epstein, Canadian actor
- Jacob Epstein (writer)
