= Samuel Epstein =

Samuel Epstein may refer to:

- Samuel Epstein (physician)
- Samuel Epstein (geochemist)
- Samuel Epstein (politician)
