= Robert Epstein (disambiguation) =

Robert or Rob Epstein may refer to:

- Rob Epstein (born 1955), American filmmaker
- Robert Epstein (born 1953), American psychologist and journalist
- Robert M. Epstein (1928–2024), American anesthesiologist
