= Henry Coston =

French anti-Semitic journalist conspiracy theorist

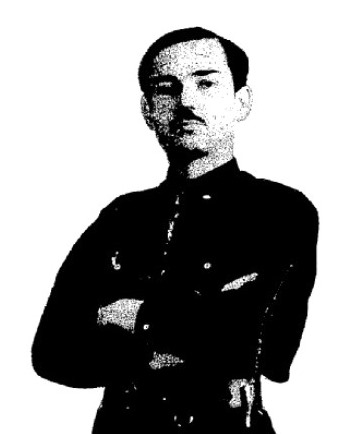
- Coston in 1934
- Born: 20 December 1910; Paris, France
- Died: 26 July 2001 (aged 90); Caen, Normandy, France
- Occupation: Journalist

Henry Coston (20 December 1910 – 26 July 2001) was a French far-right, antisemitic journalist, collaborationist and conspiracy theorist.

== Biography ==
After joining the Action française, Coston was influenced by journalist Édouard Drumont and took over his newspaper La Libre Parole (an antisemitic paper well-known during the Dreyfus affair) in the 1930s. He had previously learned his trade editing La France Ouvrière with Henry Charbonneau. At the same time he created an "Anti-Jewish Youth" organisation "which campaigned for the exclusion of Jews from French life." In the run-up to World War II, he was also in close touch with Ulrich Fleischhauer, German publisher of an internationally distributed anti-Jewish propaganda newsletter, the Welt-Dienst / World-Service / Service Mondial.

During World War II, Coston belonged to Jacques Doriot's fascist PPF. He also was vice-president of the "Association of anti-Jewish Journalists" and he organised the publication of one of the most antisemitic document of the Vichy regime, a tract entitled "I hate you" (Je vous hais). At the same period, he also wrote anti-Masonic pamphlets with his colleague Jacques Ploncard d'Assac.

In 1944, he tried to escape in Austria, but he was captured and sentenced to hard labour for life. He was pardoned in 1952 for illness and served only five years. He began writing again, mainly against free-masonry while he kept on denouncing the influence of Jews in French life.

Until the 1990s he was contributing to different far-right newspapers, sometimes using aliases such as Georges Virebeau. He was a supporter of the Front National and occasionally wrote in its paper National-Hebdo. From 1967 to 2000, Coston wrote a five-volume Dictionary of French politics (Dictionnaire de la politique française), which is considered as "exactly referenced" and "a non-negligible source of information" by the Jewish historian Simon Epstein.
