= The Soho Forum =

Monthly libertarian debate series

The Soho Forum is a debate society that holds debates on a wide-array of libertarian-centric topics.

Gene Epstein is the Director and Moderator of the Forum which has held debates on controversial issues such as sex work, Bitcoin, illegal drugs, and other topics.

== History ==
Reason Magazine published the first Soho Forum debate in November 2016. It was a debate between Nick Gillespie, Reason's editor-in-chief, versus Walter Block, a prominent Austrian economist, over the resolution, "Should Libertarians Vote for Trump?" The Forum has been exclusively moderated by Gene Epstein, a former economics editor of Barron's.

The Forum uses the Oxford-style debate method by which before the debate begins, the moderator asks the audience to cast their vote on the debate resolution. Immediately following the end of the debate, the audience shares their final vote and the side with the greater percentage change between the first and second vote wins the debate.

The debates are regularly published to Reason, C-Span, as well as to the Forum's YouTube and Spotify.

== See also ==
- War on drugs
- Israeli–Palestinian conflict
