= Yeshivat Kadimah High School =

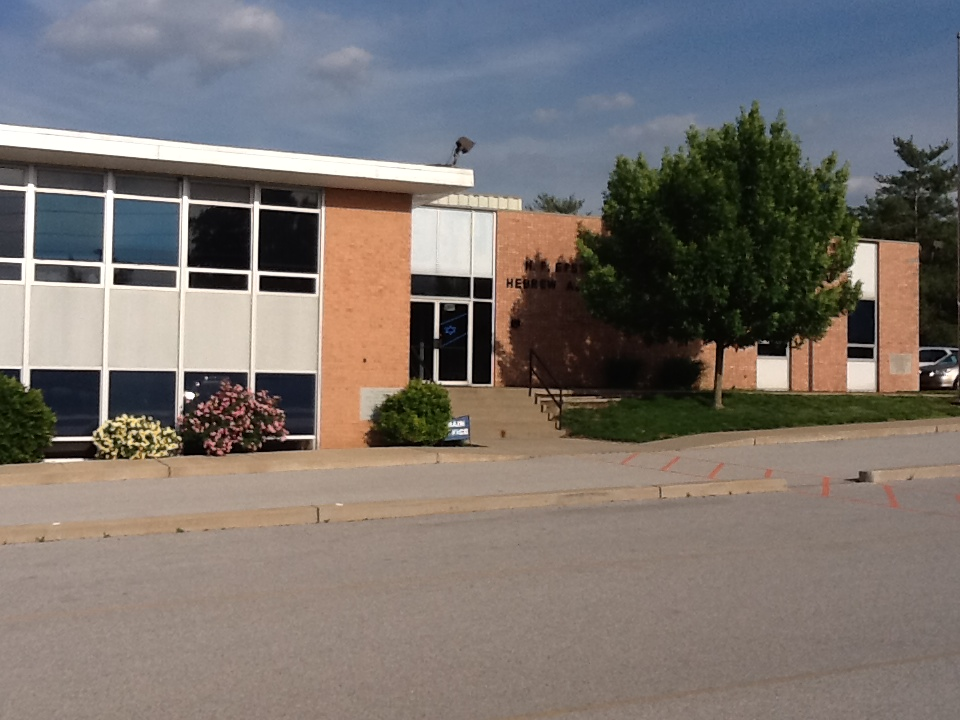
- University City, Missouri

Information
- Type: private
- Religious affiliation: Modern Orthodox Judaism
- Established: 2013
- Dean: Rabbi Moshe Shulman
- Principal: Rabbi Daniel Freund
- Educational director: Dr. Brad Heger
- Faculty: 23
- Grades: 9–12
- Enrollment: 30 (2017)
- Accreditation: AdvancED

Yeshivat Kadimah High School is a modern Orthodox Jewish high school in University City, Missouri. It opened in August 2013 and offers traditional classroom learning in both Jewish education and secular college preparatory education. All courses are taught by certificated professional educators.

The school had been housed in the building of the Epstein Hebrew Academy (EHA), a Modern Orthodox preschool through middle school, since its inception in 2013 until 2020. In 2020, it moved to a new location in University City with EHA.

The word “Kadimah” in the school’s name means “forward.” The name was chosen to indicate a forward-looking high school, utilizing traditional teacher-guided classrooms, while accepting supportive roles for modern online distance teaching and experiential learning.

== History ==
Yeshivat Kadimah High School was established in June 2013 and is registered with the state of Missouri as a nonprofit 501(c)(3) corporation. The school opened in August 2013 with ten students, and premises in five classrooms and an administrative office at Epstein Hebrew Academy.

The school opened the 2015-2016 academic year with an enrollment of 27 students, and Rabbi Naftali Rothstein assumed the position of Principal, succeeding Rabbi Moshe Shulman, who had helped create the school and had been interim Head of School until Rabbi Rothstein’s appointment.

The school attained the status of a beneficiary agency of Jewish Federation of St. Louis in 2015.

In 2016, the school received accreditation from AdvancED, a non-profit organization recognized by the United States Department of Education that accredits primary and secondary schools throughout the United States and internationally.

== Curriculum and activities ==
The school defines itself as an Orthodox yeshiva high school offering an intensive Torah education from traditional Jewish sources with an emphasis on textual interpretation, ethical conduct and growth in Torah study as a lifelong process, along with a college preparatory program that prepares students as “productive, creative and secure citizens” of a modern technological society.

In addition to traditional classroom instruction by resident teachers for Judaic studies, a class in Tanakh and another in Jewish History and Contemporary Jewish Issues is delivered by instructors from Israel via Skype.

The school offers traditional classroom learning for core classes, and encourages and supports students who may choose to take an occasional high interest elective course online through the University of Missouri, or other accredited agencies. Experiential learning plays a large role in the school's offerings.

Certificated classroom teachers offer a full range of secular courses and advanced honors courses, including Mathematics, Biology, Physics, Chemistry, Social Studies, Language Arts, World Languages, Personal Finance, Fine Arts, Robotics, and Health and Physical Education.

The school emphasizes the learning of Modern Hebrew, both as a means to understanding classic Jewish texts and in recognition of its importance to the Jewish people as the language of the modern State of Israel.

The school also offers learning and discovery experiences through field trips and excursions. These have included community service at Project Backpack, the Jewish Food Pantry, the Wild Bird Sanctuary, and visits to the Thomas F. Eagleton United States Courthouse and to the Donald Danforth Plant Science Center, as well as to the Missouri History Museum and the Holocaust Museum in Creve Coeur. In addition, students have benefited from tours of the control tower at Lambert–St. Louis International Airport, the St. Louis Symphony and various professional theater productions.

== Administration ==
Rabbi Moshe Shulman served as interim Head of School from its opening in 2013. Dr. Brad Heger, formerly of the Ladue School District, is the Education Director for General Studies.

Rabbi Naftali Rothstein was principal from 2015 to 2019. Rabbi Daniel Freund was appointed principal in 2019.

The school was initially overseen by a seven-member Board of Directors. In 2015, a twelve-member Board of Directors oversaw the school.

In 2025, Elissa Schachter was appointed to the role as General Studies Academic Coordinator, and D'vorah Miller as Principal.
