= Parahippocampal gyrus =

Grey matter region surrounding the hippocampus

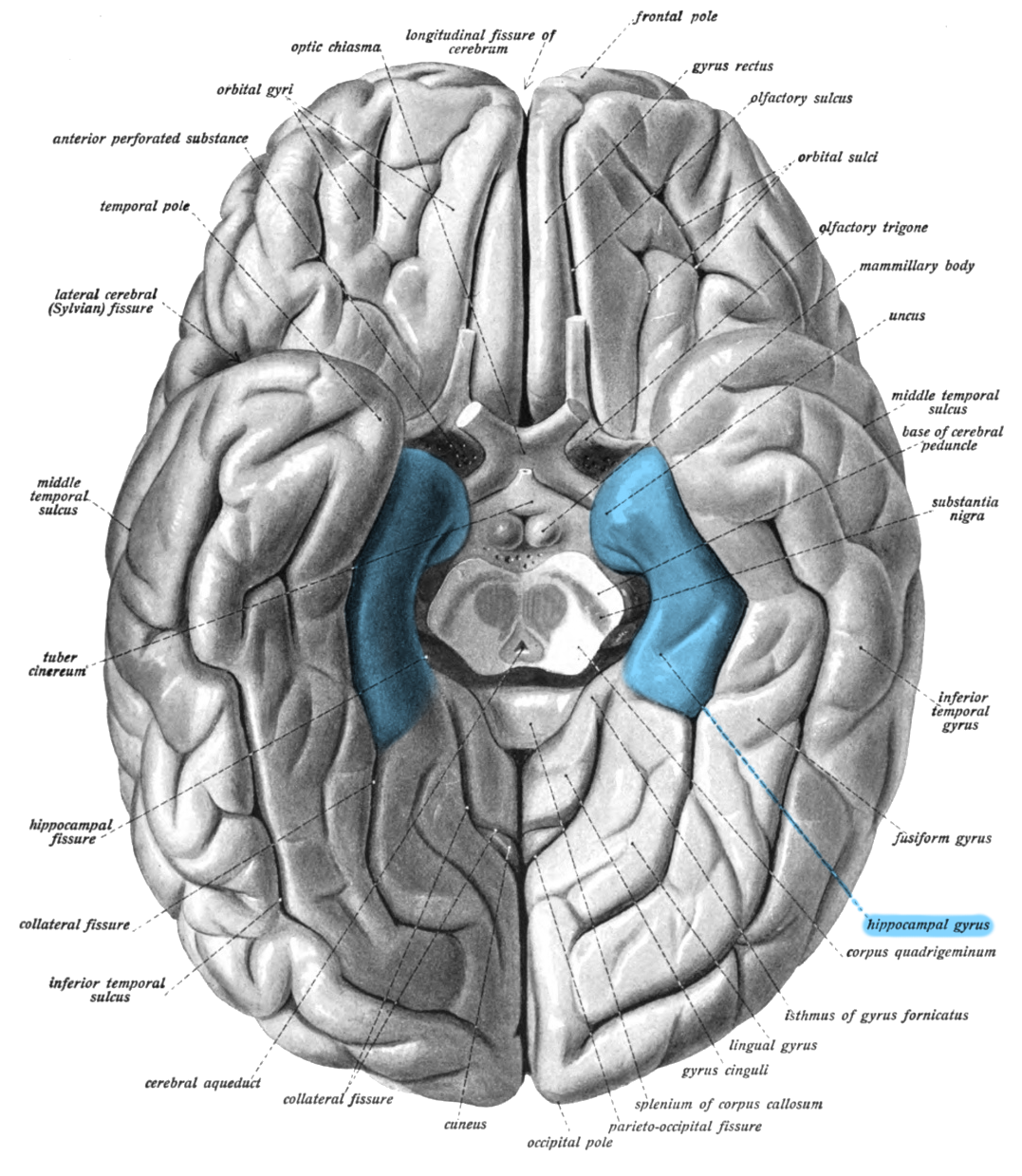
- Human brain seen from below. Parahippocampal gyrus shown in blue

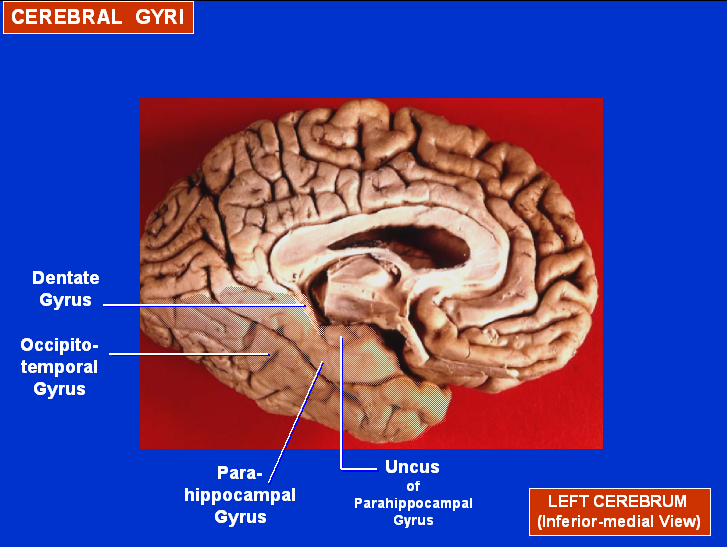
- Medial view of left cerebral hemisphere. Parahippocampal gyrus shown in orange.

Details

Identifiers
- Latin: gyrus parahippocampalis
- MeSH: D020534
- NeuroNames: 164
- NeuroLex ID: birnlex_807
- TA98: A14.1.09.234
- TA2: 5515
- FMA: 61918

The parahippocampal gyrus (or hippocampal gyrus) is a grey matter cortical region, a gyrus of the brain that surrounds the hippocampus and is part of the limbic system. The region plays an important role in memory encoding and retrieval. It has been involved in some cases of hippocampal sclerosis. Asymmetry has been observed in schizophrenia.

== Structure ==
The anterior part of the gyrus includes the perirhinal and entorhinal cortices.

The term parahippocampal cortex is used to refer to an area that encompasses both the posterior parahippocampal gyrus and the medial portion of the fusiform gyrus.

== Function ==
=== Scene recognition ===
The parahippocampal place area (PPA) is a sub-region of the parahippocampal cortex that lies medially in the inferior temporo-occipital cortex. PPA plays an important role in the encoding and recognition of environmental scenes (rather than faces). fMRI studies indicate that this region of the brain becomes highly active when human subjects view topographical scene stimuli such as images of landscapes, cityscapes, or rooms (i.e. images of "places"). Furthermore, according to work by Pierre Mégevand et al. in 2014, stimulation of the region via intracranial electrodes yields intense topographical visual hallucinations of places and situations. The region was first described by Russell Epstein and Nancy Kanwisher in 1998 at MIT, see also other similar reports by Geoffrey Aguirre and Alumit Ishai.

Damage to the PPA (for example, due to stroke) often leads to a syndrome in which patients cannot visually recognize scenes even though they can recognize the individual objects in the scenes (such as people, furniture, etc.). The PPA is often considered the complement of the fusiform face area (FFA), a nearby cortical region that responds strongly whenever faces are viewed, and that is believed to be important for face recognition.

=== Social context ===
Additional research has suggested that the right parahippocampal gyrus in particular has functions beyond the contextualizing of visual background. Tests by a California-based group led by Katherine P. Rankin indicate that the lobe may play a crucial role in identifying social context as well, including paralinguistic elements of verbal communication. For example, Rankin's research suggests that the right parahippocampal gyrus enables people to detect sarcasm.

== Additional images ==
Animation. Parahippocampal gyrus shown red.

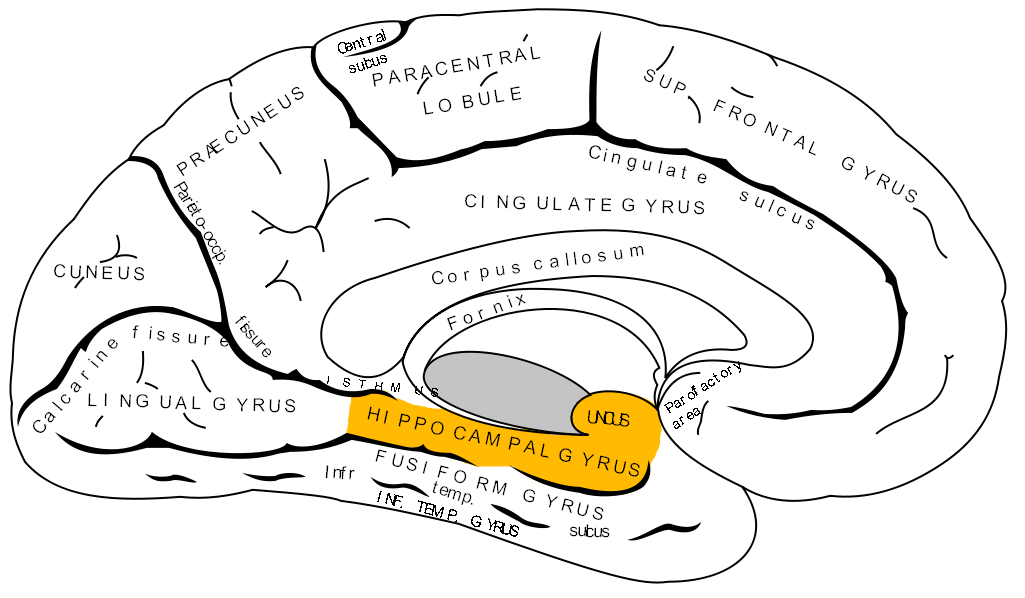
Medial surface of left cerebral hemisphere. Parahippocampal gyrus shown in orange.

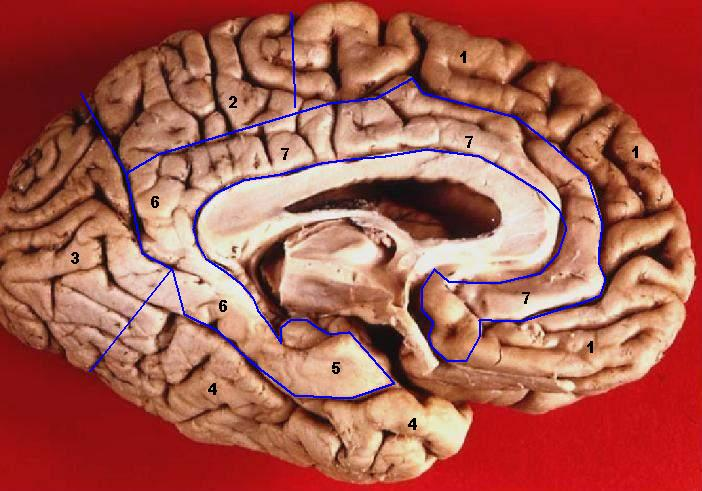
Human brain inferior-medial view. Parahippocampal gyrus labelled as #5

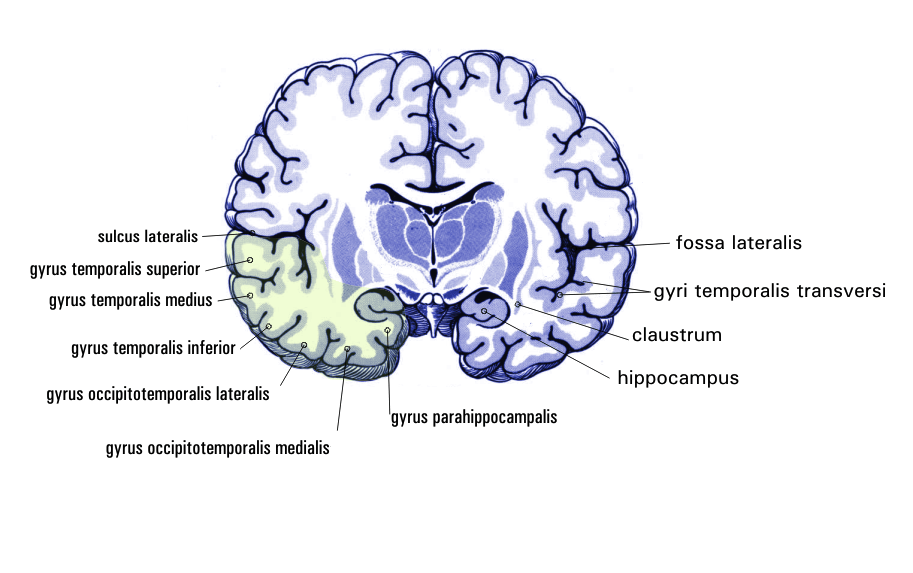
Coronal section. Parahippocampal gyrus labelled at bottom center.

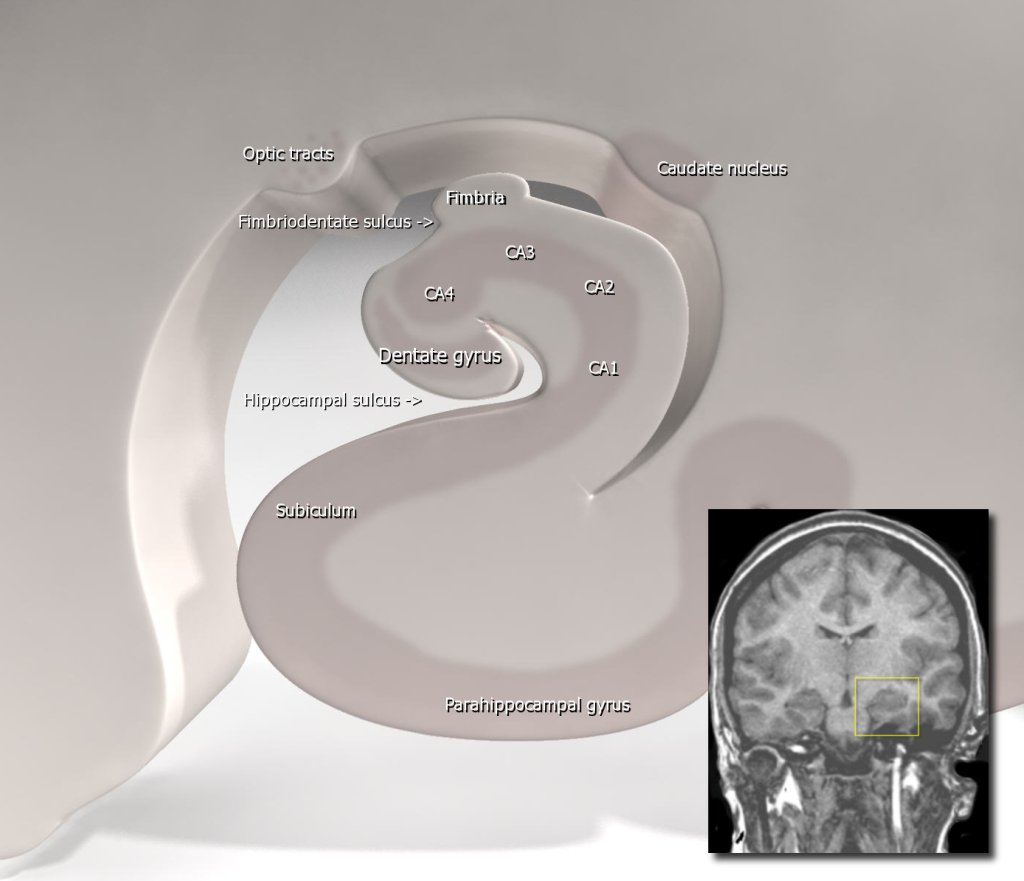
Coronal section of hippocampus. Parahippocampal gyrus labelled at bottom.

Basal view of a human brain.

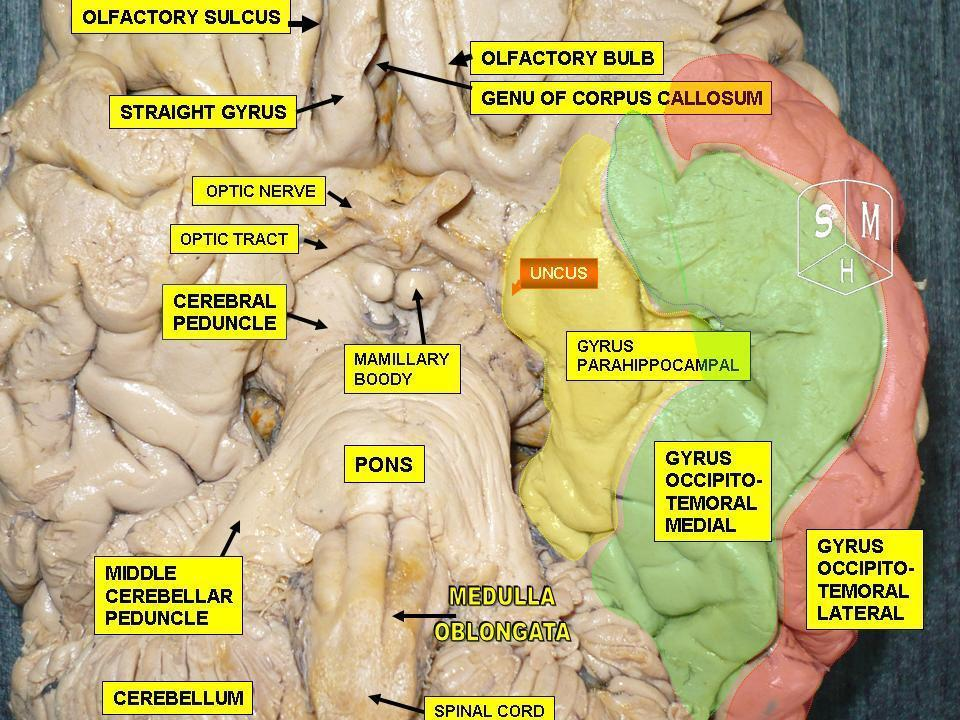
Basal view of a human brain. Parahippocampal gyrus shown in yellow.

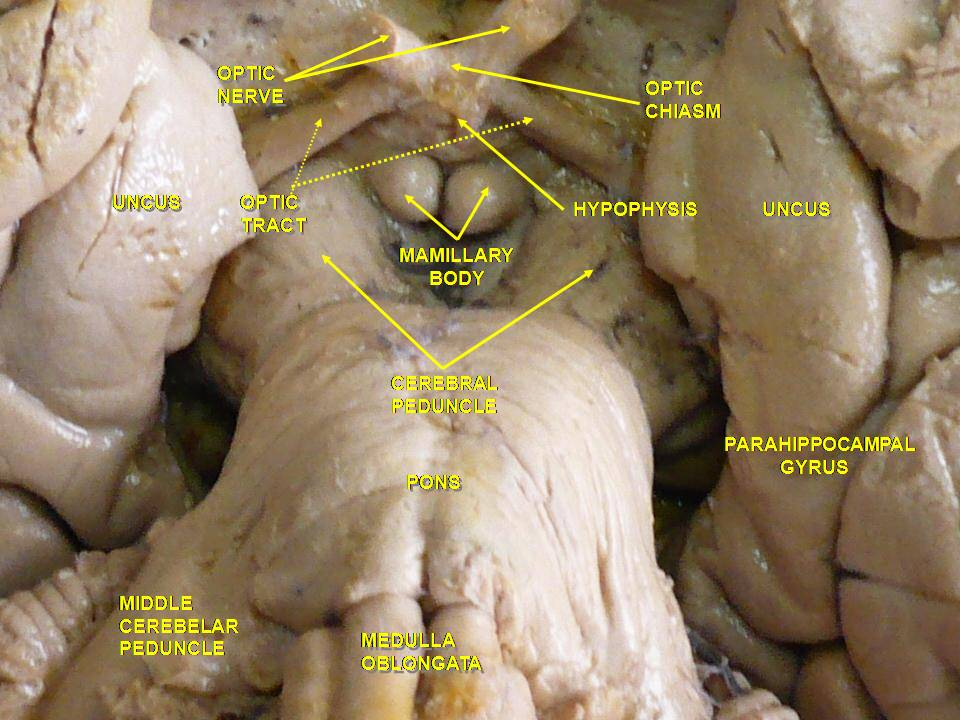
Close up of parahippocampal gyrus.

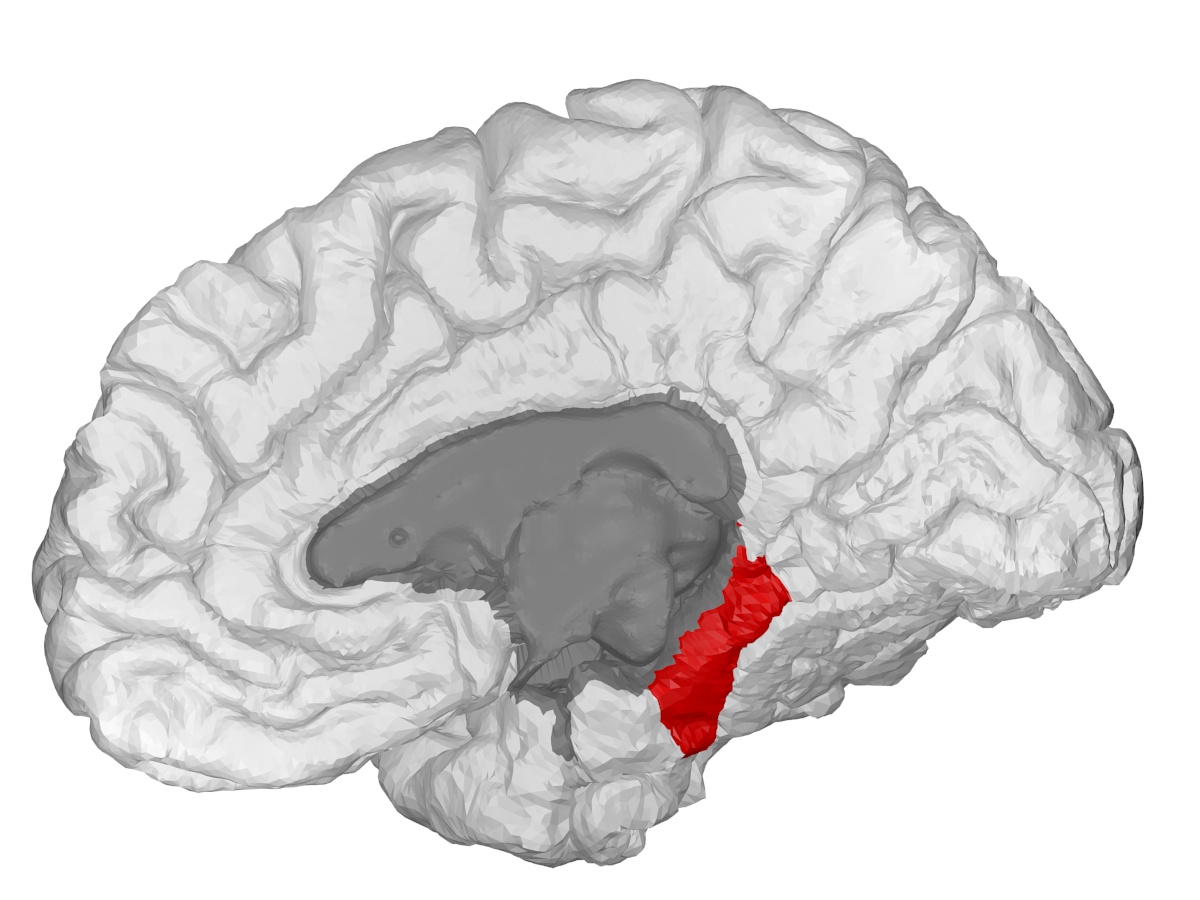
Parahippocampal gyrus, shown in right cerebral hemisphere.

Parahippocampal gyrus highlighted in green on coronal T1 MRI images

Parahippocampal gyrus highlighted in green on sagittal T1 MRI images

Parahippocampal gyrus highlighted in green on transversal T1 MRI images
