= Hayyim Ben Kiki =

Ḥayyim Ben Qīqī
- חיים בן קיקי
- Born: 1887; Tiberias, Ottoman Palestine
- Died: 1935; Aden Province

Ḥayyim Ben Qīqī (Note: also Romanized as Hayyim Ben Kiki) (Hebrew: חיים בן קיקי; 1887–1935) was a Sephardic rabbi and polymath from Tiberias, Ottoman Palestine known for his criticism of European colonialism in West Asia and of European Zionism in Palestine.

== Biography ==
Ḥayyim Ben Qīqī was born in Tiberias, Ottoman Palestine to a distinguished Sephardic family that migrated from Morocco to Palestine in the early 19th century. His father was Rabbi Samuel Ben Qīqī (died 1919), chief rabbi of the rabbinical court of Tiberias. Ḥayyim Ben Qīqī studied at communal schools in Tiberias and acquired proficiency in various languages.

In the early 1920s, he served as the Haifa correspondent for Do'ar HaYom (also known as the Palestine Daily Mail), a Hebrew daily newspaper, while also serving as secretary of the Sephardic Union in Haifa. According to Moshe Behar and Zvi Ben-Dor Benite, his writing, which included lengthy articles, was "clearly polemical, and he often attacked—even ridiculed—political, cultural, and religious movements in the Middle East, whether they were Christian, Muslim, or Jewish."

Ḥayyim Ben Qīqī opposed the Balfour Declaration of 1917. In 1920, he published "Ha-tarbūt ha-ʾēropīt ba-mizrāḥ" (התרבות האירופית במזרח; 'European Culture in the East'), an analysis serialized over four consecutive issues of Do'ar HaYom (12–15 October 1920) on the impact of European cultural imperialism in the region. According to Yuval Evri and Hillel Cohen, Ben Qīqī in this article "presented the Balfour Declaration as a framework that amplified the Jews’ disregard for the Arab inhabitants of the country" and viewed "Zionist enthusiasm for the Balfour Declaration" as "another proof of the European, colonial, and Orientalist character of the Zionist movement".

Responding to Yitzhak Epstein after he published "A Question That Outweighs All Others" 17 August 1921 in Do'ar HaYom, (Note: Building on remarks originally delivered as a speech at the Seventh Zionist Congress in 1905, Epstein raised these criticisms in his 1907 essay "She'ela Ne'elama" (שאלה נעלמה 'An Invisible Question') published in Ha-Shiloaḥ in Odessa.) Ben Qīqī published "Al She’elat ha-She’elot be-Yishuv ha-Aretz" (על שאלת השאלות בישוב הארץ 'The Question of All Questions: Concerning the Settling of the Land') in Do'ar HaYom on 30 August 1921, in which he expanded on Epstein's criticisms of Zionist leaders' policies toward Arabs and ignorance of their language and culture. In "The Question of All Questions," Ben Qīqī did not argue with Epstein's main contentions, but—according to Behar and Ben-Dor Benite—made a self-consciously Sephardic intervention and raised two issues that Epstein had not raised: that Epstein's warning was not original, as local Jewry in Palestine had been making the same warning from the late 19th century but had been regularly ignored, and that the oblivious Zionist attitude toward Arabs was similar to the dismissive attitude of Ashkenazi Zionists toward Arabized Jews, presenting both attitudes as consequences of European yehirut (יהירות 'arrogance').

Ben Qīqī died in Aden Province in 1935 on his way to India on behalf of the rabbis of Tiberias; the details of the circumstances of his mission and death are not definitively known.

== Views ==
Ben Qīqī viewed European culture brought by Ashkenazim as foreign and menacing to Palestine and the broader region and a danger to local Jews and Arabs alike. He felt that Sephardim were at home in Arab culture and in the Arab world. Ben Qīqī also criticized the European Zionist leadership for their condescending attitude toward local Jewry, describing it as typified by yehirut (יהירות 'arrogance').

Ben Qīqī blamed British Zionism for having brought an end to the Ottoman institution of the Hakham Bashi, the religious leader of the Jewish community in the Ottoman period. He called for its reinstitution, believing a Sephardic Hakham Bashi would increase cooperation with the Patriarch and Mufti—positions which remained in British-ruled Palestine.
