= Posterior parahippocampal gyrus =

Portion of the parahippocampal gyrus.

Details

Identifiers
- Latin: pars posterior gyri parahippocampalis
- NeuroLex ID: birnlex_1295

The posterior parahippocampal gyrus is a portion of the parahippocampal gyrus.

It can show deterioration in Alzheimer's disease.
