= Ruth Wilson Epstein =

American nurse (1906–1996)

Ruth Beverly Wilson (1906–1996) was an American nurse married to alleged spy Jacob Epstein. Epstein had been wounded in the Spanish Civil War after he volunteered for the International Brigades. Ruth, who was a nurse, met him while he was recuperating from his injuries. They were allegedly Soviet intelligence agents, who were stationed in Mexico City during World War II. They were allegedly involved in the efforts to break Leon Trotsky's killer, Ramón Mercader, out of a Mexican prison. Wilson's code name in Soviet intelligence and deciphered in the Venona transcripts is "Nona".
