= Claire Epstein =

Israeli archaeologist

- קלייר אפשטיין
- Born: 18 September 1911; London
- Died: 18 August 2000 (aged 88); Kibbutz Ginosar
- Education: University College, London
- Known for: discovery of the Chalcolithic period in the Golan
- Awards: Israel Prize, Percy Schimmel Award
- Scientific career
- Fields: Archaeology
- Workplaces: Israel Antiquities Authority
- Thesis: Palestinian Bichrome Ware
- Doctoral advisor: Kathleen Kenyon

Claire Epstein (Hebrew: קלייר אפשטיין; 18 September 1911 – 18 August 2000) was an Israeli archaeologist. She is noted for her discovery and work on the Chalcolithic culture in the Golan and was a noted member of the Israel Antiquities Authority.

== Biography ==
Epstein was born in London into an upper-class family. Her mother was active in saving Jews from the Nazis. Epstein was involved with Zionist circles at a young age and learned Hebrew early on. Epstein attended King Alfred School and then studied Italian at the University College, London. In 1932, she received her bachelor's degree. Epstein immigrated to British Mandate Palestine in 1937, living in Tel-Aviv. She translated Hebrew for the 1937 Peel Commission. In 1942, she joined the British Army Women's Unit and later became the first woman Sergeant Major from the yishuv.

After two years in the army, she joined the new Kibbutz En Gev, near the Sea of Galilee. Epstein first began to work in archaeology when she helped a team of archaeologists excavating Tel Hazor in 1952. Also in 1952, she adopted a boy whose parents had been killed in a pogrom in Iraq. In 1955, she moved to another kibbutz, Ginossar, on the other side of the Sea of Galilee. Epstein later went back to University College, London to work on her PhD in archaeology, focusing on bichrome pottery from Palestine and working with Kathleen Kenyon. She received her PhD in 1962.

After the Six Day War, in 1967, Epstein, working with Shemaryahu Gutman, was the leader of the archaeological emergency survey in the Golan area. During her survey, she discovered large dolmen fields and also a late prehistoric Chalcolithic Culture in Golan. Epstein became a full-time archaeologist, working for the Department of Antiquities, which later became the Israel Antiquities Authority. To get to her archaeological sites, she often hitchhiked, because she did not have a driver's license and many of her assistants were local Druze villagers.

In 1985, Epstein received the Percy Schimmel Award from the Israel Museum for her work in archaeology. In 1995, she received the Israel Prize for her work. Epstein continued to work on the Chalcolithic sites in the Golan region, which she "almost single-handedly discovered, excavated, and reported" on. In 1998, published her monograph, The Chalcolithic Culture of the Golan in the Israel Antiquities Authority Report. Her monograph describes the unique features of the Golan site which include "house-chains" which are broad-houses linked together in long lines. She was awarded the Irene Levy-Sala award for her monograph. Her attention to the Golan area helped preserve many of the area's archaeological sites. Epstein's analysis of the stratigraphy of Megiddo's sacred areas was also an important part of her body of work. She also helped identify the remains of a 2,000-year-old boat found at the bottom of the Sea of Galilee.

In 2000, she was in Hadassah Hospital in Jerusalem from complications which developed after a fall. She died not long after in her home in Kibbutz Ginosar.

== Publications ==
- Epstein, Claire (1997). Palestinian Bichrome Ware (Ancient Near East). Brill Academic Pub. ISBN 9789004004719.
- Epstein, Claire (1998). The Chalcolithic Culture of the Golan. Israel Antiquities Authority. ISBN 9789654060325.
