= Yishaq Epstein =

Hebrew linguist and educator (1862–1943)

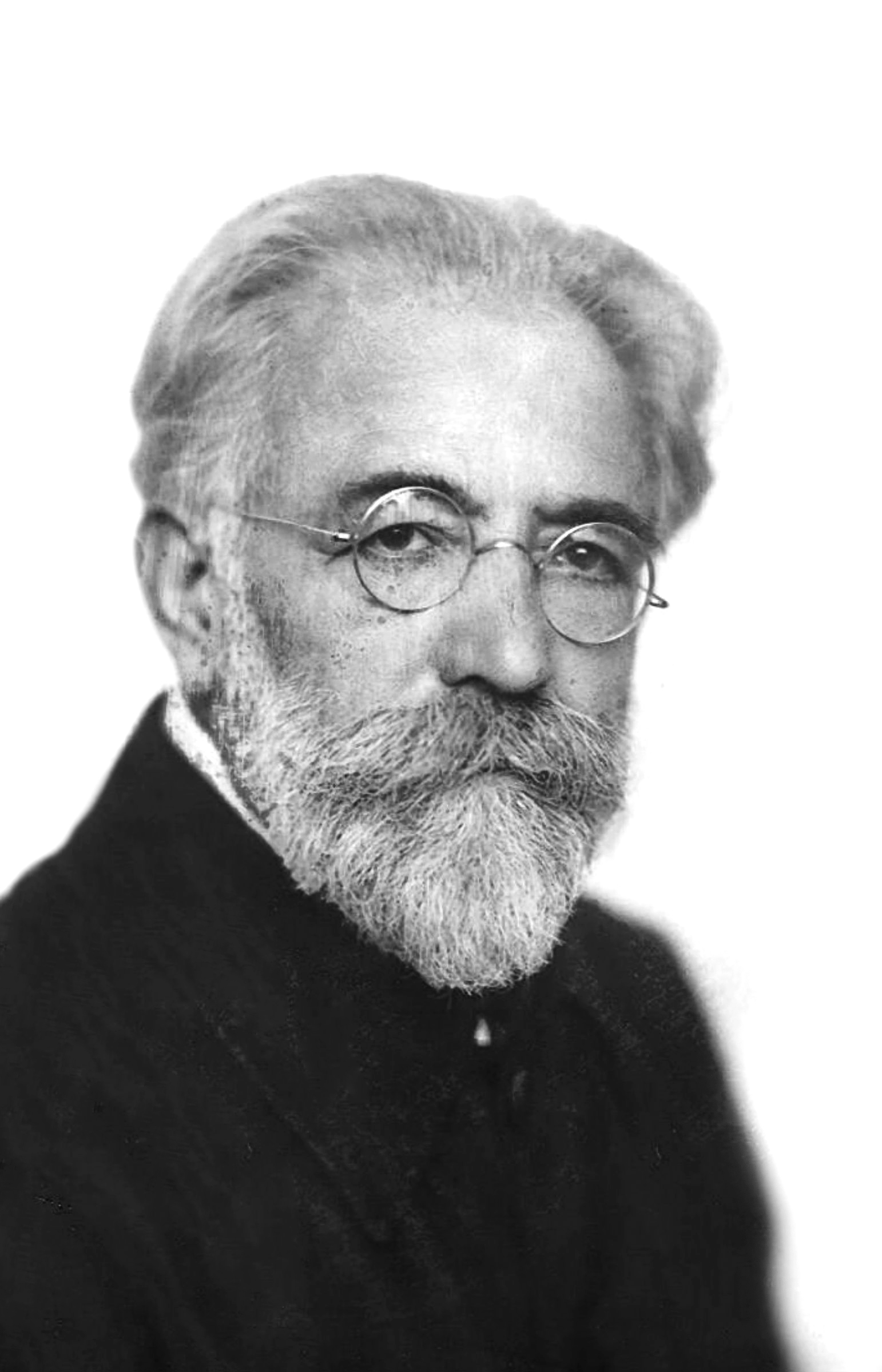

Yitzhak Epstein (יצחק אפשטיין), also known as Yitzhak and Isaac Epstein (Lyuban, Belarus 7 December 1862 – Jerusalem 26 February 1943) was a Russian-born Jewish linguist and educator in Palestine. He is most remembered for his text “The Hidden Question,” which focused on relations between Zionists and Arab Palestinians. He pioneered the “natural method” of teaching Hebrew, in which the teacher makes explanations only in Hebrew.

== Biography ==
Yishaq Epstein moved to Rosh Pina in Palestine in 1886. He participated in the acquisition of Palestinian land by an organization headed by the German Zionist Arthur Ruppin. He witnessed the expulsion of 600 Druze inhabitants from the Palestinian village of Metula in 1908.

He was among the founders of the group "Brit Shalom" in 1925. He was brother of the writer Zalman Epstein.

== Writings ==
=== "The Hidden Question" ===
Epstein presented his essay "The Hidden Question" as a speech at the Seventh Zionist Congress in Basel, Switzerland in 1905. He focused on “one trivial thing [that] we have overlooked so long in our lovely country: there exists an entire people who have held it for centuries, and to whom it would never occur to leave.”

“For a number of years,” Epstein continued, “we have been hearing that the population of [Palestine] exceeds 600,000. Assuming that this number is correct, even if we deduct from it 80,000 Jews, there are still over half a million Arabs,…80 percent of whom support themselves exclusively by farming, and own all the arable land. The time has come to dispel the misconceptions among the Zionists that land in Palestine lies uncultivated for lack of working hands, or laziness of the local residents. There are no deserted fields. Indeed, every Arab peasant tries to add to his plot from the adjoining land…

“Therefore,” Epstein concluded, “when we come to take over the land, the question immediately arises: what will the Arab peasant do when we buy their lands from them?” Epstein’s foreboding was ignored by most of his Zionist contemporaries, and his suggestions were also directly attacked in the press by other Zionists such as Moshe Smilansky.

=== "A Question that Outweighs All Others" ===
Epstein again urged Zionist leaders towards reconciliation with Palestinian Arabs in his article "A Question that Outweighs All Others," published in 1921 in the Hebrew publication Doar Ha-Yom. In the piece, he "focused on the advantages of Zionist settlements for the Arabs, and emphasised that these advantages should be institutionalised, rather than remain a by-product of Zionist activity."

In response, Hayyim Ben Kiki, a Sephardic rabbi from Tiberias, published "Al She’elat ha-She’elot be-Yishuv ha-Aretz" (על שאלת השאלות בישוב הארץ 'The Question of All Questions: Concerning the Settling of the Land') in Do'ar HaYom in 30 August 1921, in which he expanded on Epstein's criticisms of Zionist leaders' policies toward Arabs and ignorance of their language and culture, noting that Epstein's warning was not original, as local Jewry in Palestine had been making the same warning from the late 19th century but had been regularly ignored, and that the oblivious Zionist attitude toward Arabs was similar to the dismissive attitude of Ashkenazi Zionists toward Arabized Jews, presenting both attitudes as consequences of European yehirut (יהירות 'arrogance').

== Hebrew schools in Palestine ==
As principal of the Hebrew school in Rosh Pinna, Epstein encouraged Arab children from neighbouring Al-Ja'una to enroll; four did so.

He was also a major proponent in the revival of the Hebrew language, teaching in and directing public schools in Palestine.

== Legacy ==
The historian Hillel Cohen characterizes Epstein as having "a more nuanced approach" than many of his Zionist contemporaries and, writing with Yuval Evri, describes him as "one of the more sensitive and open leaders of the new Zionist Yishuv toward the Arabs."

== Bibliography ==
- Alan Dowty, “"A Question That Outweighs All Others": Yitzhak Epstein and Zionist Recognition of the Arab Issue”, Israel Studies, volume 6, issue 1, 2001
- Gil Gertel, “The Zionist educator we should have listened to”, +972 Magazine, April 2, 2016, https://972mag.com/the-zionist-educator-we-should-have-listened-to/118345/
- Yuval Evri and Hillel Cohen, “Between Shared Homeland to National Home: The Balfour Declaration from a Native Sephardic Perspective," in The Arab and Jewish Questions, edited by Bashir Bashir and Leila Farsakh (Columbia University Press, 2020), pp. 148–172 (see especially pp 158–159).
- Yosef Gorni, Zionism and the Arabs, 1882 –1948: A Study of Ideology (Oxford: Clarendon Press, 1987), pp. 42 –51
- Adam Shatz (ed.), Prophets Outcast: A Century of Dissident Jewish Writing about Zionism and Israel (New York: Nation Books, 2004), pp. 35–52
- Nathan Weinstock, 1891-1907 : le mouvement sioniste découvre l’existence des Arabes de Palestine. Paris, Honoré Champion, 2016; propose une traduction, accompagnée d’une introduction et d’un commentaire du texte « Une question occultée » d’Yitzhaq Epstein (1907), review by Alina Schlaepfer
- Aline Schlaepfer, « Nathan Weinstock, 1891-1907 : le mouvement sioniste découvre l’existence des Arabes de Palestine », Archives de sciences sociales des religions [En ligne], 184 | octobre-décembre 2018, mis en ligne le 01 décembre 2018, consulté le 10 décembre 2023. URL : http://journals.openedition.org/assr/45272
