= Geoff Epstein =

American politician (born 1947)

Newton School Committee
- In office 2008–2013

Framingham School Committee
- In office 2018–2021

Personal details
- Born: September 11, 1947 (age 79) Punchbowl, New South Wales, Australia
- Party: Democratic
- Spouse: Kathryn Weldon
- Children: 3
- Education: University of Sydney (BS, PhD)
- Occupation: Politician; professor

Geoffrey N. Epstein (/ˈɛpstaɪn/ EP-styne; born September 11, 1947) is an Australian and American former theoretical physics professor and politician. Epstein was a candidate in the 2025 Framingham, Massachusetts, mayoral election, losing to incumbent Charlie Sisitsky. Before that, he was a member of the Newton, Massachusetts, School Committee from 2008 to 2013 and the Framingham School Committee from 2018 to 2021.

== Biography ==
Geoffrey Epstein was born on September 11, 1947, in Punchbowl, New South Wales, Australia. Epstein received both his Bachelors of Science and Doctor of Philosophy from Sydney University in physics. He moved to the United States in 1975 and was an assistant professor of physics at Boston University from 1980 to 1983.

In 2007, Epstein successfully ran for the Ward 1 seat on the Newton School Committee, beating incumbent candidate Gail E. Glick. In the next election cycle, Epstein sponsored a political action committee (PAC) shortly before election day in an attempt to unseat the other members of the Newton School Committee. The attempt largely failed as most incumbent candidates were reelected, with only one candidate solely sponsored by Epstein and the PAC being elected. Epstein adhered to an independent leaning while on the Newton School Committee, often voting against all other members on issues. In 2012, Epstein announced he would not run for reelection the following year, attributing a larger number of independent members being on the committee and his youngest son's graduation from Newton North High School as to why.

Epstein moved to Framingham, Massachusetts in 2014. In 2017, Epstein successfully ran for the District 6 seat on the Framingham School Committee, beating his opponent, Michelle Brosnahan. He ran unopposed for the same seat in 2019. While in office, Epstein was the chair of the committee's finance subcommittee. Epstein's priorities while on the Committee included expanding efforts towards student health and wellness, fixing school bus problems in Framingham, and embracing climate change actions in schools. Epstein opted not to run for a third term in 2021.

In 2025, Epstein announced he would challenge incumbent Charlie Sisitsky for the position of Mayor of Framingham. Epstein outlined the key priorities of his campaign being improved funding for the school system, repairs to the roof, road, water, and sewerage infrastructure, and an increased amount of solar panels placed around the city. In a debate with Sisitsky before the election, Epstein challenged him on the necessity of development in the neighborhood of Nobscot. Epstein also vowed that if elected, he would work with Boston mayor Michelle Wu to bring a uniform resistance to raids by ICE, along with encouraging the Framingham City Council to pass an ordinance banning law enforcement from wearing masks. Additionally, Epstein reaffirmed his belief in the need for increased funding for Framingham schools, solutions to poor water infrastructure, and increased solar panels across the city. On election day, Epstein lost to Sisitsky by a margin of 55.3% to 42.8%. Voting data revealed that while Epstein fared well in the Nobscot neighborhood, where many were wary of the development in the area pushed by the Sisitsky administration, he performed underwhelmingly in Southern Framingham.

== Name ==
While running for mayor of Framingham in 2025, many media outlets reported on the similarity of Epstein's name with American financier and child sex offender Jeffrey Epstein (1953–2019). While having the same spelling, the former pronounces his last name EP-styne (/ˈɛpstaɪn/) as opposed to EP-steen (/ˈɛpstiːn/). Epstein has said that no one in Framingham cares about the similar name, and that among the many differences between the two is "He's a dead American, and I'm an alive Australian." Epstein was supported by New York politician Harvey Epstein, who won a race despite his name's similarly negative associations; Harvey Epstein advised Epstein to lead with his values and his identity as a candidate.
