= Gene Epstein =

American economist (born 1944)

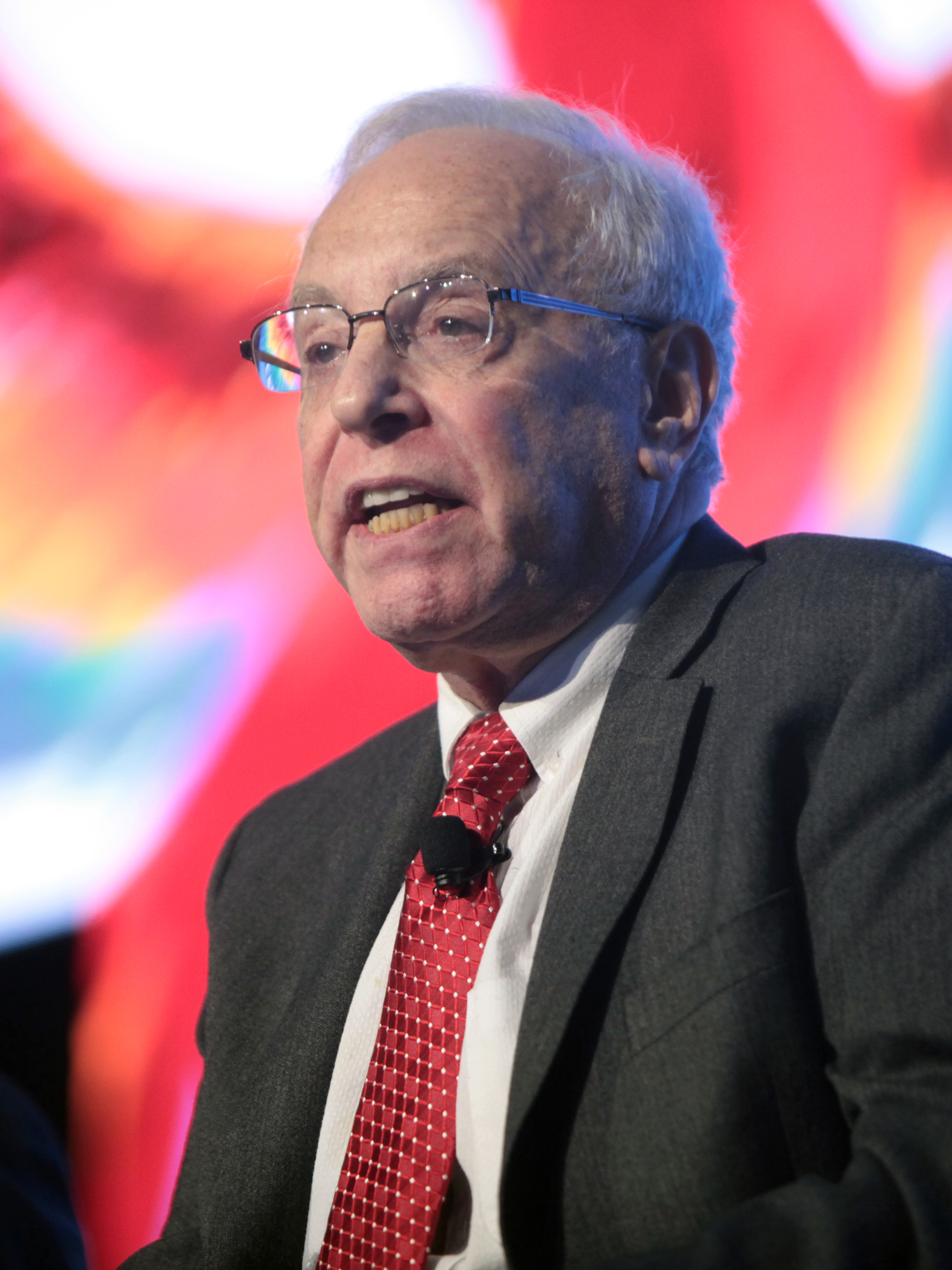
Epstein in 2016

Gene Epstein (born 1944) is an American economist. He is best known for his work advancing libertarian principles and promoting free-market policies. He worked as the economics editor of Barron's Magazine from 1993 to 2018 where he wrote the influential "Economic Beat" column, focusing on macroeconomic trends and critiques of government intervention in markets. He calls himself a follower of the Austrian school of economics and is an associated scholar at the Ludwig von Mises Institute in Auburn, Alabama. Epstein is the co-founder and director of The Soho Forum, a monthly debate series affiliated with the Reason Foundation that features topics of interest to libertarians. He frequently lectures on topics such as monetary policy, the role of government, and the ethics of capitalism. In addition to his journalism and speaking engagements, Epstein has authored books on economic policy and has contributed to a variety of academic and popular publications.

== Career ==
Epstein earned a BA from Brandeis University and an MA in economics from the New School. He taught economics at St. John's University and the City University of New York. He wrote a book called Making Money in Commodities in 1976 and later worked as a senior economist for the New York Stock Exchange.

In 1993 he became economics editor and columnist of "Economic Beat" for Barron's Magazine. His book, Econospinning, was published in 2006. The book was met with some controversy in the blogosphere after Tyler Cowen mentioned it in his blog Marginal Revolution.

He now runs a monthly debate series called The Soho Forum, which "features topics of special interest to libertarians and aims to enhance social and professional ties within the NYC libertarian community." In its most widely viewed debate, Gene himself debated Richard D. Wolff on the issues of socialism and capitalism. As of October 2026, the recording of the debate has been viewed over 9 million times.

== Personal life ==
Gene Epstein currently resides in downtown Manhattan with his wife, the artist Hisako Kobayashi.
