= Wood Library-Museum of Anesthesiology =

Museum in Illinois

The seal of the Wood Library-Museum of Anesthesiology

The Wood Library-Museum of Anesthesiology is a museum and reference collection in Schaumburg, Illinois, dedicated to the history of anesthesiology. It was founded in 1933 by Dr Paul Meyer Wood, who was then Secretary-Treasurer of the American Society of Anesthesiologists (ASA). Initially based at a series of temporary locations, it moved to its permanent home in Schaumburg in 2014. Since 1971 it has been a nonprofit educational organization operating as part of the ASA.

== History ==
=== Founding ===
Paul M. Wood M.D. joined the American Society of Anesthesiologists in 1925 and was made its Secretary-Treasurer in 1929. However, in 1932 he became seriously ill and was unable to work, either as a practicing doctor or for the ASA. While convalescing Wood began to catalogue his personal library, which he had been building since he was a medical student, and told ASA founder Dr. Adolph Frederick Erdmann that he wanted to create a museum dedicated to the history of anesthesiology. Erdmann gave him a collection of books and anesthesiology apparatus to add to his own library as the nucleus of the project. In 1933 Wood donated the entire collection to the ASA. The Society asked him to keep it at his home and appointed him librarian and curator for life. They also named the new collection the Wood Library-Museum of Anesthesiology. By 1934 Wood was well enough to return to work. One of the first things he did was to approach Robert H. Ferguson, a retired anesthesiologist whom Erdmann had told him owned the largest collection of specialist books and apparatus in the US. Ferguson was sympathetic but, still being in good health, preferred to keep his collection at home. Wood turned his attention to the minutes of the Society's meetings, which were now being recorded by a stenographer. As well as discussing ASA business these also contained much information about advances in anesthesiology, and Wood thought they would be a useful resource. He began to make copies and distribute them to the members, and began archiving them in the Library-Museum. In 1938 this system was developed into the ASA's official newsletter.

=== Exhibitions ===
In 1936 the ASA was approached by the organizers of the 1939 New York World's Fair and asked if they could present an exhibit on anesthesiology. The ASA agreed. The next year they received another invitation, this time to create an exhibit for the American Medical Association's annual meeting in San Francisco in June 1938. Again the invitation was accepted. The Library-Museum, which by now had expanded from its original 70 books to over 160 thanks to donations from ASA members (and had also greatly enlarged its collection of apparatus), provided the core of both exhibits.

=== Expansion ===
By 1937 the collection was growing too large for Wood to keep at home and he began looking for a permanent location for it. Still trying to obtain Ferguson's collection he approached a New York City company Ferguson had been associated with, E.R. Squibb and Sons, and suggested that the museum could be located in vacant space in their office building. As bait he proposed that it be called the Robert H. Ferguson Memorial Library. Ferguson didn't take the bait but Squibb did, and the Wood Library-Museum was moved to their building. More books were donated, including 30 from Ferguson, and the collection continued to grow. The larger location had space for more apparatus and members soon started making gifts of their old equipment, including some very early anesthetic delivery systems. The ASA was also now funding the collection through voluntary donations from members.

In 1950 the Wood Library-Museum of Anesthesiology was officially incorporated in New York as a nonprofit educational institution. It moved to Park Ridge, Illinois, in 1963, and again to its permanent home at 1061 American Lane, Schaumburg, IL 60173–4973 in 2014. In 1971 the New York incorporation was dissolved, making the Library-Museum officially part of the ASA, and in 1987 it was incorporated in Illinois as a nonprofit under ASA auspices.

== Collection ==
=== Library ===
The historic medical collection has now expanded to over 8,000 books, and the library also contains print historic medical journals, newsletters, biographical material and archives of photos and digital images. A rare book room preserves older titles as well as letters and other material. Many of these are being digitized to allow them to be read without risking the original copies.

The John W. Pender Living History of Anesthesiology is a multimedia collection containing audio recordings of prominent anesthesiologists.

=== Museum ===
The museum houses a large collection of anesthesiology apparatus ranging from 19th century masks and inhalers for administering ether and chloroform to anesthetic machines. and modern electronic monitoring equipment. A small amount are on exhibit and viewable by appointment.

== Online resources ==
The Wood Library-Museum of Anesthesiology provides a number of online resources for anyone interested in the history of anesthesiology. Out of copyright books are being digitized and made available as free E-books. and the museum also has a YouTube channel with a large collection of anesthesiology-related videos, mostly produced by the museum itself, including demonstrations of apparatus from the collection.
