= Temi Epstein =

American former child actress

- Born: Temi LeAnne Epstein; January 6, 1975 (age 51); Marietta, Cobb County, Georgia, U.S.

Temi LeAnne Epstein (born January 6, 1975) is an American former child actress active in the middle 1980s. Her best-known movie is in Friday the 13th Part VI, but her more remarkable role was the one of "Young Ashton Main" in the 1985 miniseries North and South.

Epstein was born Tamar Le Anne Epstein in Marietta, Cobb County, Georgia and is a graduate from Northwestern University. She is currently an SAT instructor of a Jewish community in Atlanta, Fulton County, Georgia.

She married Evan Levy on September 3, 2000.

== Filmography ==
- 1999 - Take It Easy as Fawn
- 1994 - Last Time Out as Julie Davis
- 1991 - In the Heat of the Night as Terri in episode "Child of Promise" (1991)
- 1986 - Friday the 13th Part VI: Jason Lives as Little Girl
- 1985 - North and South as Young Ashton Main
