= Margaret J. Eppstein =

American complex systems scientist

Margaret Jean Eppstein (also published as Margaret J. E. Heinrich) is an American multidisciplinary scholar whose research involves the computational modeling of complex systems in various application domains. She is a professor emerita and research professor of computer science at the University of Vermont.

== Education and career ==
Eppstein grew up in the countryside in Galesburg, Michigan, a small town outside Kalamazoo, Michigan, where her father worked as a research scientist at Upjohn. Her parents built one of the eight Frank Lloyd Wright-designed homes near Kalamazoo. After switching majors every year in the Honor's College at Michigan State University, she graduated in Zoology in 1978. She did graduate study in zoology in the early 1980s at the University of Washington and University of Vermont, before switching to computer science, in which she earned a master's degree at the University of Vermont in 1983. She continued at the University of Vermont as a lecturer in computer science, a position she held from 1983 to 2001.

While working at the University of Vermont, she entered graduate study in civil and environmental engineering there in 1993, and completed her Ph.D. in 1997, under the supervision of David E. Dougherty. On completing her Ph.D., she became a research assistant professor in computer science, a year later adding a secondary appointment as research assistant professor of civil and environmental engineering. She became a regular-rank assistant professor of computer science in 2002, and added a secondary appointment as assistant professor of biology in 2005.

She was founding director of the University of Vermont Complex Systems Center from 2006 until 2010, was tenured as associate professor in 2008, and promoted to full professor in 2014. She chaired the University of Vermont computer science department from 2012 until 2018, when she retired. She has continued to do research as professor emerita and research professor.

== Research ==
Eppstein's research involves the computational modeling of complex systems in various application domains. It has included studies of the foraging strategies of antlions,^{[HH]} the use of ground-penetrating radar to measure soil moisture,^{[ED]} the reconstruction of 3d structure from fluorescence,^{[EHGS][GZES]} the prediction of cascading failures in electric power transmission,^{[EH]} and the popularity of plug-in hybrid vehicles.^{[EGMR]}

Her work on fluorescence tomography^{[GZES]} won the 2004 Sylvia Sorkin Greenfield Award of the American Association of Physicists in Medicine. She has also won several other best paper awards for her publications.

== Selected publications ==
HH.	Heinrich, Bernd; Heinrich, Margaret J. E. (February 1984), "The pit-trapping foraging strategy of the ant lion, Myrmeleon immaculatus DeGeer (Neuroptera: Myrmeleontidae)", Behavioral Ecology and Sociobiology, 14 (2): 151–160, Bibcode:1984BEcoS..14..151H, doi:10.1007/bf00291906, S2CID 31779039

ED.	Eppstein, Margaret J.; Dougherty, David E. (August 1998), "Efficient three-dimensional data inversion: Soil characterization and moisture Monitoring from cross-well ground-penetrating radar at a Vermont test site", Water Resources Research, 34 (8): 1889–1900, Bibcode:1998WRR....34.1889E, doi:10.1029/98wr00776, S2CID 447374

EHGS.	Eppstein, Margaret J.; Hawrysz, Daniel J.; Godavarty, Anuradha; Sevick-Muraca, Eva M. (July 2002), "Three-dimensional, Bayesian image reconstruction from sparse and noisy data sets: Near-infrared fluorescence tomography", Proceedings of the National Academy of Sciences, 99 (15): 9619–9624, Bibcode:2002PNAS...99.9619E, doi:10.1073/pnas.112217899, PMC 124950, PMID 12105269

GZES.	Godavarty, A.; Zhang, C.; Eppstein, M. J.; Sevick-Muraca, E. M. (January 2004), "Fluorescence-enhanced optical imaging of large phantoms using single and simultaneous dual point illumination geometries", Medical Physics, 31 (2): 183–190, Bibcode:2004MedPh..31..183G, doi:10.1118/1.1639321, PMID 15000603

EH.	Eppstein, Margaret J.; Hines, Paul D. H. (August 2012), "A 'random chemistry' algorithm for identifying collections of multiple contingencies that initiate cascading failure", IEEE Transactions on Power Systems, 27 (3): 1698–1705, doi:10.1109/tpwrs.2012.2183624

EGMR.	Eppstein, Margaret J.; Grover, David K.; Marshall, Jeffrey S.; Rizzo, Donna M. (June 2011), "An agent-based model to study market penetration of plug-in hybrid electric vehicles", Energy Policy, 39 (6): 3789–3802, Bibcode:2011EnPol..39.3789E, doi:10.1016/j.enpol.2011.04.007
