= Isadore Epstein =

Estonian astronomer

- Born: 23 October 1919; Tallinn, Estonia
- Died: 17 September 1995 (aged 75); New York, New York
- Education: Princeton University
- Scientific career
- Fields: Astronomy
- Workplaces: Columbia University

Isadore Epstein (October 23, 1919 in Tallinn, Estonia – September 17, 1995 in New York City) was an astronomer. Epstein taught astronomy at Columbia University for 37 years. He completed his Ph.D. at Princeton University, following which he was appointed as an instructor at Columbia in 1950, assistant professor in 1953, associate professor in 1957, and professor in 1971. He was named professor emeritus in 1987. He served as acting departmental chairman in 1959.

His early work at Columbia included development of theoretical models of the Sun (following on work he did with Martin Schwarzschild at Princeton). He was the first, in this connection, to recognize the importance of the opacity of matter in terms of its resistance to the flow of solar radiation, leading to the first models of the Sun to give sensible values for its energy output.

Epstein was a leader in the first modern surveys to find sites for observatories in the Southern Hemisphere. He studied the clarity and stability of the atmosphere and accessibility of sites in Australia, South Africa, Chile, and Argentina during the 1960s. Major observatories were constructed at all the sites he recommended, and he was particularly involved with the establishment of the Leoncito observatory in Argentina. A long term study of stellar motions was instituted there, and Argentina's national observatory was moved to the site.

La Silla and Cerro Tololo observatories in Chile were sited based on Epstein's work, and Mauna Kea in Hawaii was sited using his methods of site selection.

== Honor ==
An asteroid discovered at one of the observatories mentioned above, La Silla, named asteroid 2928 Epstein in his honor.
