= Randi Hutter Epstein =

American medical journalist and writer

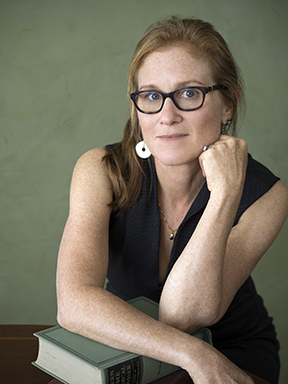
- Born: December 10, 1962 (age 63)
- Occupations: Author, medical writer/adjunct professor
- Known for: Get Me Out: A History of Childbirth from the Garden of Eden to the Sperm Bank Aroused: The History of Hormones and How They Control Just About Everything
- Spouse: Stuart Epstein
- Children: 4
- Website: randihutterepstein.com

Randi Hutter Epstein is an American medical writer, author and journalist, has written for publications such as New York Times, and The Washington Post. She is also a lecturer at Yale University, a writer-in-residence at the Yale School of Medicine and an adjunct professor at Columbia University Graduate School of Journalism.

Epstein has worked as a medical writer for the London bureau of The Associated Press and was the London bureau chief of Physicians' Weekly. Her articles have also appeared in The Daily Telegraph, The Guardian, Parents, More, among other newspapers and magazines.

== Education ==
Epstein earned a B.S. from the University of Pennsylvania where she studied the history and sociology of science. She earned an M.S. from the Columbia University School of Journalism, an M.D. from Yale University School of Medicine, and an M.P.H. from the Columbia University Mailman School of Public Health.

== Books ==
Epstein is the author of Aroused: The History of Hormones and How They Control Just About Everything (released by W. W. Norton, June 2018) and Get Me Out: A History of Childbirth from the Garden of Eden to the Sperm Bank (released by W. W. Norton, Jan 2010).

== Articles ==
- Cases: So Lucky to Have Given Birth in England, New York Times — Dec. 4, 2001
- ESSAY; Questioning the 'Deadline' for Weaning, New York Times — Sept. 21, 1999
- The Novice: Hardly out of Diapers and Now Into Yoga, New York Times — June 15, 1999
- Richard Selzer, Who Fictionalized Medicine's Absurdity and Gore, Dies at 87, New York Times — June 15, 2016
- Howard W. Jones Jr., a Pioneer of Reproductive Medicine, Dies at 104, New York Times — July 31, 2015, Page A1
- You Don't Actually Have Cancer, Daily Beast, July 13, 2013
