= Robert M. Epstein =

American anesthesiologist (1928–2024)

Robert M. Epstein MD
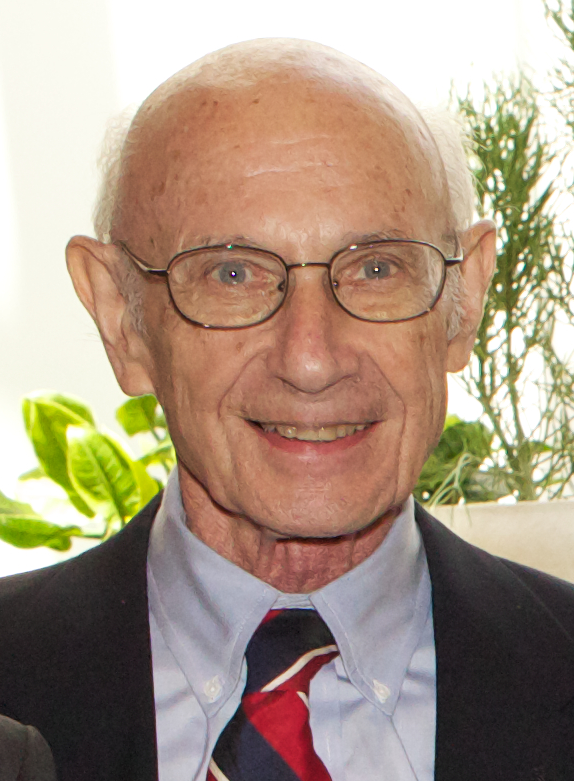
- Epstein in 2012
- Born: March 10, 1928; Bronx, New York, U.S.
- Died: July 23, 2024 (aged 96); Boston, Massachusetts, U.S.
- Education: B.S. Chemistry, University of Michigan (1947); M.D., University of Michigan (1951)
- Occupation: Harold Carron Professor of Anesthesiology (emeritus)
- Employer: The University of Virginia
- Spouse: Lillian C. Epstein (m. 1950)

Robert Marvin Epstein (March 10, 1928 – July 23, 2024) was an American anesthesiologist, a member of the National Academy of Medicine, and the Harold Carron Professor of Anesthesiology (emeritus) at the University of Virginia.

== Early life and education ==
Epstein was born in the Bronx, New York on March 10, 1928, the son of immigrants from Slonim, in present-day Belarus. He attended primary school in the Bronx, and completed his secondary education in Miami Beach, Florida where the family moved in 1940. From there he attended the University of Michigan from 1944 to 1951, where he obtained both his bachelor's and MD degrees. Epstein served as an attending anesthesiologist with a rank of 1st Lieutenant in the US Army Medical Corps, and was stationed first in Korea and later in Japan.

== Columbia University ==
Epstein underwent residency training at Columbia University in the department chaired by Emanuel Papper, and subsequently joined the Columbia faculty.

He developed an early interest in the causes and prevention of avoidable death due to anesthesia, and was an advocate for the mandatory implementation of specific improvements in anesthesia machines and for the analysis of adverse critical incidents. The technical improvements were designed to prevent the inadvertent administration of oxygen-deficient mixtures of anesthetic gases. Although the hazards of such mixtures had been appreciated since the 1940s, the work published by Epstein and coauthors in 1962 represents the first oxygen "fail safe" apparatus proposed for inhalation anesthesia. The first oxygen "fail safe" device to be custom built and employed in clinical practice following these principles is on display at the Wood Library-Museum. Such oxygen safety functions have been a required component of continuous-flow anesthesia machines since 1979.

In addition to his commitment to improvements in the safety of anesthesia equipment and practices, Epstein had a sustained research interest in mechanisms of the pulmonary uptake and circulatory distribution of anesthetic gases. With colleagues, Epstein was the first to establish the mutual effects of multiple gas interactions on rates of anesthetic uptake, known as the "second gas effect." This refers to the phenomenon that when high potency anesthetics (e.g. halothane and chloroform) are administered at low concentrations, in mixtures with anesthetic agents administered at high concentrations (e.g. nitrous oxide), the high concentration component promotes the uptake of the low concentration component; in this setting, the low concentration component is known as the "second gas" and the acceleration of its uptake by nitrous oxide was called the "second gas effect".

== University of Virginia ==
Epstein became the chairman of the Department of Anesthesiology at the University of Virginia in 1972, and led the department for 24 years. In honor of his service to the department, an endowed chair was created, the Robert M. Epstein Professorship in Anesthesiology. During his tenure as chairman at UVa, he was instrumental to the establishment (and served as president) of the University of Virginia Health Services Foundation, an organization devoted to strengthening the medical faculty

== Honors, awards, and service to the profession ==
Member, IOM / National Academy of Medicine, elected 1989

Fellow of the Royal College of Anaesthetists (England), elected 1981

Director, American Board of Anesthesiology (1972 - 1984)

President, American Board of Anesthesiology (1982 - 1983)

Board Member, Educational Commission for Foreign Medical Graduates (1991 - 1996)

Member, Editorial Board, Anesthesiology (5 year term)

Past President, Association of University Anesthesiologists

== Selected publications ==
- Frumin, MJ; Epstein, RM; Cohen, G (1959). "Apneic oxygenation in man". Anesthesiology. 20 (6): 789–98. doi:10.1097/00000542-195911000-00007. PMID 13825447. S2CID 33528267.
- Epstein, RM; Wheeler, HO; Frumin, MJ; Habif, DV; Papper, EM; Bradley, SE (1961). "The effect of hypercapnia on estimated hepatic blood flow, circulating splanchnic blood volume, and hepatic sulfobromophthalein clearance during general anesthesia in man". J Clin Invest. 40 (3). J Clin Invest.: 592–8. doi:10.1172/JCI104288. PMC 290757. PMID 13697023.
- Epstein, RM; Rackow, H; Lee, AS; Papper, EM (1962). "Prevention of accidental breathing of anoxic gas mixtures during anesthesia". Anesthesiology. 23: 1–4. doi:10.1097/00000542-196201000-00001. PMID 13890440. S2CID 30894367.
- Epstein, RM; Rackow, H; Salanitre, E; Wolf, GL (1964). "Influence of the Concentration Effect on the Uptake of Anesthetic Mixtures: The Second Gas Effect". Anesthesiology. 25: 364–71. doi:10.1097/00000542-196405000-00015. PMID 14156577. S2CID 28601955.
- Eger, EI; Epstein, RM (1964). "Hazards of Anesthetic Equipment". Anesthesiology. 25 (4): 490–504. doi:10.1097/00000542-196407000-00012. PMID 14192796.
