= Palais Epstein =

Building in Vienna, Austria

Coordinates: 48°12′23″N 16°21′33″E

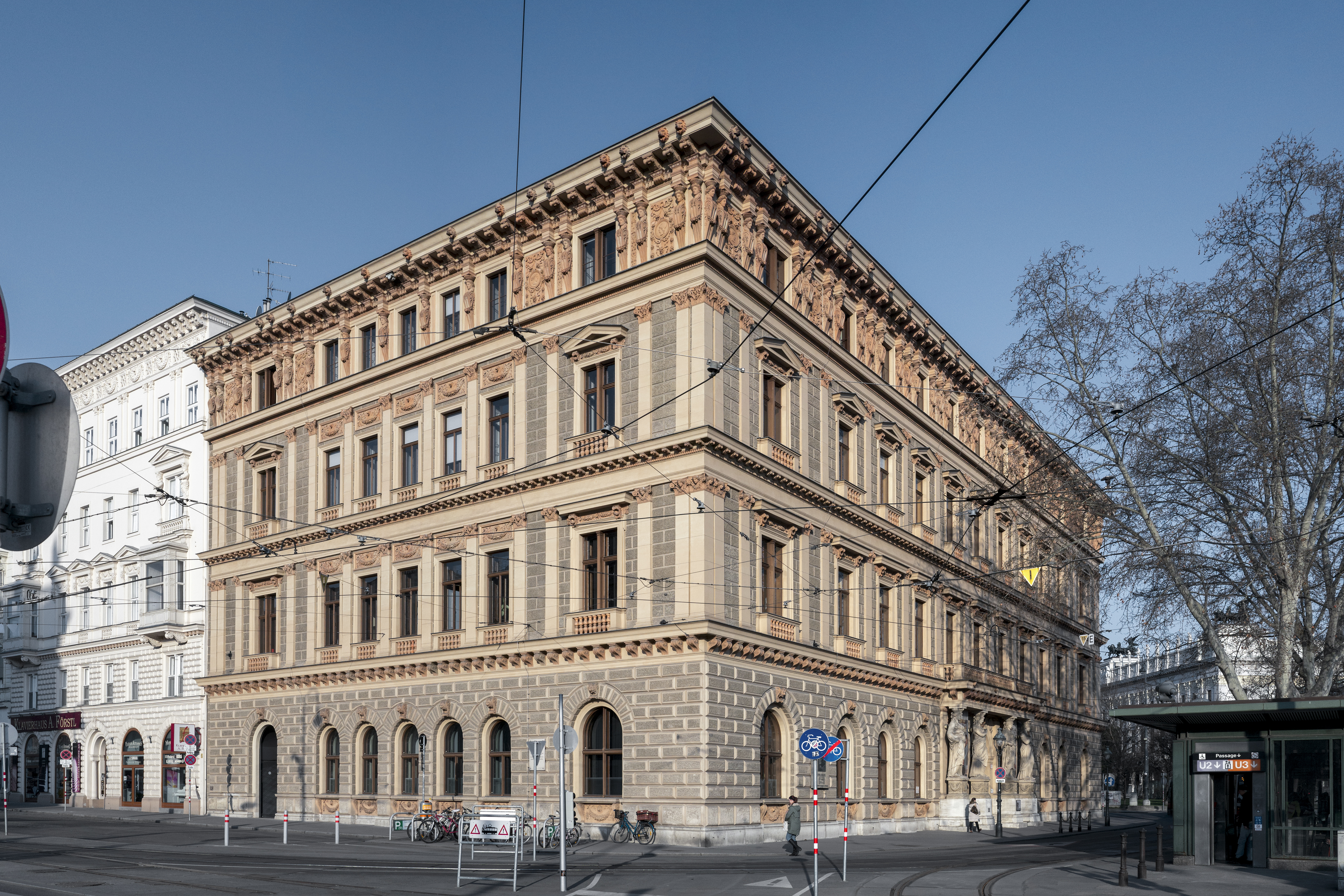
Palais Epstein, Vienna, Austria

Palais Epstein is a Ringstraßenpalais in Vienna, Austria. It was built for the industrialist and banker Gustav Ritter von Epstein. The architect was Theophil Freiherr von Hansen, who also designed the adjacent Austrian Parliament Building. Unlike traditional Baroque noble palaces in Vienna, Palais Epstein was built in the late 19th century and is therefore considered a Ringstraßenpalais. It is up to five storeys high and built in the neo-Renaissance style typical of its time.

Following the Gründerkrach ("Founders' Crash", the 9 May 1873 crash of the Vienna Stock Exchange), Epstein had to sell the palais to the Imperial Continental Gas Association, an English gas company, to avoid bankruptcy. In 1902 it was acquired by the State and used as domicile of the Administrative Court. After conversions, it became home to the Vienna School Authority in 1922. Following the Anschluss, it housed offices of the Reichsstatthalter's building authorities.

From 1945 to 1955 (the Allied occupation of Austria), the palais was domicile of the Soviet headquarters. After that, it briefly served as a branch of the Academy of Music and Performing Arts and then again for the School Authority until 2002. After a thorough refurbishment, it has been a branch of nearby parliament ever since. A permanent exhibition about the history of the palais and its owners has been set up in the basement, and there are guided tours of the bel étage (first floor), which has been restored to its original state.
