= Gustav von Epstein =

Austrian banker (1828–1879)

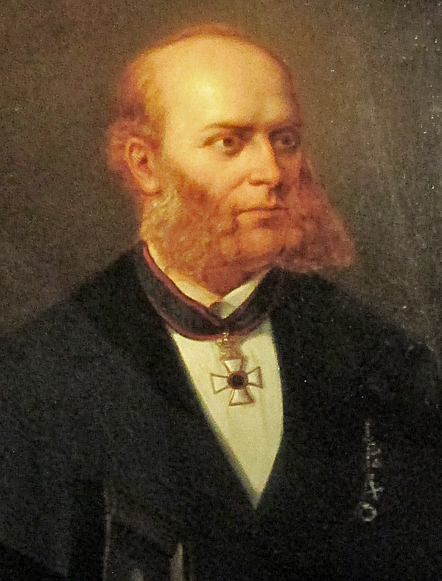
- Born: 10 April 1828; Prague, Bohemia, Austrian Empire
- Died: 23 September 1879; Vienna, Austria
- Occupations: Industrialist, banker
- Notable work: Palais Epstein

Gustav Ritter von Epstein (10 April 1828 – 23 September 1879) was an Austrian industrialist and banker who commissioned the Palais Epstein.

== Biography ==
Epstein was born on 10 April 1828 in Prague. He was the fourth child of Leopold Epstein, who was the director of the National Bank at the time, and his wife Caroline, who was from a prestigious textile industry family. After Gustav's father died in 1864, he took over his father's banking business. Due to his philanthropy, in 1866, Emperor Franz Joseph bestowed Epstein with the Iron Crown 3rd Class. The next year, Epstein commissioned the architect Otto Wagner to build him a villa in Baden. Most of Gustav's fortune was destroyed in the Panic of 1873, partially due to Adolf Taussig, who had speculated with Epstein's money before committing suicide later that year. In response, Epstein sold his villa to Archduke Rainer Ferdinand a few months later. Epstein died in 1879 in Vienna.

According to contemporary sources, Brigitte Haentjens described him as following:

Tall and slim, with a beard trimmed in the English fashion. He is serious and sensitive, of weak health and always has a very pale complexion. A well-travelled, multilingual man of education and great interest in art, but a man committed to the public. He does not derive his self-confidence from his money, but from the public respect that accrues to him from his offices and numerous honorary functions.
