= Stephen Epstein (cardiologist) =

American physician

Stephen E. Epstein is the Head of Translational and Vascular Biology Research at the MedStar Heart and Vascular Institute, MedStar Washington Hospital Center and Clinical Professor of Medicine at the Georgetown University School of Medicine.

== Early Education ==
After graduating summa cum laude from Columbia College and elected to Phi Beta Kappa, Epstein took his medical training at Cornell University Medical College. He was elected to AOA, the medical honor society. Epstein interned at the New York Hospital, New York, NY.

== Career ==
Epstein served for over 30 years as Chief of the Cardiology Branch of the NHLBI at the National Institutes of Health in Bethesda, MD. He then served as executive director of the Cardiovascular Research Institute and Director of Vascular Biology Research, at the MedStar Health Research Institute, Washington Hospital Center. He currently serves as Head of Translational Research at the MedStar Heart and Vascular Institute, MedStar Washington Hospital Center.

With more than 500 publications in peer‐reviewed medical journals, Epstein is a recognized international authority on angiogenesis and on the application of stem cell strategies for cardiovascular therapeutics. His recent work on stem cell therapy has demonstrated that mesenchymal stem cells (MSCs) when administered intravenously to mice with acute myocardial infarction and to mice with ischemic cardiomyopathy, markedly attenuate the progressive development of adverse left ventricular remodeling and deterioration in LV function. He and his associates have also demonstrated that one of the mechanisms responsible for these beneficial effects is a modulation of the excessive immune and inflammatory responses that are triggered by the presence of an injured left ventricle. These observations resulted in the initiation of two clinical trials testing the efficacy of the intravenous injection of MSCs in patients with heart failure. The observations are now being used to inform the development of novel monoclonal antibody strategies to modulate inflammation for treating patients with myocardial infarctions, patients with heart failure, and patients with various autoimmune diseases.

Epstein and his colleagues have developed a biomarker strategy that identifies patients with coronary artery disease who are at very high near-term risk of experiencing death or an acute myocardial infarction.

== Associations ==
Epstein served on two National Heart, Lung, and Blood Institute (NHLBI) committees: Vice‐Chairman of the Data Safety Management Board (DSMB) for Programs of Excellence in Gene and Cell Therapy for the Heart, Lung, and Blood Institute, and Chairman of the DSMB for Specialized Centers for Clinically Oriented Research in Cardiac Dysfunction and Disease.

Epstein is also a Fellow of the American Heart Association, a member of the Association of American Physicians, and an Honorary Fellow of the American College of Chest Physicians. He is the recipient of the Distinguished WELCOME Lecturer award, was selected for the Pfizer Visiting Professor Program.
