= Nikolay Epshtein =

Soviet ice hockey coach

- Николай Эпштейн
- Born: 17 December 1919; Kolomna, Soviet Union
- Died: 27 August 2005 (aged 85); Selyatino, Russia
- Resting place: Vostryakovsky Cemetery, Moscow
- Citizenship: Russian
- Occupation: Ice hockey coach

Nikolay Semyonovich Epshtein (Russian: Николай Семёнович Эпштейн; 27 December 1919 – 27 August 2005) was a Soviet ice hockey coach.

== Biography ==
Epshtein, who was Jewish, was born in Kolomna, Russian FSFR, Soviet Union. He coached from 1953 to 1975 in the Soviet National League as head coach of Khimik in Voskresensk. He was also head coach of the Soviet junior national team that won a European Championship.

He was inducted into the International Jewish Sports Hall of Fame in 2001. He was an inaugural inductee to the Russian Ice Hockey Hall of Fame in 2005. He died from Alzheimers in 2005.

== See also ==
- List of select Jewish coaches
