= Russell Epstein =

American psychologist

Russell Epstein is an American professor of psychology at the University of Pennsylvania, who studies neural mechanisms underlying visual scene perception, event perception, object recognition, and spatial navigation in humans. His lab studies the role of the parahippocampal and retrosplenial cortices in determining how people orient themselves relative to their surroundings.

== Education ==
Epstein received an undergraduate degree in physics at the University of Chicago and a Ph.D. in computer vision with Alan Yuille at Harvard. He also held postdoctoral fellowships with Nancy Kanwisher (1997-1999) at MIT and John Duncan (1999-2001) at the MRC-CBU.
