= Alan H. Epstein =

Alan H. Epstein (born February 9, 1949) is a distinguished aeronautical engineer. He received his S.B., S.M. and Ph.D. degrees from Massachusetts Institute of Technology in 1971, 1972 and 1975 respectively. At M.I.T. he was the R.C. Maclaurin Professor of Aeronautics and Astronautics and the Director of the Gas Turbine Laboratory.

Epstein was elected a member of the National Academy of Engineering in 1999 for time-resolved flow and heat transfer measurements in turbo-mechanics, and for conception and development of smart engines and micro-engines. He is also a Fellow of the American Institute of Aeronautics and Astronautics and the American Society of Mechanical Engineers.

He currently works at Pratt & Whitney where he is responsible for long-term technology and environmental strategy. He is also Professor Emeritus at the Department of Aeronautics and Astronautics at the Massachusetts Institute of Technology.
