= Epstein Hebrew Academy =

H.F. Epstein Hebrew Academy
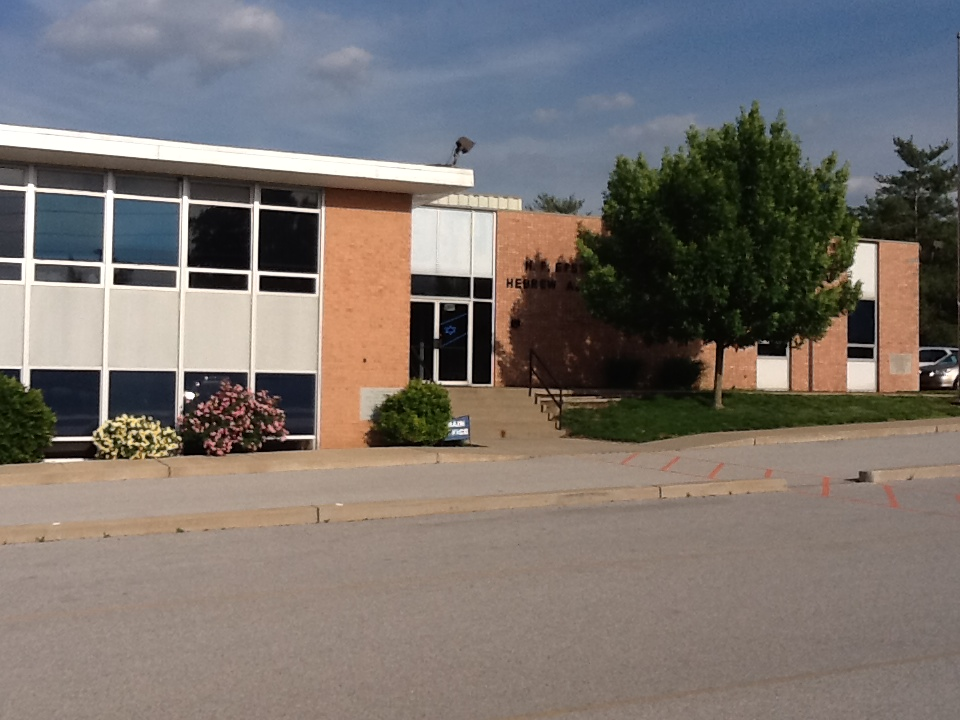

Location
- 8645 Old Bonhomme Rd; University City, Missouri 63132; United States

Information
- Type: Private Jewish day school
- Religious affiliation: Orthodox Judaism
- Established: 1943; 83 years ago
- Head of school: Rabbi Shmuel Miller
- Faculty: 46
- Grades: PK–12
- Enrollment: 155 (2024)
- Average class size: 9
- Accreditation: Cognia
- Yearbook: The Source
- Website: eha.org

H.F. Epstein Hebrew Academy (EHA) is a Jewish day school in University City, Missouri. It was established in 1943 and was the first Jewish day school in St. Louis. The school is named for the first chief rabbi of the Orthodox Jewish community of St. Louis, Rabbi Hayim Fischel Epstein (1874–1942).

From 1960 until the end of 2019, the school was housed on the six-acre Israel and Yetra Goldberg Educational Campus in Olivette, Missouri. In January 2020, it moved to a new location in University City, closer to where many of the students of the school are from. The school also housed Yeshivat Kadimah High School from its founding in 2013, until it merged with EHA in 2019 and moved with it to University City in 2020.

== History ==
The H.F. Epstein Hebrew Academy, established in 1943, was the first Jewish day school in St. Louis. The school is named for the first chief rabbi of the Orthodox Jewish community of St. Louis, Rabbi Haim Fishel Epstein (1874–1942).

Until the establishment of the school, Jewish education in St. Louis had been provided by a system of Talmudei Torah. These schools were administered by the "United Hebrew Schools" organization, later reorganized as the "Associated Hebrew Schools of St. Louis", under the leadership of Harry Yawitz. In 1922, there were four Orthodox Talmudei Torah in St. Louis providing for the Jewish educational needs of the community. By 1939, there were fourteen of these schools, located mostly on the premises of various synagogues. In 1943, Yawitz was one of the founders and supporters of the H.F. Epstein Hebrew Academy, which consolidated the Talmudei Torah into the first Orthodox Jewish day school in St. Louis.

At first, the school did not have a dedicated school building. Classes were held in various locations including homes, synagogue classrooms and other school buildings. In 1960, the construction of a building in Olivette was completed and became the permanent location of the EHA.

In 2019, EHA sold the school building and property in Olivette to the Miriam Academy and purchased a new location in University City. The school moved to the new location in January 2020. The new location was originally a public school building built in 1958.

== Curriculum and activities ==
The school defines itself as a child-centered Orthodox Jewish day school, dedicated to educating Jewish children in Torah and general studies, developing love for Israel and the Jewish people, teaching critical thinking and reasoning, excelling in all the academic disciplines and instilling good character (middot) and values of caring for others (chesed).

The school is accredited by the Independent Schools Association of the Central States (ISACS) and is associated with the Torah U’Mesorah (National Association of Hebrew Day Schools) network of schools and Yeshiva University’s Institute for University School Partnership.

The school is overseen by an elected Board of Directors. The parent organization, Friends of the Hebrew Academy raises funds and holds educational and other events for the school.

The school follows a dual curriculum of Judaic studies, including Hebrew language, and general studies. The general studies curriculum generally complies with the requirements of the Missouri Department of Education.

After-school activities that are offered include art, sports and drama.

== Notable alumni ==
- David Makovsky (1975), Ziegler Distinguished Fellow at The Washington Institute and director of the Koret Project on Arab-Israel Relations.

== Heads of School ==
Rabbi Shmuel Miller is the current Head of the School, since August 2021.

Former heads of school include:

- Rabbi Moshe Shulman (2019–2021)
- Rabbi Yaakov Green (2014–2019)
- Rabbi Avi Greene (2010–2014)
- Rabbi Shmuel Kay (2005–2010)
- Rabbi Joshua Einzig (1998–2005)
- Rabbi David Leibtag (1990–1998)
- Rabbi Dr. Joseph Rischall (1978–1990)
- Rabbi Donald Patchen (1973–1978)
- Rabbi Chaim Tzvi Hollander (1964–1973)
- Rabbi Abraham Kellner (1957–1964)
