= Samuel Epstein (politician) =

American lawyer and physician

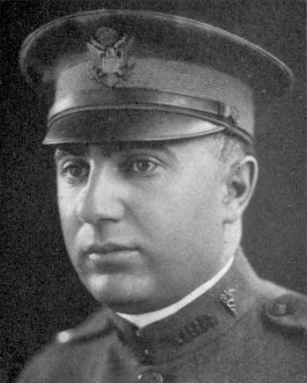

Member of the Illinois House of Representatives
- In office 1951
- Constituency: 19th District

Personal details
- Born: January 1, 1890 Odessa, Russian Empire
- Died: April 21, 1951 (aged 61) Chicago, Illinois, US
- Resting place: Rosehill Cemetery
- Party: Democratic
- Spouse: Florence Siegal (m. 1913)
- Education: Chicago College of Medicine and Surgery; John Marshall Law School
- Occupation: Lawyer, physician, politician

Samuel S. Epstein (January 1, 1890 – April 21, 1951) was a Russian-American lawyer and physician.

== Biography ==
Epstein was born in Odessa on January 1, 1890. He emigrated to the United States when he was fourteen years old and settled in Chicago, Illinois. He married Florence Siegal in 1913, and they had three children.

Epstein was educated in the Chicago public schools. He received his bachelor's and medical degrees from the Chicago College of Medicine and Surgery in 1914. Epstein served in the Medical Corps of the United States Army during World War I and was commissioned a captain. He went to John Marshall Law School and was admitted to the Illinois bar in 1941. He practiced law with his daughter in Chicago.

Epstein was a Democrat and served as the attorney for the Cook County Democratic Central Committee. He served in the Illinois House of Representatives for the 19th District in 1951, when he died while still in office. Epstein died at Mount Sinai Hospital in Chicago on April 21. He was buried at Rosehill Cemetery.
