= Jacob Epstein (spy) =

Soviet spy in World War II

Jacob Epstein (10 November 1903 – 10 February 1998), also known as Jake Bermanen, was an American-born Soviet spy.

Epstein was born in Brooklyn, New York of Russian parents. He graduated from Cornell University in 1924, where he became friends with Anna Colloms, who was also a student. In 1938, Epstein volunteered for the International Brigades during the Spanish Civil War, and was badly wounded. Epstein married Ruth Beverly Wilson, whom he met while convalescing from his injuries, and both allegedly served as Soviet intelligence operatives.

During World War II, Epstein was stationed by Soviet intelligence in Mexico City, where he was a "student" at the National Autonomous University of Mexico. Epstein was put in charge of the Gnome Project, which was the secret plan to free Ramón Mercader, Leon Trotsky's murderer, from jail.

Epstein is referenced in Venona decrypt 800 New York to Moscow 28 May 1943, and another decrypt on 30 May 1943. The material cites Epstein as having placed two agents in the prison where Mercader was held. The plan called for moving Mercader out of Mexico once the jailbreak was made.

Venona decrypt 193–194 Mexico City to Moscow, 14 March 1944 identifies Anna Colloms, while on a courier mission to Mexico, reporting the KGB detected surveillance of Ruth Wilson, Epstein's wife, and Colloms, who went to Mexico for liaison with Jacob Epstein, but achieved nothing.

== Venona ==
Jacob Epstein's code names in Soviet intelligence are "Harry" and "Garri". Epstein is referenced in the following Venona decryptions:

- 800 KGB New York to Moscow, 28 May 1943;
- 816–817 KGB New York to Moscow, 30 May 1943;
- 899 KGB New York to Moscow, 11 June 1943;
- 1142 KGB New York to Moscow, 10 August 1944;
- 174–176 KGB Mexico City to Moscow, 29 December 1943;
- 193–194 Mexico City to Moscow, 14 March 1944. pg.1
- 193–194 Mexico City to Moscow, 14 March 1944. pg.2
- 193–194 Mexico City to Moscow, 14 March 1944. pg.3
- 193–194 Mexico City to Moscow, 14 March 1944. pg.4
- 193–194 Mexico City to Moscow, 14 March 1944. pg.5
- 212 KGB Mexico City to Moscow, 25 March 1944;
- 261–262 KGB Mexico City to Moscow, 16 April 1944;
- 281 KGB Mexico City to Moscow, 21 April 1944;
- 553–554 KGB Mexico City to Moscow, 29 June 1944;
- 893 KGB Mexico City to Moscow, 28 November 1944;
- 237 KGB Moscow to Mexico City, 20 April 1944;
- 248 KGB Moscow to Mexico City, 27 April 1944;
- 288 KGB Moscow to Mexico City, 11 May 1944;
- 511 KGB Moscow to Mexico City, 24 August 1944;
- 626 KGB Moscow to Mexico City, 29 October 1944;
- 634 KGB Moscow to Mexico City, 5 November 1944.
