= Jacob Epstein (banker) =

Polish banker (1771–1843)

- Jakub Epstein
- Born: 1771
- Died: 16 August 1843 (aged 71–72)
- Spouse: Henrietta Glickson
- Children: Adam Epstein; Herman Epstein; Jan Epstein; Józef Epstein

Jacob Epstein (1771 – 16 August 1843) was a Polish banker and philanthropist of Jewish descent. In early manhood he went to Warsaw, where he succeeded in amassing a large fortune and became one of the most prominent figures in the old Polish capital. He was the first Jew in Warsaw to discard the old-style Jewish garb and to dress himself and his family in European fashion. In the November Uprising of 1830–31 Epstein took the part of the faction in favor of independence for Poland, and was an officer in the insurrectionary army; but later he seems to have completely regained the favor of the Russian government, as is evidenced by his appointment as banker of the treasury commission of the Kingdom of Poland in 1838.

Epstein was the founder and president of the Jewish hospital at Warsaw, on which he spent large sums and which he raised to a high standard of efficiency. Tsar Nicholas I, who visited the institution, conferred on Epstein the title of "hereditary honorary citizen." The high respect in which Epstein was held by the Christian population of Warsaw is best indicated by his election to membership in the commission of charities, which consisted mostly of Polish noblemen.
