= Simon Epstein =

Israeli economist and historian

Simon Epstein (Hebrew: סיימון אפשטיין; born in 1947 in Paris) is an Israeli economist and historian.

== Career ==
Epstein obtained a doctorate degree in political science at Pantheon-Sorbonne University. He moved to Jerusalem in 1974 and worked as an economist for the Israeli Ministry of Finance.

Since 1982, his main research areas have been antisemitism and racism.

== Published works ==
- L'Antisémitisme français aujourd'hui et demain, Belfond, 1984
- Cry of Cassandra: the resurgence of European anti-semitism, National Press, A Zenith, 1985
- Les Chemises jaunes : chronique d'une extrême-droite raciste en Israël, Calmann-Lévy, Histoire contemporaine, 1990
- Les institutions israélites françaises de 1919 à 1939 : solidarité juive et lutte contre l'antisémitisme, Paris 1, 1990
- Les institutions israélites françaises de 1929 à 1939 : solidarité juive et lutte contre l'antisémitisme, Lille 3 University, ANRT, 1990
- Cyclical patterns in antisemitism: the dynamics of anti-Jewish violence in western countries since the 1950s, Analysis of current trends in antisemitism/ACTA, No. 2, Hebrew University of Jerusalem, Vidal Sassoon International Center for the Study of Antisemitism, 1993
- Histoire du peuple juif au XXe siècle : de 1914 à nos jours, Paris, Hachette Littératures, 1982, series Pluriel, No. 993, 2000
- Les Dreyfusards sous l'Occupation, Albin Michel, series Bibliothèque Albin Michel de l'histoire, 2001
- Storia del popolo ebraico, Seam, 2001
- Un paradoxe français : antiracistes dans la Collaboration, antisémites dans la Résistance. Bibliothèque Albin Michel. Histoire. Paris: Albin Michel. 2008. ISBN 978-2-226-17915-9.
- 1930, une année dans l'histoire du peuple juif, Stock, 2012
