= Richard Ebstein =

American geneticist (born 1943)

- Born: Richard Paul Ebstein; February 19, 1943 (age 83)
- Education: Union College; Yale University
- Known for: Neuroeconomics
- Scientific career
- Fields: Behavioral genetics
- Workplaces: Hebrew University; National University of Singapore
- Thesis: Ribosomes and polysomes in diapause and development of the Cecropia silkmoth (1968)

Richard Paul Ebstein (born February 19, 1943) is an American-israeli behavioral geneticist. He is Professor in the Department of Psychology at the National University of Singapore, as well as Professor Emeritus in the Psychology Department at Hebrew University. He is known for his research on the genetics of human social behaviors, such as political ideology, novelty seeking, and dancing.
