= Maksim Zuyev =

Maksim Zuyev (Russian: Макси́м Зу́ев; born November 11, 1975 in Kaliningrad – died March 18, 2010) was a journalist and blogger who spent his entire life in Kaliningrad promoting human rights.

== Death ==
On March 13, 2010, Zuyev disappeared from his apartment in Kaliningrad. His body was subsequently discovered on March 18 with "multiple stab wounds" as the apparent cause of death. Maksim had been vocal about the Russian federal governments' intrusive import tariffs on the city of Kaliningrad. Zuyev's murder occurred during the same week of March 20 that saw massive protests being held by human rights leaders in Kaliningrad and across Russia.

== List of awards and positions ==
=== Co ===
- Jury Regional Internet contest, The Baltic Wide Web (2000)

=== Producer ===
- I Regional Internet Festival "Amber string" (2003)
- II Regional Internet Festival "Amber string" (2007)
- Annual Regional Internet-parties (2004, 2005, 2006, 2007)

=== Judge ===
- Nationwide Internet contest "Golden Site" (2003)

=== Jury ===
- Irkutsk Regional Internet contest (2003)
- Rostov Regional Internet contest (2003)
- Nationwide Internet contest "Golden Site" (2002)
- International Internet-competition "Golden Spider" (2002)
- Rostov Regional Internet contest (2001)

=== Member ===
- Journalists' Union of Russia
- Russia Mediasoyuz

=== Winner ===
- Award Interior Minister (1999)
