= Frydag =

German noble family

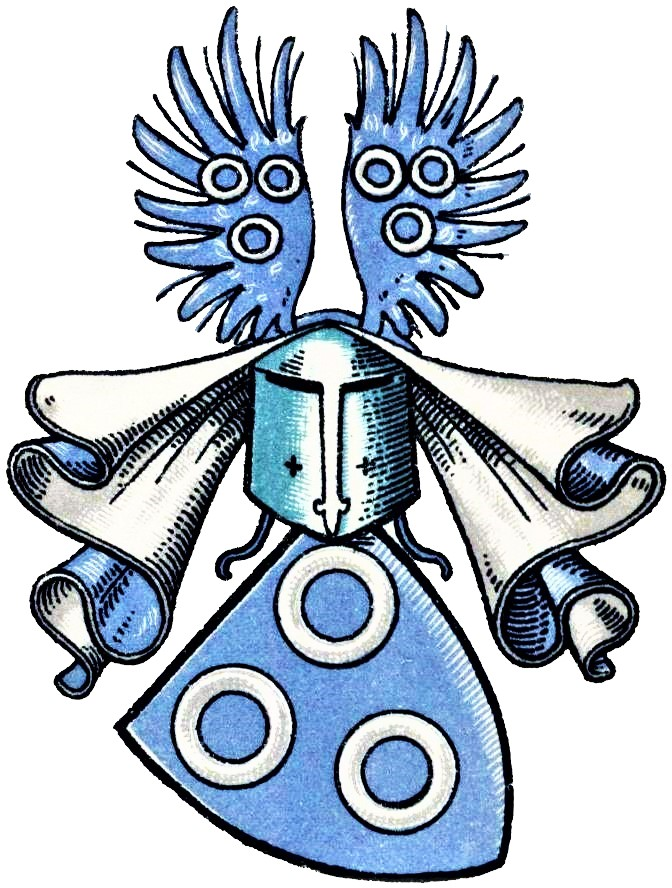
- Coat of arms in the coat of arms book of the Westphalian nobility, 1902
- Language: German

Origin
- Region of origin: Germany

Other names
- Variant forms: Vrydach, Freytag, Freydag

The Frydag family, also spelled Vrydach, Freytag, Freydag and various other slightly different spellings, is a German noble family, known since the beginning of the 14th century, that originated in Uradel in Westphalia.

== Background ==
The family was first documented between 1198 and 1217 in the person of Wecelo Vriedach. At the end of the 13th century, Westphalian aristocrats, amongst them members of the Frydags, moved to Prussia and Livonia to fight in the Teutonic Order for the spread of Christianity. By marrying, in 1574, the heiress of the Gödens Castle in East Frisia, the Frydags gained great prestige and wealth. Since 1644, some family lines have been using the title German: Freiherr (Baron) and, since 1692, other lines have been using the title Graf (Count).

The Freytag family has played an important role in German history, especially as high-ranking knights of the Livonian Confederation, but also, much later, in the person of the supplier of the bomb to assassinate Hitler as part of the 20 July plot, Wessel Freytag von Loringhoven. In addition, the general Hugo von Freytag-Loringhoven is cited frequently as a military writer on the First World War, being awarded the Pour le Mérite in 1916 for his work as a historian. Axel von Freytagh-Loringhoven is cited as an international law expert in the Weimar Republic.

== Name forms ==
The spelling of the different branches of the baronial family includes:

- von Frydag
- von Freytag, called Löringhoff
- Freytag von Loringhoven (or von Freytag-Loringhoven)
- Freytagh von Loringhoven (or von Freytagh-Loringhoven)

Additional name additions were:

- zu Husen (near Syburg), extinguished in 1655
- zu Buddenburg, extinct 1908
- zu Sandfort (at Olfen-Vinnum), extinct in 1717
- zu Goedens, Imperial barons 1649, Imperial counts 1692, extinct 1746
- zu Grevel (near Syburg), extinct in 1546
- zu Drenhusen
- zu Hockerde (near Syburg)

Furthermore, the following spellings were also used: Vriedach, Fridagh, Frydag, Freydag, Frejdag.

The Baltic-born members of the family included the former predicate "Baron" in their name, provided that no substitution was made with its German equivalent, Freiherr.

== History ==
=== Westphalia ===
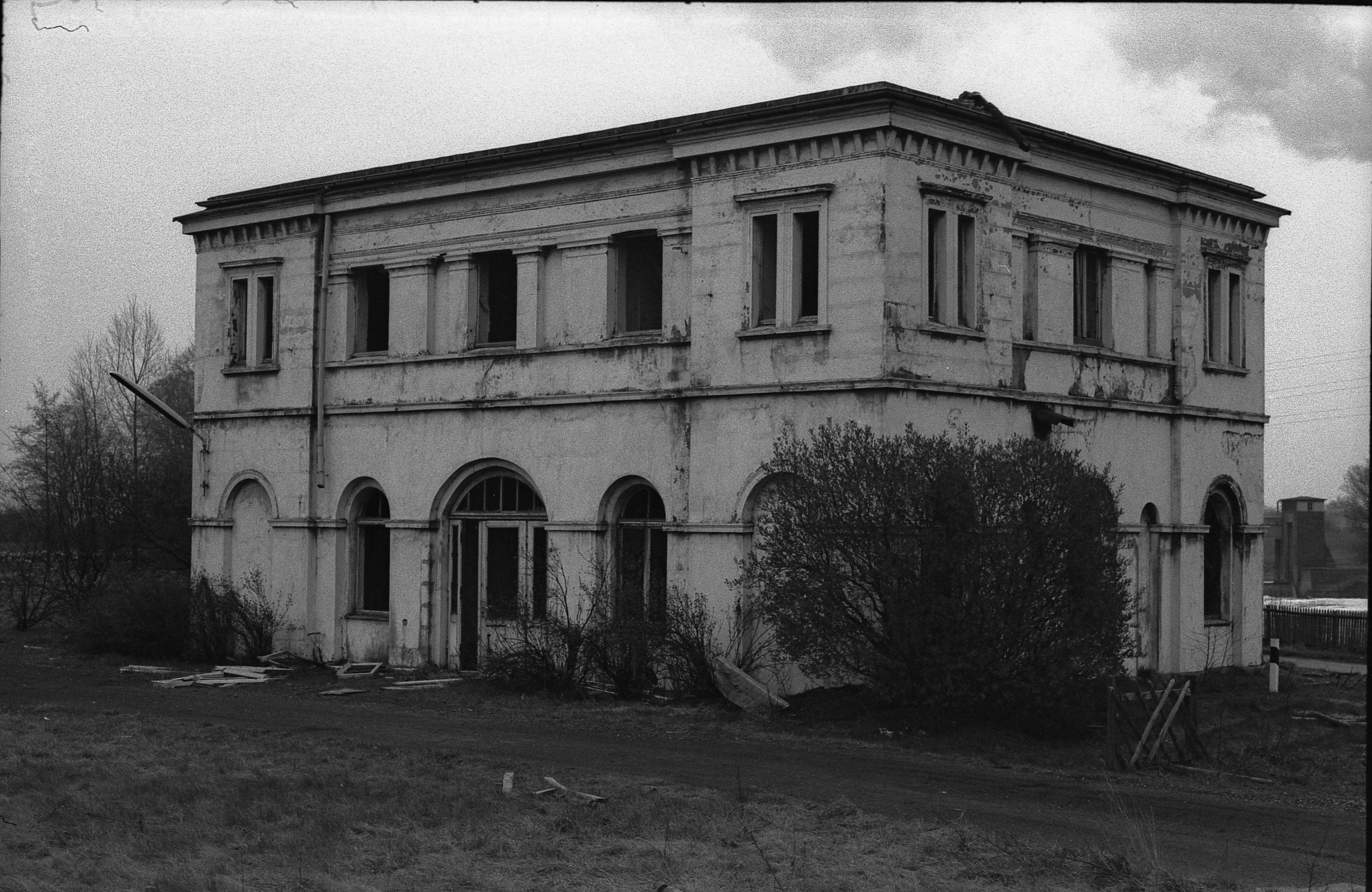
The pavilion of House Buddenburg that was owned by the Frydag line from the 14th century to 1902. The pavilion was but a small part of House Buddenburg

In 1199, the first instance of the name Wecelo Vriedach was found in a document in the library of Count Gottfried of Arnsberg. In 1217, the same person is again mentioned as a witness in a document belonging to the Otto I of Oldenburg, Bishop of Münster. In the first half of the 13th century, the family worked as ministeriales for the bishops of Münster and Bishopric of Minden. In the second half, they were with the Archbishop of Cologne and in the abbeys of Essen and abbeys of Herford.

In 1326, in Datteln, a "Godwin Fridag" used a seal with a heraldric coat of arms, consisting of a three ringed crest. Among the other first identifiable carriers of this name, listed by Johann von der Berswordt in the Westphalian family tree in 1624, there are Theodericus Frydag, meles et castelanus (Note: the exact meaning of this title is unknown; a castellan was the vassal in charge of a castle) at Recklinghausen, a witness in a 1366 document stored at the monastery of Oelinghausen, and Konrad Frydag who, in 1316, sold his house and farm in Dortmund to the Dominicans to build a monastery. It is believed that the abbot Meinerus Frydag zu Deutz, who died in 1330, was Konrad's brother. Hermann Frydag, who was probably a son or grandson of Konrad Frydag, accompanied Count Engelbert II of the Mark on his campaigns, and often acted as a witness to documents issued by Count Engelbert in 1370. An Eberhard von Frydag was, from 1385 to 1390, the 21st abbot of the former monastery of Cappenberg Castle. Arnold and Golfried Frydag signed the Unification of the County of Mark on St Laurent's Day, 1419. In 1421, the uninterrupted genealogy of the Frydag family began, when Eberhard Frydag acquired the estate of Loringhoven near Recklinghausen and assumed the name of the estate as his surname. His descendants still bear the name Freytag von Loringhoven. Eberhard also possessed estates in the Duchy of Jülich, which he received from the Counts Palatine.

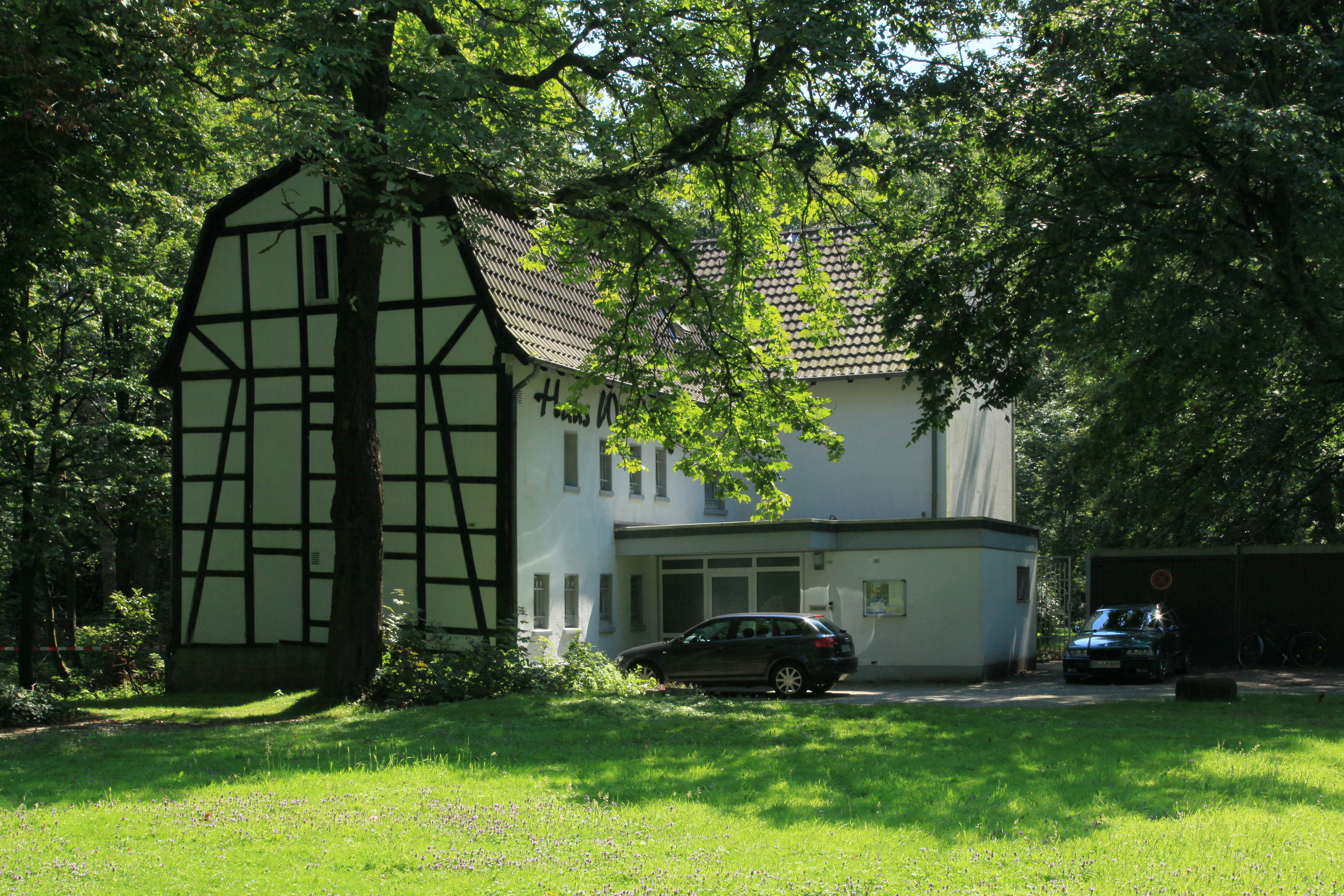
House Wischlingen

Buddenburg House was owned, from the 14th century to 1902, by the Frydag zu Buddenburg line, who also owned Loxten in the 17th century, but the line went extinct in 1908. Grevel House came into the family's possession in 1350, and the local line went extinct in 1546. In the second half of the 14th century, Wischlingen House passed, in equal shares, to the families of Frydag and Ovelacker, via two heiresses. The Frydag part passed to the Syberg family in 1511, via the Plettenberg family. Godert and Arnt Frydag married the heiresses, Aleke and Belke von Husen, and thus came into the possession of Niederhofes and Oberhofes in Husen in Syburg, today Castle Husen and Husen House, which remained in their possession until 1655.

In 1421, Diederich Frydag van den Husen acquired Schörlingen House and Löringhof House, south of Datteln, which, until the 17th and 18th centuries, remained in the possession of the family, but were demolished in 1961. Around 1450, two brothers of the family went to the Baltics, and their seat gave their name to the Baltic branches (see below, German Order). From 1550 to 1719, Sandfort Castle in Olfen was owned by the family. One branch resided in Hockerde, Pentling and Drenhusen, near Syburg. In 1574, the East Frisian village of Gödens came to the family as a dowry, and they built a Baroque palace there, Gödens Castle which was passed on to its present owner, Count Wedel, in 1746 (see below, Ostfriesische line). Georg Wilhelm Freiherr von Frydag, from Gödens, inherited Daren House from his first wife Sophia Johanna von Schade in 1742 and built a new mansion there in 1752. Of all the Westphalian branches, only Freiherr von Frydag, in Daren, flourishes today. Since 1907, the Olfry brickyard in Vechta, founded by August Freiherr von Frydag of Daren, has been family-owned.

=== German Order ===
In 1445, Johann Frydag zu Talberg was one of the knights who assisted Dietrich II. von Moers, Archbishop of Cologne, in the Soest Feud. The archbishop and some of his knights, including Johann Frydag, were taken prisoner during the campaign. To gain their release, they bought their freedom with 32,000 gold florins. This did not deter Dietrich from further battle as, in 1446, he and several other nobles sent a feudal letter of dispute to Duke Reinold von Geldern.

The brothers Andreas Frydag and Johann Frydag moved to Prussia from Löringhoff in the middle of the 15th century, to assist the Teutonic Order in its wars against the Poles. Johann Frydag joined the Teutonic Order. His courage and valour, combined with his intellect, earned him the post of army commander of the Livonian Order, a position he held for 37 years. After appointing Wolter von Plettenberg as Country Marshall (German: Landmeister) in 1489, he was able, in 1491, to end the 200-year civil war in Terra Mariana. This resulted in a period of cultural prosperity and peace that existed until 1561. His brother, Andreas, became a merchant and a father. The third brother, Melchior (b. 1466) is the common progenitor of the line in Prussia in the provinces of Mark and Münster.

The simultaneous existence of German and German-Baltic branches of the family that existed for many centuries - that is, the original line that remained in the homeland and the descendants of mostly younger sons, who had already emigrated to the State of the Teutonic Order and settled there - can also be seen in other noble families, such as the Vietinghoff, the Korff, the Wenge/Lambsdorff, the Grotthus/Grothaus and the Waldburg-Capustigall families.

=== East Frisian line to Gödens ===
With the brothers Franz and Bertold, the family was divided, in the middle of the 16th century, into the East Frisian and Westphalian lines.

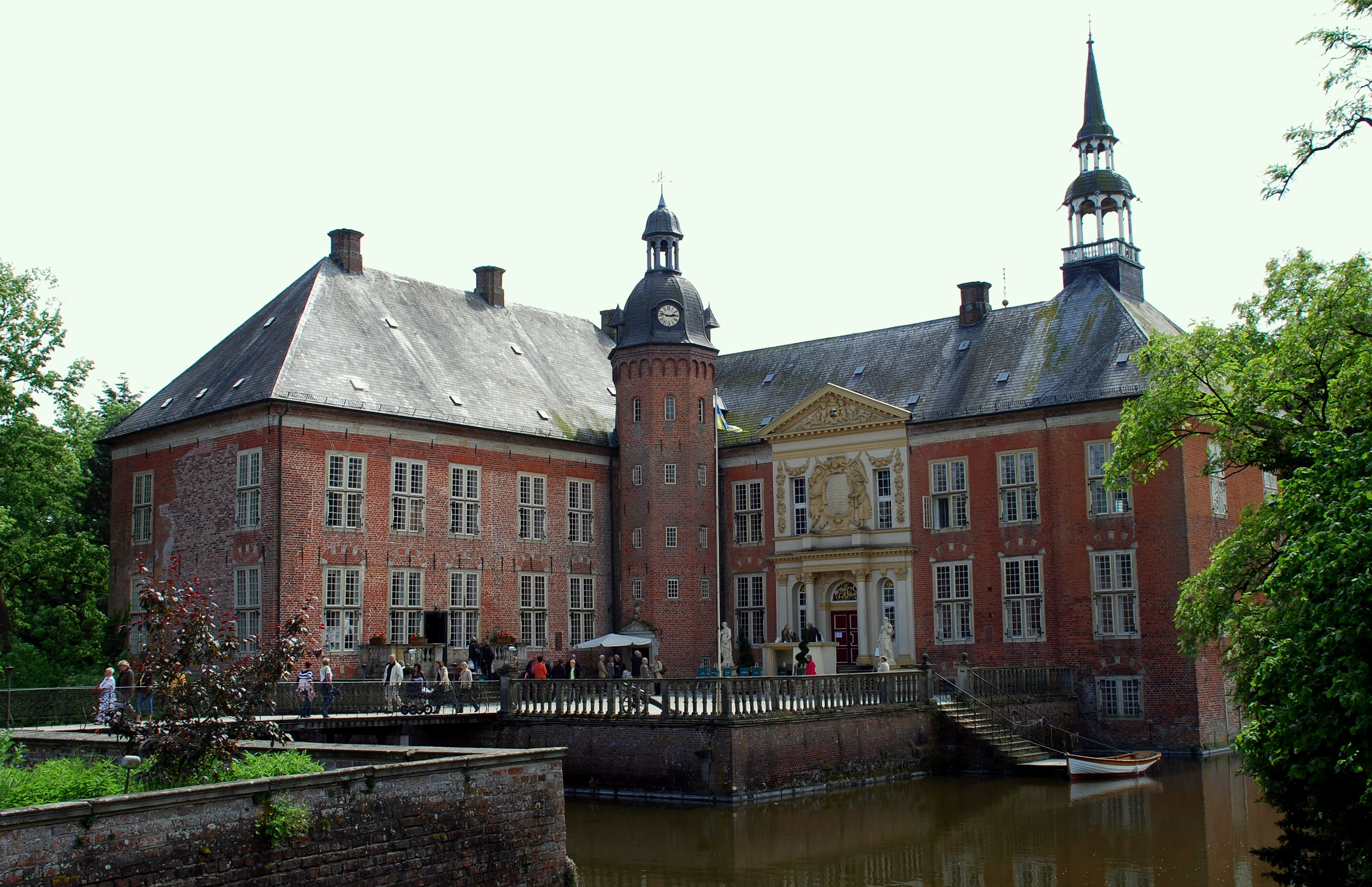
Water Castle, Gödens

Franz Frydag (1555-1606) married Almuth von Olden-Bockum, Almuth Boing's daughter and heiress of the Lordship of Gödens (now Sande). The family thus received Gödens and Uiterstewehr castles in East Frisia in 1574. He was a founder of several lines, one of which was raised soon after to baronial and count status, but went extinct in 1746.

Franz held the position of court judge in Aurich, after he had received the approval for the establishment of a Court of Justice by Count Johan II of East Frisia (1590). When he died, he left behind a daughter Margaret, who was married and had four sons, the oldest of whom, Oldenbockum, used his mother's surname as his baptismal name, a practice that was frequent in northern Germany. He died during the Siege of Rees (1602). His other sons were Haro (1578-1637) and Melchior Ernst (1579-1641), who shared the lordship of the Gödens and Uiterstewehr lines and thus were the originators of two further family lines.

Melchior Ernst (1579-1641) distinguished himself in the Dutch–Portuguese War and married Beate Sophia von Boineburg of the house of Hohnstein Castle. His great-granddaughter, Hendrina, was married to the East Frisian administrator of the Principality of Nassau-Siegen, Nicolaus Moritz Frese zu Hinte and thus was heir to Uiterstewehr manor. This branch of the family became extinct in 1748.

Haro Ernst (1578-1637) was chief of Gödens and Drost (Bailiff) of Leer and was sent, in 1624, to the imperial court in Vienna by the Lower Saxony Kreisständen (Note: the Holy Roman empire was divided into 10 Reichskreise, or circles. Kreisstände were members of that circle.) to lodge a complaint about the invasion of the Catholic League troops under Field Marshal Johann Tserclaes, Count of Tilly and the war contributions he had imposed. Haro had a total of three sons and four daughters by two women, Katharina Freiin von Innhausen and Knyphause and Elisabeth von Haaren, including:

- Herbert, who died in unmarried in 1642 and was Drost to Emden.
- Johann Wilhelm, who married Johanna von Diepenbrock and became the founder of a line in Westphalia.
- Franz Hyko (born 9 January 1606), who lead the main family line as chief of Gödens. He inherited his father's job as Drost to Leer and converted back to Catholicism in 1639, after marrying Elisabeth von Westerholt, heiress of Castle Hackfort. He was promoted on 3 February, 1644, to Imperial Baron by Emperor Ferdinand II. Franz Hyko had several children:
  - Hedwig Orianna (1648-1694), who was the wife of Dodo von Knyphausen, lord of Lütetsburg.
  - Johanna, who was the wife of Count Jan von Beuren.
  - Haro Burchhard (1640-1692), who, along with his brother Franz Heinrich, devoted himself to the legal sciences at German, Dutch and French academies. According to the custom of the time, the two went on the Grand Tour of Europe. On his return, he was appointed chamberlain by Emperor Leopold I. Because of his knowledge, he received the post of Reichshofrat in Vienna and died unmarried in Hamburg as an imperial representative in the Lower Saxony circle. In 1671, he had Gödens Water Castle built in its current form.
  - Karl Philipp (1644-1698), who entered the Order of Malta. After serving in the Imperial Service against the Turks in Hungary, as well as some campaigns on the Mediterranean against the Barbarians, he became Grand Prior in Hungary and died in Valletta in 1698, while he was preparing a new campaign against Tunis.
  - Hico Wilhelm (1645-1711) and Johann Ernst (1649-1703), who chose the clerical profession and entered the Jesuit order. The former died as an excellent pulpit speaker in Mastricht and the latter as rector of the Jesuit College in Halle Brabant.
  - Franz Heinrich (1643-1694), who married Sophia Elisabeth von Aldenburg, the daughter of Count Anton von Aldenburg and his wife Auguste Gräfin zu Sayn-Wittgenstein. He followed the career of his older brother, Haro. He was appointed imperial chamberlain, then Reichshofrat and then, in 1656, ambassador to the court of the principality of the Margraviate of Brandenburg in Berlin. After the death of his brother, Franz inherited his place in the Lower Saxony circle. He and his brothers were promoted by Emperor Leopold, on 2 January, 1692, to the rank of Imperial Count. He had two sons and a daughter:
    - Franz Wilhelm (1686-1722), who entered the Royal Saxon Army. He died a lieutenant colonel in the Garde du Corps during a stay in Vienna in 1722.
    - Burkard Philipp (1685-1746), who followed the diplomatic career of his father and uncle. After returning from universities and travels, he entered the circle of Imperial Chamberlains and Privy Councilors and was accepted by Emperor Charles VI. As an envoy to the Nordic courts in Stockholm and Copenhagen, he developed his diplomatic skills. He kept his position until his death in Copenhagen, where he died in 1746 at the age of 61 years. He was married to Countess Edela Augusta Bielke, the daughter of the royal Danish Major General Count Christoph Bielke (1654-1704). His wife brought the fiefdoms of Lopkeld, Oberaha and Nederowe into the family. His son died shortly after birth. This extinguished the direct line.
    - Maria Juliane (1684-1727), who married the royal Danish general Erhard Friedrich von Wedel-Jarlsberg (1668-1740). Their son, Anton Franz von Wedel (1707-1788), inherited Göden, which has since been in the possession of the Counts of Wedel.

== Coat of Arms ==
The root coat of arms shows in blue three (2: 1) silver rings. On the helmet with blue-silver blankets is a bilateral open signposted flight.

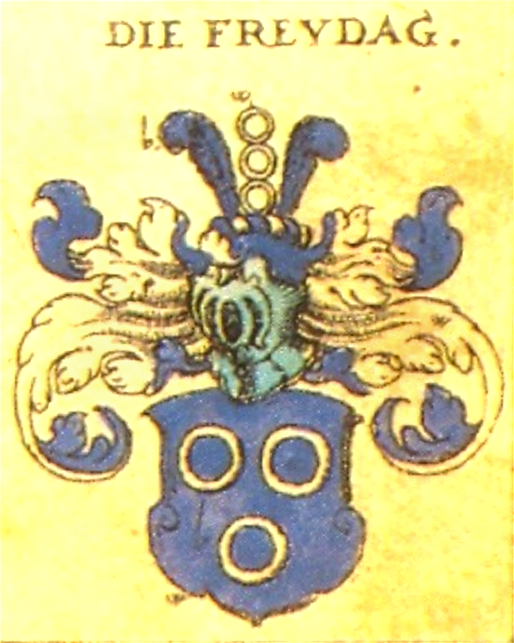
Baroque representation in Siebmachers heraldic book from 1605.

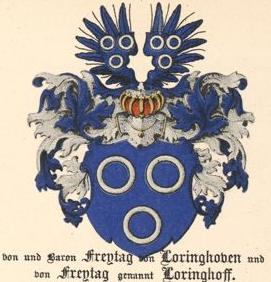
Representation in the Baltisches Wappenbuch in 1882.

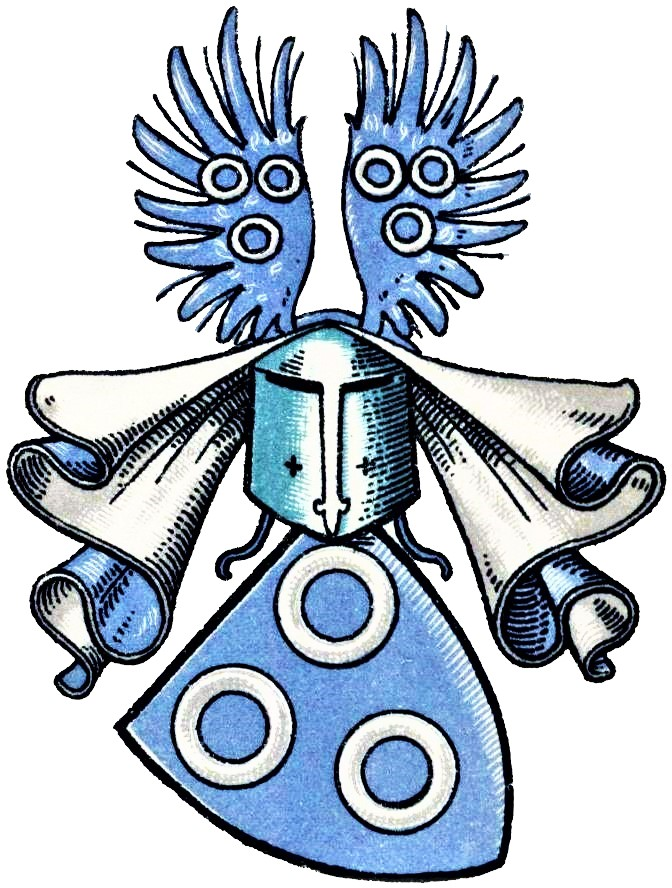
Gothic depiction in the coat of arms book of the Westphalian nobility, 1902

== People with the surname ==
- Johann Freytag von Loringhoven (1483–1494), Landmaster of Livonian Order
- Franz Ico von Frydag (1606–1652), officer and diplomat, member of the Fruitbearing Society
- Georg Wilhelm Frydag zu Gödens (1712–1782), Regierungsrat
- Christian Philipp Frydag zu Gödens (born 1714), Drost of Aurich from 1755
- Christian Wilhelm Freytag von Gödens (died 10 June, 1804), recipient of the Pour le Mérite, Colonel and Commander of the Infantry Regiment Number 10, Drost of Aurich
- Wilhelm von Freytag (1720–1798), Dragoon major near Minden in 1759, field marshal, military teacher of Ernest Augustus, King of Hanover
- Hugo von Freytag-Loringhoven (1855–1924), German general and military historian
- Mathilde Freiin von Freytag-Loringhoven (1860–1941), German painter, graphic artist, art critic, writer and animal psychologist
- Elsa von Freytag-Loringhoven (1874–1927), German Dadaist artist
- Axel von Freytagh-Loringhoven (1878–1942), German international lawyer, law professor and German National People's Party member of the Reichstag until June 1933, then a supporter of the Nazi Party
- Wessel von Freytag-Loringhoven (1899–1944), Baltic German member of the resistance against Adolf Hitler
- Frank Baron Freytag von Loringhoven (1910–1977), German genealogist and journalist
- Bruno von Freytag-Löringhoff (1912–1996), German philosopher, mathematician and epistemologist
- Bernd von Freytag-Loringhoven (1914–2007), Baltic-German general
- Robert Freitag, né Robert Peter Freytag (1916–2010), Austrian-Swiss stage and screen actor and film director
- Waltraud Freydag (1940–2010), first wife of Prince Friedrich Wilhelm of Prussia, eldest member of the defunct German Royal House of Prussia
- Bettina von Freytag genannt Löringhoff (bor. 1943), German archaeologist at the University of Tübingen
- Arndt Freiherr Freytag von Loringhoven (born 12 November, 1956), German diplomat, NATO intelligence chief and former Vice President of the Federal Intelligence Service, son of Lt. General Baron Bernd Freytag von Loringhoven
- Tatjana Freytag von Loringhoven (born 1980), Austrian equestrian rider and 2002 FEI World Equestrian Games participant

== Gallery ==
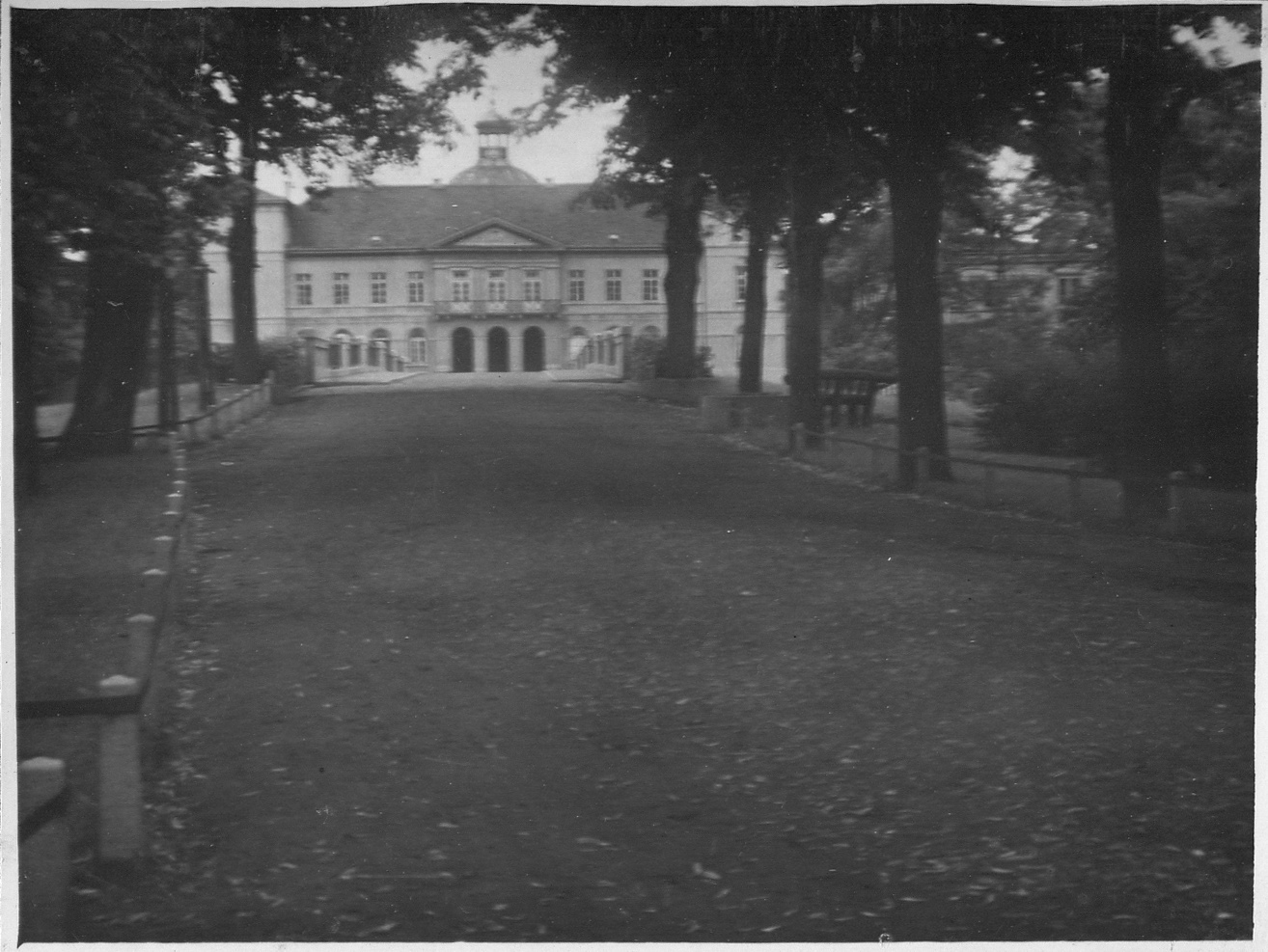
Main House of Buddenburg

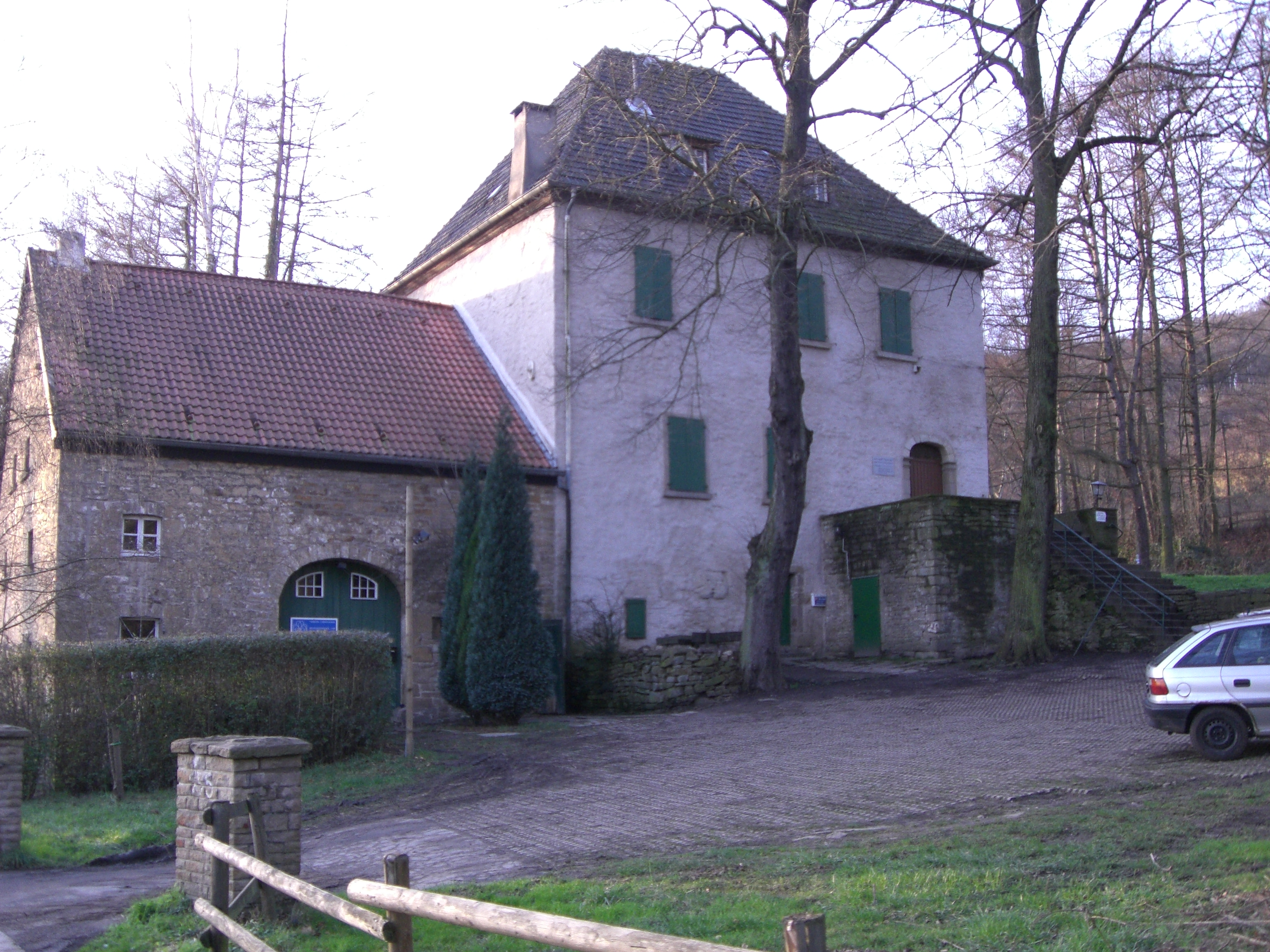
Castle Husen

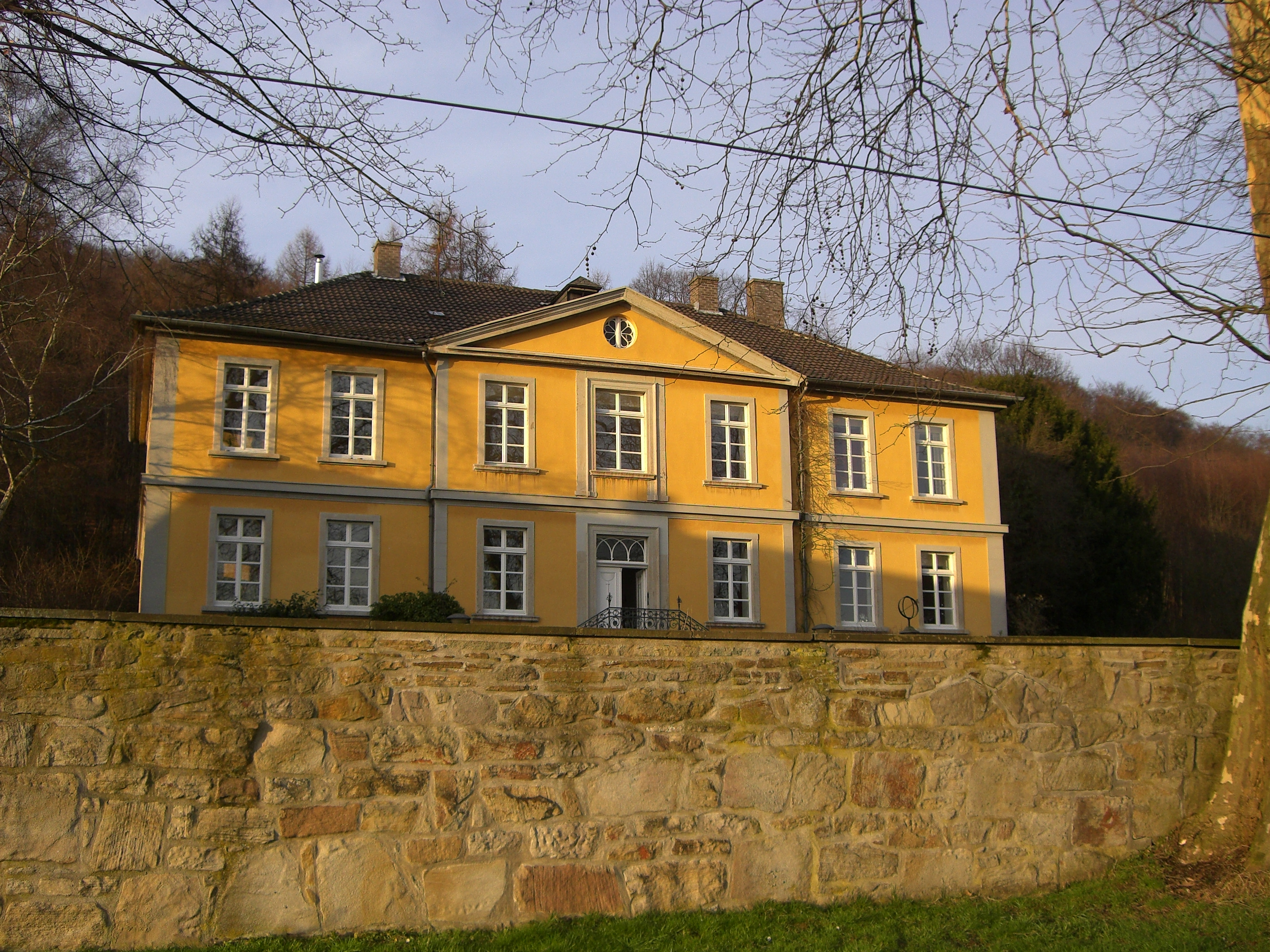
House Husen

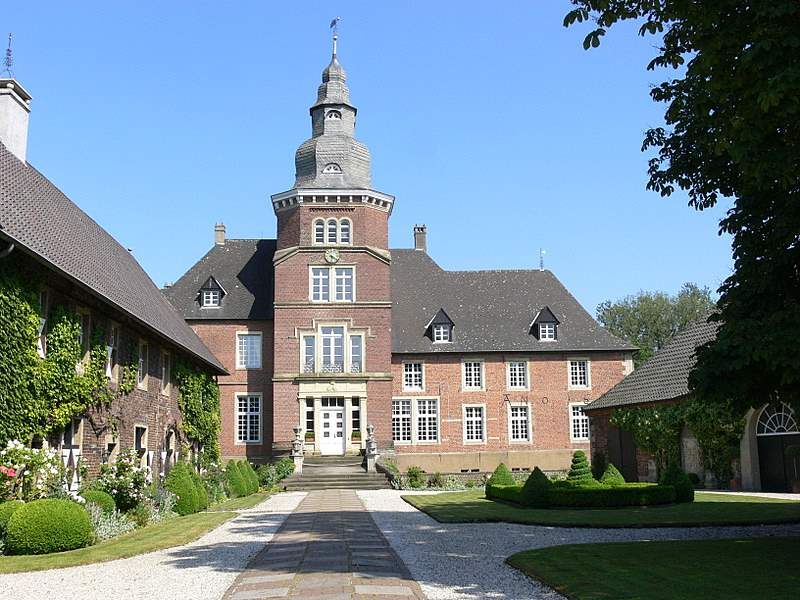
Sandfort Castle acquired by the Frydag family in 1550

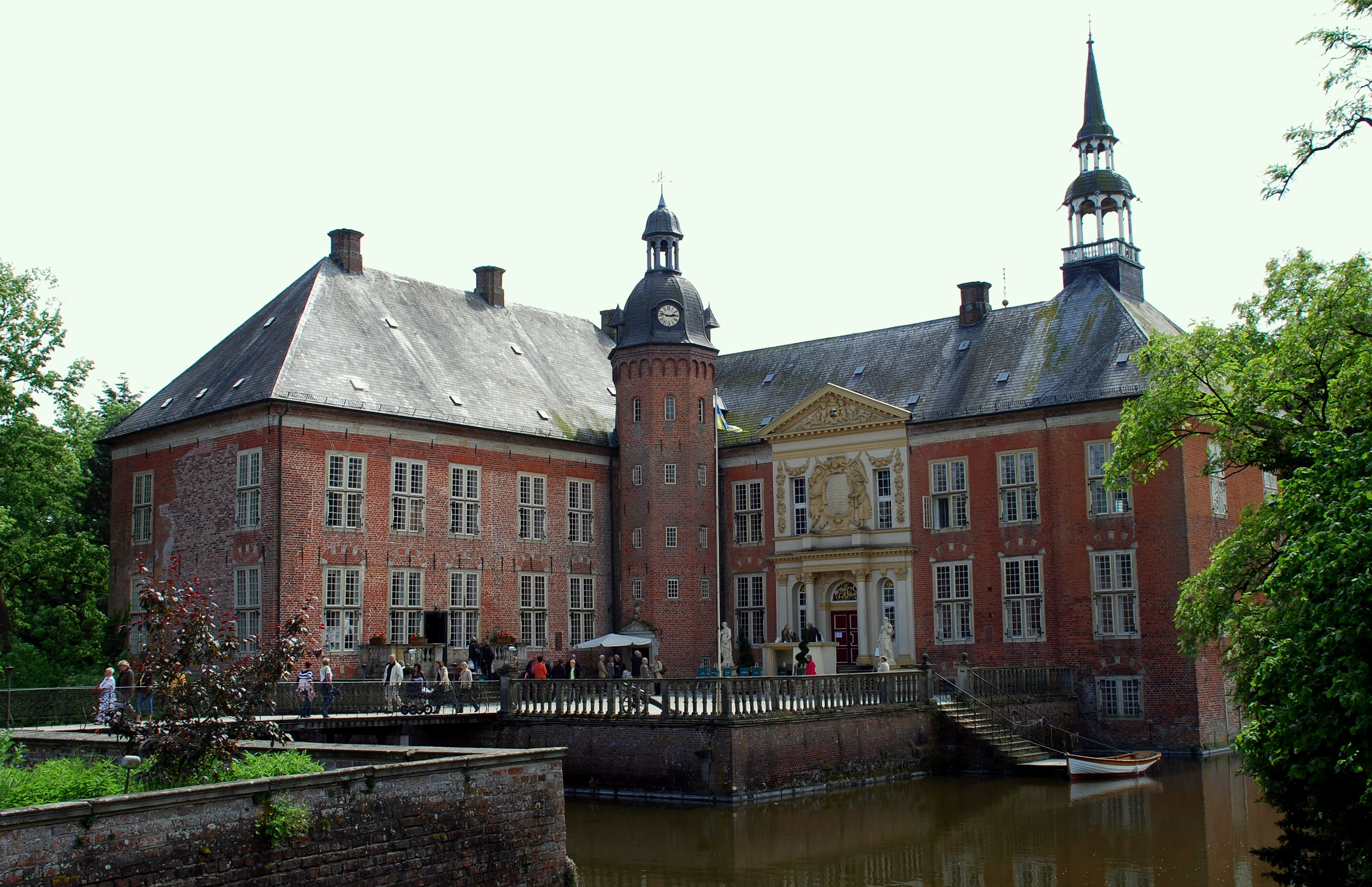
Gödens Castle

== Literature ==
- Stavenhagen, Oskar (1939). Genealogical Handbook of the Courland Knights, Vol. 1. Baltic biographical dictionaries: Görlitz. p. 254.
- Genealogical Handbook of the Nobility, Volume 61, 1975,
- Westphalian document, Westfälisches Urkunden-Buch, Bd.II, Nr. 576, Volume III, Nr. 117
- Goth. frhrl. Taschenbuch, A 1896, 1898, 1934, 1942
- Genealogical Handbook of the Nobility, A 2, 1956; A 61, 1975, Frhr. 18, 1995;
- Deeters, Walter (1997). "von Frydag". Biographisches Lexikon für Ostfries (in German). Vol. 2. Aurich: Ostfriesische Landschaft. pp. 128–129. ISBN 3-932206-00-2.
- Transehe-Roseneck, Astaf von (1929). Genealogisches Handbuch der Baltischen Ritterschaften: hrsg. von der Verbänden des livländischen, estländischen und kurländischen Stammadels, Teil: Kurland [Genealogical Handbook of the Baltic Knighthoods: published by the associations of the Livonian, Estonian and Courlandian main nobility, Part: Courland] (in German). Görlitz: erband des livländischen Stammadels. Bearb. von Astaf v. Transehe-Roseneck. OCLC 164891366.
- Elgentsierna, Gustaf (1926). Den introducerade svenska adelns ättartavlor [An introduction to Swedish nobility's genealogical tables] (in Swedish). Stockholm: P. A. Norstedt & Söners Förlag.
- Nederlands Adelsboek 1908
- von Krusenstjern, Georg; Ritterschaft, Livländische; Ritterschaft, Öselsche (1963). Die Landmarschälle und Landräte der Livländischen und der Öselschen Ritterschaft in Bildnissen [Portraits of the Land Marshals and Land Councillors of the Livonian and Oeselian Knighthoods] (in German). Hamburg: H.v. Hofmann. OCLC 14933008.
- Freytag-Löringhoff, Bruno von (2002). Wilhelm Schickards Tübinger Rechenmaschine von 1623 [Wilhelm Schickard's Tübingen calculating machine of 1623]. Kleine Tübinger Schriften, Volume 4 (in German) (5th ed.). Tübingen: Universität Tübingen, Kulturamt. ISBN 3-910090-48-6. OCLC 53144772.
- Freytag von Loringhoven, Bernd; Alançon, François d' (2006). Dans le Bunker de Hitler: 23 juillet 1944-29 avril 1945 (in German). Paris: Perrin. ISBN 2-262-02478-2.
- Freytag von Loringhoven, Bernd; Alançon, François d'; Freytag von Loringhoven, Bernd (2006). Mit Hitler im Bunker: die letzten Monate im Führerhauptquartier ; Juli 1944 - April 1945 [With Hitler in the bunker: the last months in the Führer Headquarters; July 1944 - April 1945] (in German) (1. Aufl ed.). Berlin: wjs-Verl. ISBN 3-937989-14-5.
- von Frydag, Georg Wilhelm (1970). Chronik der Familie von Frydag in Daren [Chronicle of the von Frydag family in Daren]. Selbstverl. OCLC 254404610.
- Gammel, Irene (2002). Baroness Elsa : gender, dada, and everyday modernity : a cultural biography. Cambridge, Mass.: MIT Press. ISBN 9780262072311. OCLC 62197061.
- Grimm, Sabine (2011). Adelslinien - Die Herren von Frydag Unruhige Zeiten - Band 7. Norderstedt. ISBN 978-3-8423-2926-3. OCLC 863697619.
- Johann Samuel Ersch (1850). Allgemeine encyclopädie der wissenschaften und künste in alphabetischer folge von genannten schrifts bearbeitet und herausgegeben von J. S. Ersch und J. G. Gruber ... [General encyclopedia of the sciences and arts in alphabetical order of the aforementioned writings, edited and published by J. S. Ersch and J. G. Gruber.] (in German). J. f. Gleditsch. p. 475.
- Alexander von Werdum; Sebastian Eberhard Jhering (1845). Hironimus Grestius's Reimchronik von Harlingerland, nebst Alexander von Werdum's Genealogie der Häuptlinge von Gödens &c., und S.E. Jhering's Beschreibung der Herrlichkeit Gödens [Hironimus Grestius's Rhymed Chronicle of Harlingerland, together with Alexander von Werdum's Genealogy of the Chieftains of Gödens &c., and S.E. Jhering's Description of the Glory of Gödens] (in German). Hergeröder. p. 40.
