= Freitag =

Freitag is the German word for Friday. Freitag or Freytag may refer to:

== People ==
- Amanda Freitag (born 1972), American TV chef
- Arny Freytag (born 1950), American photographer
- Barbara Freitag (born 1941), German-born Brazilian sociologist and author
- Bernd von Freytag-Loringhoven (1914–2007), Baltic German general
- Catherine Freitag Clarke, American biochemist
- Dagmar Freitag (born 1953), German politician
- Elsa von Freytag-Loringhoven (1874–1927), Dada artist
- Herta Freitag (1908–2000), Austrian-American mathematician
- Holger Freitag (born 1963), German ski jumper
- Georg Wilhelm Friedrich Freytag (1788–1861), German philologist
- Gustav Freytag (1816–1895), German dramatist
  - Freytag's pyramid
- Jacques Freitag (born 1982), South African high jumper
- John Freitag (1877–1932), American rower
- Lori Freitag, American mathematician and computer scientist
- Meike Freitag (born 1979), German swimmer
- Richard Freitag (born 1991), German ski jumper
- Walter Freitag (1889–1958), German politician
- Willy Freitag (fl. 1960s), American soccer player
- Freytag, a surname

== Other uses ==
- Freitag, der 13. (Friday the Thirteenth), a 1949 West German film
- Der Freitag, a German weekly newspaper published in Berlin
- Freitag aus Licht, the fifth opera of Karlheinz Stockhausen's Licht cycle
- Freitag Homestead, a historic farm in Washington, Green County, Wisconsin, U.S.

== See also ==
- Wessel von Freytag-Loringhoven (1899–1944), Baltic German member of the resistance against Adolf Hitler
