= Freytag-Loringhoven =

Baltic German noble family

Freytag von Loringhoven
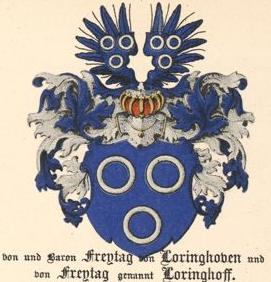
- Coat of arms (1882)
- Language: German

Origin
- Meaning: from Löringhoff nearby Datteln, Westphalia
- Region of origin: Germany, Latvia

Other names
- Variant forms: Freitag, Freytag

The Freytag von Loringhoven is a German noble family that originated in Westphalia. It was an Uradel family whose name is also spelled as Vrydach, Frydag, Freydag and various other slightly different spellings.

== History ==
The surname was first documented in 1198 and 1217.

At the end of the 13th century, Westphalian nobles, including members of the Freytags, moved to Prussia and Livonia to fight for and with the Teutonic Order to spread Christianity.

== Notable members ==
- Arndt Freytag von Loringhoven (1956-), diplomat
- Bernd Freytag von Loringhoven (1914–2007), Baltic German general
- Elsa von Freytag-Loringhoven (1874–1927), Dada artist and poet.
- Evert Baron Freytag von Loringhoven, Righteous Among the Nations.
- Hugo von Freytag-Loringhoven (1855–1924), German general and military historian
- Johann Freytag von Loringhoven (circa 1430–1494), Master (Landmeister) of the Livonian Order
- Wessel Freytag von Loringhoven (1899–1944), Baltic German member of the resistance against Adolf Hitler
- Lieutenant Baron von Freytag-Loringhoven, died in a 1911 plane crash
