= Freytag =

Freytag is a German surname, meaning Friday. Notable people with the surname include:

- Adam Freytag (1608–1650), Polish mathematician and military engineer
- Arny Freytag (born 1950), American photographer
- Bernd von Freytag-Loringhoven (1914–2007), Baltic German general
- Elsa von Freytag-Loringhoven (1874–1927), Dada-artist
- Fredericka Freytag (1890-1992), American psychiatrist and hypnotherapist
- Georg Wilhelm Friedrich Freytag (1788–1861), German philologist
- Gustav Freytag (1816–1895), German dramatist
- Heinrich Hermann Freytag (1759–1811), German/Dutch organ-builder
- Maria Freytag (1835–1873), Polish ballet dancer
- Michael Freytag (born 1958), German politician
- Freytag's pyramid
- Siegfried Freytag (1919–2003), German fighter pilot
- Susanne Freytag (born 1957), German musician, Propaganda
- Wessel von Freytag-Loringhoven (1899–1944), Baltic German member of the resistance against Adolf Hitler
- Wilhelm von Freytag (1720–1798), German field-marshall in Hanoverian service

== See also ==
- Freitag (disambiguation)
