= Gerhard Boldt =

German military officer

- Born: 24 January 1918; Lübeck
- Died: 7 May 1981 (aged 63); Lübeck
- Military career
- Allegiance: Nazi Germany
- Branch: Army
- Rank: Rittmeister der Reserve
- Conflicts: World War II
- Awards: Knight's Cross of the Iron Cross

Gerhard Boldt (24 January 1918 – 10 May 1981) was an officer in the German Army (Heer) who wrote about his experiences during World War II.

== World War II service ==
On 4 August 1943, Boldt was awarded a Knight's Cross of the Iron Cross for extreme bravery. He was a senior-lieutenant (Oberleutnant) with the 58th Infantry Division on the Eastern Front. Boldt also served as a cavalry officer.

== Berlin 1945 ==
During the last months of World War II, Boldt was seconded to Reinhard Gehlen's military intelligence staff. He was stationed in German dictator Adolf Hitler's Führerbunker, located below the Reich Chancellery garden in central Berlin. Boldt reported to General Hans Krebs and was summoned to a daily briefing session with Hitler, his generals, and closest associates - in particular Martin Bormann, Hermann Göring, and Joseph Goebbels. Boldt had an opportunity to observe the leading members of the Nazi hierarchy during the Battle of Berlin. After the war, he wrote about his experiences during the last days in Nazi-held Berlin.

=== Background ===
By 21 April 1945, Soviet Marshal Georgi Zhukov's 1st Belorussian Front had broken through the defenses of German General Gotthard Heinrici's Army Group Vistula on the Seelow Heights. Having achieved the breakthrough, the Soviets were advancing towards Berlin with little to stop them. Hitler, ignoring the facts, saw salvation in the ragtag units commanded by General Felix Steiner. Steiner's command became known as "Army Detachment Steiner" (Armeeabteilung Steiner). Army Detachment Steiner was an army that existed primarily on paper: it was something more than a corps but less than an army. Hitler ordered Steiner to attack the northern flank of the huge salient created by Zhukov's breakthrough; and the German Ninth Army, commanded by General Theodor Busse, which had been pushed to the south of the salient, was ordered to attack northward in a pincer movement.

Late on 21 April, Heinrici called Hans Krebs, chief of the German General Staff (OKH), and told him that Hitler's plan could not be implemented. Heinrici asked to speak to Hitler but was told by Krebs that Hitler was too busy to take his call.

=== Army Detachment Steiner fails to launch an attack ===
Of 22 April, Boldt wrote the following concerning Hitler's breakdown during one of his last conferences:

Hitler interrupted the report to ask what had happened to General Felix Steiner's offensive ... There was a long silence and then Hitler was told that the attack had never been launched, and that the withdrawal from Berlin of several units of Steiner's army, on Hitler's orders, had so weakened the front that the Russians had broken through into Berlin.

That was too much for Hitler. He asked everyone except Wilhelm Keitel, Alfred Jodl, Krebs and Wilhelm Burgdorf to leave the room ...

Then Hitler started jumping up and down, while he ranted and raved. His face turned white and purple in turns, and he was shaking all over. His voice kept breaking, as he screamed out the words disloyalty, cowardice, treachery, and insubordination. There followed accusations against the Wehrmacht and the Waffen-SS, of the kind that previous explosions had brought out in somewhat milder form. His outburst culminated in the oath that he would remain in Berlin, with the Berliners, that he would lead the fight personally -- let all who wish to desert him and the city do so now. And then something happened that none of those present had ever seen or expected to see. Hitler suddenly returned to his chair and collapsed. He stammered out: "It's all up ... the war is lost ... I shall shoot myself."

Almost immediately after Hitler's plan for Steiner failed to launch, a new plan was created. The new plan involved General Walther Wenck and his Twelfth Army. Wenck's army faced the Americans to the west. The new plan had Wenck attack with his army to the east, link up with the Ninth Army of General Theodor Busse, and relieve Berlin.

Of 25 to 26 April, Boldt wrote the following about Hitler's order to flood the underground railway:

When we arrived for the talk, Hitler rose and we followed him into the conference room. Though no encouraging message from General Walther Wenck (Twelfth Army) had been received, Hitler continued to clutch at that straw. Regardless of the fate of the starving, thirsting, and dying population, he was determined to postpone the inevitable end even further. And then he gave one of the most inhuman of all his orders: because the Russians had repeatedly thrown back the German lines by advancing through the underground and other railway tunnels to attack the German forces from the rear, he now detailed special units to open the locks of the river Spree, thus flooding the railway tunnels south of the Reich Chancellery. These tunnels were crammed with civilians and thousands of wounded. They were no longer of interest to him. His insane order cost the lives of very many people.

=== Last days in the Führerbunker ===
Of 28 April, Boldt documented the following discussions between Bormann, Krebs, and Burgdorf:

At about 2:00 am, I lay down completely exhausted and tried to catch a few hours of sleep. Noise drifted across from the room next door, where Martin Bormann, Hans Krebs, and Wilhelm Burgdorf sat carousing. I must have been asleep for two-and-one-half hours when Bernd (Bernd von Freytag-Loringhoven) in the bunk beneath me woke me up. "You really are missing something, just listen to that!" he whispered. Burgdorf was shouting at Bormann: "Believe me, I have done my very best to smooth things over between Hitler and the Army, so much so that the Army has called me a traitor to the German Officers' Corps. Now I realize that they were right all along, that my work was in vain, my idealism misdirected, no, naive and stupid." Breathing heavily, he paused for a moment. Krebs tried to calm him down and begged him to spare Bormann's feelings.

But Burgdorf went on regardless: "Just leave me to it, Hans, it has to be said for once. In forty-eight hours it may well be too late. Our young officers went into battle full of faith and idealism. They went to their death by the hundred-thousand. But for what? For their Fatherland, for Germany's greatness and future? For a decent life? In their hearts they did, but nowhere else. They died for you, for your pockets, for your boundless ambitions. Thinking they were dying for a just cause, our youth allowed themselves to be bled to death on the battlefields of Europe, sacrificing millions of innocent lives, while you, the Party leaders, waxed richer and richer, living it up like lords, accumulating untold riches, stealing vast estates, building castles, reveling in luxury, deceiving and milking the nation. Our ideals, our morals, our faith, our soul -- all these you have ground into dirt; mankind was only a stepping stone for your insatiable greed. You have destroyed our ancient culture, you have broken up our nation. That is your only achievement!"

The general's voice had risen to a roar. Now the bunker was quite still. We could hear his breath come in gasps. Then we heard Bormann's cool, superior, and oily voice. All he had to say was this: "My dear fellow, do you really have to be so personal? Even if the others have filled their pockets, I myself am free of blame. That I swear to you by all I hold dear. Cheers my friend, and drink up!"

Early on 29 April, Freytag-Loringhoven informed Boldt that Hitler had married Eva Braun. Boldt was laughing at the news when Krebs came from behind a curtain and chastised him: "Have you gone quite mad? How dare you laugh so shamelessly at your highest commander?"

=== Escape ===
On 29 April, communications were down, the Soviets were closing in, and many were morbidly anticipating Hitler's suicide and wondering what the future held. Boldt's friend, von Freytag-Loringhoven, had obtained permission for them to leave. That evening, Boldt left the Führerbunker with von Freytag-Loringhoven and Burgdorf's assistant, Lieutenant-Colonel Rudolf Weiss. The men had been tasked with trying to reach General Wenck's Twelfth Army, and requesting relief for Berlin. Weiss became separated from his two companions and was captured. He endured five years of captivity in a Soviet POW camp in Poland. At night when Boldt and von Freytag-Loringhoven were hiding in a ditch in a forest, Boldt attempted to commit suicide by taking an overdose of morphine. Von Freytag-Loringhoven forced him to regorge the morphine and thus saved his life. On 12 May, after several close encounters with Soviet troops, the two other men parted company; Boldt going north to Lubeck and von Loringhoven heading towards Leipzig to join his wife and son. Boldt reached his family in Lubeck. There he was arrested by British troops and sent to an internment camp.

== Post-war ==
Boldt became a writer. He wrote Hitler's Last Days: An Eye-Witness Account (ISBN 1-84415-361-4). This book was translated by Sandra Bance and was used for the films Hitler: The Last Ten Days (1973) and Downfall (2004; Der Untergang). He died on 7 May 1981.

== Controversy ==
Writer Mayo Mohs claimed that Boldt may not have been present in the Führerbunker during Hitler's last days. Mohs wrote in Time magazine, that Boldt "constructs Hitler's very last days from already published sources—since he was not there." Other sources, such as Bernd von Freytag-Loringhoven's own account, do reference Boldt having been in the Führerbunker.

== Awards ==
- Iron Cross (1939)
  - 2nd Class
  - 1st Class
- Knight's Cross of the Iron Cross as Oberleutnant in Aufklärungs-Abteilung 158

== See also ==
- Bibliography of Adolf Hitler

== Bibliography ==
- Beevor, Antony (2002). Berlin: The Downfall 1945. Viking-Penguin Books. ISBN 978-0-670-03041-5.
- de Boer, Sjoerd (2021). Escaping Hitler's Bunker: The Fate of the Third Reich Leaders. Frontline Books. ISBN 978-1-52679-269-3.
- Dollinger, Hans (1967) [1965]. The Decline and Fall of Nazi Germany and Imperial Japan. New York: Bonanza Books. ISBN 978-0-517-01313-7.
- Fellgiebel, Walther-Peer (2000) [1986]. Die Träger des Ritterkreuzes des Eisernen Kreuzes 1939–1945 — Die Inhaber der höchsten Auszeichnung des Zweiten Weltkrieges aller Wehrmachtteile [The Bearers of the Knight's Cross of the Iron Cross 1939–1945 — The Owners of the Highest Award of the Second World War of all Wehrmacht Branches] (in German). Friedberg, Germany: Podzun-Pallas. ISBN 978-3-7909-0284-6.
- Joachimsthaler, Anton (1999) [1995]. The Last Days of Hitler: The Legends, The Evidence, The Truth. Brockhampton Press. ISBN 978-1-86019-902-8.
- Kershaw, Ian (2008). Hitler: A Biography. New York: W. W. Norton & Company. ISBN 978-0-393-06757-6.
- Trevor-Roper, Hugh (1992) [1947]. The Last Days of Hitler. USA: University of Chicago Press. ISBN 0-226-81224-3.
