= Hitler: The Last Ten Days =

- American theatrical release poster
- Directed by: Ennio De Concini
- Written by: Gerhard Boldt; Ennio De Concini; Maria Pia Fusco; Ivan Moffat; Wolfgang Reinhardt
- Produced by: Wolfgang Reinhardt
- Starring: Alec Guinness; Simon Ward; Adolfo Celi; Diane Cilento; Gabriele Ferzetti
- Cinematography: Ennio Guarnieri
- Edited by: Kevin Connor
- Music by: Mischa Spoliansky
- Production companies: Tomorrow Entertainment; West Film
- Distributed by: Metro-Goldwyn-Mayer (through MGM-EMI in the United Kingdom); Paramount Pictures (North America)
- Release dates: 20 April 1973 (West Germany); 2 May 1973 (UK); 9 May 1973 (US); 31 August 1973 (Italy)
- Running time: 105 minutes
- Countries: United Kingdom; Italy
- Language: English
- Box office: $2,250,000 (US/Canada rentals)

Hitler: The Last Ten Days is a 1973 biographical drama film depicting the days leading up to Adolf Hitler's suicide. The film stars Alec Guinness and Simon Ward, and features an introduction presented by Alistair Cooke; the original music score was composed by Mischa Spoliansky. The film is based on the book Hitler's Last Days: An Eye-Witness Account (first translated in English in 1973) by Gerhard Boldt, an officer in the German Army who survived the Führerbunker.

== Plot ==
The film is told primarily from the viewpoint of the fictional Hauptmann Hoffmann, an officer in the SS who is assigned to duty in the Führerbunker for what will prove the final days in the life of Adolf Hitler, as the Battle of Berlin rapidly moves towards the final defeat of the crumbling Nazi regime. Hoffmann observes a meeting of Hitler and his chief military staff, where the dire warnings by Field Marshal Wilhelm Keitel and General Hans Krebs of Berlin's imminent encirclement are ignored by Hitler, who orders an assault under the command of Felix Steiner in the belief that it will repel the Red Army. While he is pleased with the opportunity to be working so close to his country's leader, and Hitler himself identifies the young Hauptmann as someone with potential, Hoffmann quickly notices how despondent the senior military staff privately are about the situation, even as they celebrate Hitler's 56th birthday. Nonetheless, he resolves to join a number of other officers and officials, including Hitler's partner Eva Braun, along with Joseph Goebbels and his wife Magda, who make a pact to stay in the bunker until the end and kill themselves should Berlin fall to the Red Army. All the while, Hitler refuses to acknowledge the dire reality of the situation, and makes plans to ethnically cleanse the British Isles and Soviet Union following a future Nazi conquest.

Hitler's view of the situation finally comes crashing down on the afternoon of 22 April, when he irately demands to know why he has not received any update on Steiner's attack, and is reluctantly informed by General Alfred Jodl that Steiner did not proceed with the attack, having only one-tenth the number of forces necessary to have any hope of success, and that the fall of Berlin and total defeat of the Nazi regime is now virtually assured. Hitler furiously accuses the assembled military staff of treachery and incompetence, before dejectedly affirming his intention to kill himself before he can be captured by the Soviets. Afterwards, the senior military staff are left paralysed by indecision out of fear of reprisal from Hitler if they try acting without instructions from him, hastening the deterioration of the situation. However, Hitler is brought out of his depression when he reads a horoscope from 1941 describing the end of World War II and takes it to mean that he will turn the situation around and defeat the Allies (unaware that the horoscope is actually describing his own defeat). He is further encouraged by hearsay that an American and Soviet unit fell out and began attacking each other, and orders a renewed assault on the Red Army by General Walther Wenck.

Hermann Göring, apparently acting on now-outdated information about Hitler having given up and intending to kill himself, sends a telegram asking for permission to take control of the government, which Hitler construes as a coup attempt, leading to him ordering Göring arrested. He summons Robert Ritter von Greim to replace Göring as head of the Luftwaffe, and while von Greim is initially very skeptical about having any chance of success in this role, he is won over by Hitler's confidence that the German military will turn the situation around and defeat the Allies, causing Hoffmann to slowly realize that the generals were right about their appraisal of the situation, and that he himself was taken in by Hitler. As time progresses it becomes increasingly apparent that Wenck's attack on the Red Army has failed, and then Hitler is driven further into despondency by news that Heinrich Himmler has attempted to negotiate an end to hostilities. Hitler marries Eva and begins to make preparations to commit suicide.

After dictating his last will and testament, Hitler releases Hoffmann from his suicide pact and entrusts him with a copy of the will; once he leaves the bunker, however, Hoffmann destroys his copy out of disgust at having let himself follow the Nazi ideology. In his final conversation with his generals, Hitler orders them to enact a scorched earth policy on what remains of Berlin to leave it useless for the Soviets, though their reaction makes it clear that they do not intend to carry this out. Hitler then retreats to his bedroom and prepares to end his life, but before he does so he angrily berates Eva, telling her that he never felt anything for her and only entered into a relationship with her to appear more socially acceptable. She kills herself with a sodium cyanide capsule while his back is turned, and he reacts furiously, having intended to kill her himself and seeing this as one final betrayal. Moments later, a gunshot rings out around the bunker as Hitler commits suicide, and the assembled staff immediately begin lighting and smoking cigarettes, in defiance of their now-deceased leader's ban on smoking.

== Cast ==
- Alec Guinness as Adolf Hitler
- Simon Ward as Hauptmann Hoffmann
- Adolfo Celi as General Hans Krebs
- Diane Cilento as Hanna Reitsch
- Gabriele Ferzetti as Field Marshal and Wehrmacht OKW Chief Wilhelm Keitel
- Eric Porter as Luftwaffe General von Greim
- Doris Kunstmann as Eva Braun
- Joss Ackland as General Wilhelm Burgdorf
- John Bennett as Joseph Goebbels
- John Barron as Dr. Stumpfegger
- Barbara Jefford as Magda Goebbels
- Valerie Gray as Helga Goebbels
- Ann Lynn as Traudl Junge
- Sheila Gish as Frau Christian
- Julian Glover as SS-Gruppenführer (General) Hermann Fegelein
- Michael Goodliffe as General Helmut Weidling
- Mark Kingston as Martin Bormann
- Timothy West as Professor und SS-Gruppenfuhrer (General) Karl Gebhardt
- Andrew Sachs as Walter Wagner
- Philip Stone as General Alfred Jodl
- Angela Pleasence as Traudel

== Production ==
Location shooting for the film included the De Laurentiis Studios in Rome and parts of England.

== Release ==
The film opened in 26 theatres in West Germany on the anniversary of Hitler's birth on 20 April 1973, which led to several groups objecting to the film. Initially, the movie was a moderate success at the box office.

Bernard Delfont wrote in his memoirs that he saw the film at a charity screening and felt it was too sympathetic to Hitler. Although his cinema chain was to distribute it he cancelled the movie.

In its first nine days at the Empire, Leicester Square in London, the film grossed £17,860 ($41,971).

== Critical reception ==
Vincent Canby of The New York Times wrote that the film was "about as exciting as a high-minded, parent-approved comic book about the adventures of James Watt and his steam engine":

The film doesn't seem to have been directed, or acted, as much as cast, in the waxworks sense. Actors play individual characters not because they are actors but because they resemble the people in life. Sometimes, however, they look very wrong. Adolfo Celi looks awfully Italian as General Krebs. Guinness looks right as Hitler, and that's about all — but then Hitler may be an impossible role. Almost anything even a good actor does with such a role risks prompting a certain amount of unintended hilarity. (There are times when Guinness's Hitler reminded me most of Jack Benny.)

== Home media ==
The film was released on DVD on 3 June 2008, and was released on Blu-ray in September 2015.

== See also ==
- The Last Ten Days (1955), a film
- The Death of Adolf Hitler (Sunday Night Theatre episode) (1973), a British television film
- The Bunker (1981), a CBS television film
- Downfall (2004), a film
