= Rudolf Weiss =

German military officer (1910–1958)

Rudolf Weiß
- Born: 27 September 1910
- Died: 19 September 1958 (aged 47); Ahmadovsk, Kazakh SSR, Soviet Union
- Military career
- Allegiance: Weimar Republic (1931-1933); Nazi Germany (1933-1945)
- Branch: Army
- Service years: 1931-1945
- Rank: Oberstleutnant
- Conflicts: World War II

Rudolf Weiß (27 September 1910 – 19 September 1958) was a German officer appointed personal adjutant for the Army's Personnel Department Chief (Wilhelm Burgdorf), a position he held until the end of World War II. Further, he was stationed in the Führerbunker in April 1945.

== Biography ==
=== Military career ===
Weiß joined the Reichswehr in 1931, and was commissioned as a lieutenant in 1934. In November 1938, he was assigned to the Army High Command's personnel department, and promoted to captain during 1940. In 1941, he was transferred to the 1st Panzer Division as an adjutant. From April 1942, he served in the General Army Office (Allgemeines Heeresamt) as a motorization officer and by June was promoted to the rank of major. On 2 October, he was appointed the personal adjutant for the Army's Personnel Department chief, a position he held until the end of the Second World War. As such, he served under General Rudolf Schmundt. On 1 April 1944, Weiß was promoted to lieutenant-colonel. On 20 July 1944, Schmundt was severely wounded in the attempt on Adolf Hitler's life, and was replaced by his deputy, Wilhelm Burgdorf. Burgdorf officially became the department's chief after his predecessor's death on 1 October.

=== Berlin 1945 ===
During the Battle of Berlin, Weiß was present in the Führerbunker. On 29 April 1945, Major Bernd Freytag von Loringhoven and Rittmeister Gerhard Boldt requested General Hans Krebs' permission to join the fighting outside. Krebs consulted with Burgdorf, who answered that they should take Weiß with them. At around 1330 hours, Hitler approved the action and ordered the men to break through to General Wenck's 12th Army. Hitler further told them: "Send my regards for Walther Wenck. He should make haste, before it is too late."

Weiß became separated from his two companions and was captured by Red Army troops. He subsequently spent five years in a prisoner-of-war camp in Poland. He died in 1958.

== Bibliography ==
- Beevor, Antony (2002). Berlin: The Downfall 1945. London: Viking-Penguin Books. ISBN 978-0-670-03041-5.
- Heiber, Helmut and Glantz, David M. (2002). Hitler and his Generals: Military Conferences 1942-1945: The First Complete Stenographic Record of the Military Situation Conferences, from Stalingrad to Berlin. ISBN 978-1-929631-09-4.
- Joachimsthaler, Anton (1995). Hitlers Ende: Legenden und Dokumente. ISBN 978-3-7766-2383-3
- Joachimsthaler, Anton (1999) [1995]. The Last Days of Hitler: The Legends, the Evidence, the Truth. Trans. Helmut Bögler. London: Brockhampton Press. ISBN 978-1-86019-902-8.
- Knopp, Guido (1995). Das Ende 1945: der Verdammte Krieg. ISBN 978-3-570-12153-5
- von Loringhoven, Bernd Freytag (2006). In the Bunker with Hitler: The Last Witness Speaks. ISBN 0-297-84555-1.
