= Armin D. Lehmann =

German activist

Armin Dieter Lehmann
- Born: 23 May 1928; Munich, Bavaria, Germany
- Died: 10 October 2008 (aged 80); Coos Bay, Oregon, U.S.
- Known for: Last courier of Adolf Hitler, peace activism
- SS career
- Allegiance: Germany
- Branch: Waffen-SS
- Conflicts: World War II

Armin Dieter Lehmann (23 May 1928 – 10 October 2008) was a Hitler Youth courier in the Führerbunker towards the end of Adolf Hitler's life, leaving shortly after Hitler committed suicide. He spent his post-war life in travel, tourism, and writing as a peace activist.

== Early life ==
Lehmann was born in 1928 in Waldtrudering, a borough of Munich. Lehmann received his education at Elisabet Gymnasium in Breslau during World War II, and The Journalism School in Munich after the war.

== Life in the United States ==
Lehmann emigrated to the United States in 1953. From 1955 to 1957, Lehmann taught at the United States Armed Forces Institute, and also served as transportation coordinator at Tachikawa AFB in Japan.

For over 40 years, Lehmann worked in the travel and tourism industry as a tour director and operator, as well as a travel industry training specialist and consultant. He lectured extensively as an associate professor in Travel & Tourism for the Airline & Travel Academy, TWA's Breech Academy, and Pacific States University in Los Angeles, California.

Lehmann was the author of ten books, including Travel and Tourism, An Introduction To Travel Agency Operations, and Travel Agency Policy & Procedures Manual. In addition, he wrote more than 200 articles for travel industry trade journals. From 1977-81, Lehmann served as Vice President of Education & Training for the Association of Retail Travel Agents.

In 1969, he was honored with the "Community Leader of America Award." In 1993, Lehmann retired as a travel management consultant and retail travel agency owner. He then spent his time researching, along with developing his memoirs.

Books about his childhood experiences in the Hitler Youth include Hitler's Last Courier and In Hitler’s Bunker, which has been translated into seven languages. He also produced a documentary film about his experiences as one of Hitler's "boy soldiers", entitled Eyewitness to History.

== Peace activism ==
At the end of World War II, when he was 17, Lehmann decided to devote his life to peace activism. As a peace advocate, Lehmann participated in Professor Linus Pauling's "Campaign For Nuclear Weapons Disarmament."

In the cause of peace, Lehmann traveled to more than 150 countries, speaking out for non-violence, tolerance, and understanding with such other voices as Jawaharlal Nehru and Albert Schweitzer to all who would listen.

== Death ==
Lehmann died in Coos Bay, Oregon, on 10 October 2008. His wife of 29 years, Kim, and daughter, Angie, were at his bedside. The location of his burial was not released to the general public.

== See also ==
- Bernd von Freytag-Loringhoven
- Rochus Misch

== Bibliography ==
- Boulé, Margie "From Hitler's bunker to Coos Bay" Oregonian, October 21, 2008.
- Joachimsthaler, Anton. The Last Days of Hitler. London: Cassell, 2002.
- Knauer, Kelly (ed.). V-E Day. Time: New York, 2005.
- Lehmann, Armin D. Hitler’s Last Courier. Xlibris Corporation, 2000. OCLC 46606344
- Lehmann, Armin D. and Carroll, Tim. In Hitler’s Bunker. Guilford: The Lyons Press, 2004. OCLC 57069258
- Lehmann, Armin. Tomorrow’s World: A Book of Peace. Free e-bookOCLC 9936795
- Lehmann, Armin D. Resume, 2007.
- Lester, Gary. Eyewitness To History (DVD). Port Orange: Blue Heron International Pictures LLC, 2007. http://blueheronpix.com/armin_lehmann_for_peace
- North, Oliver. War Stories III. Washington: Regnery Publishing, 2001.
