= Bruno von Freytag-Löringhoff =

German philosopher

Bruno Baron von Freytag-Löringhoff
- Image of Bruno von Freytag-Löringhoff in contemplation.
- Born: 11 June 1912; Bilderlingshof, Riga
- Died: 28 February 1996 (aged 83); Tübingen, Germany
- Citizenship: German
- Education: University of Greifswald; Ludwig-Maximilians-Universität München; University of Tübingen
- Scientific career
- Fields: philosophy Mathematics; Epistemology
- Workplaces: University of Tübingen

Bruno Baron von Freytag-Löringhoff (11 June 1912–28 February 1996) was a German philosopher, mathematician and epistemologist. He was also a university lecturer at the University of Tübingen. During World War II, Freytag-Löringhoff worked as a mathematician in the In 7/VI, which was the signals intelligence agency of the Wehrmacht and worked with Fritz Menzer on the testing of cryptographic devices and procedures. Freytag-Löringhoff worked specifically on the testing of the m-40 cipher machine. His most important contributions to the history of logic and mathematics was his studies and descriptions from 1957, of the calculating machine, built by Wilhelm Schickard.

Bruno von Freytag-Löringhoff was an aristocrat and a member of the noble house of Frydag.

Coat of arms of the Freytag-Löringhoff family

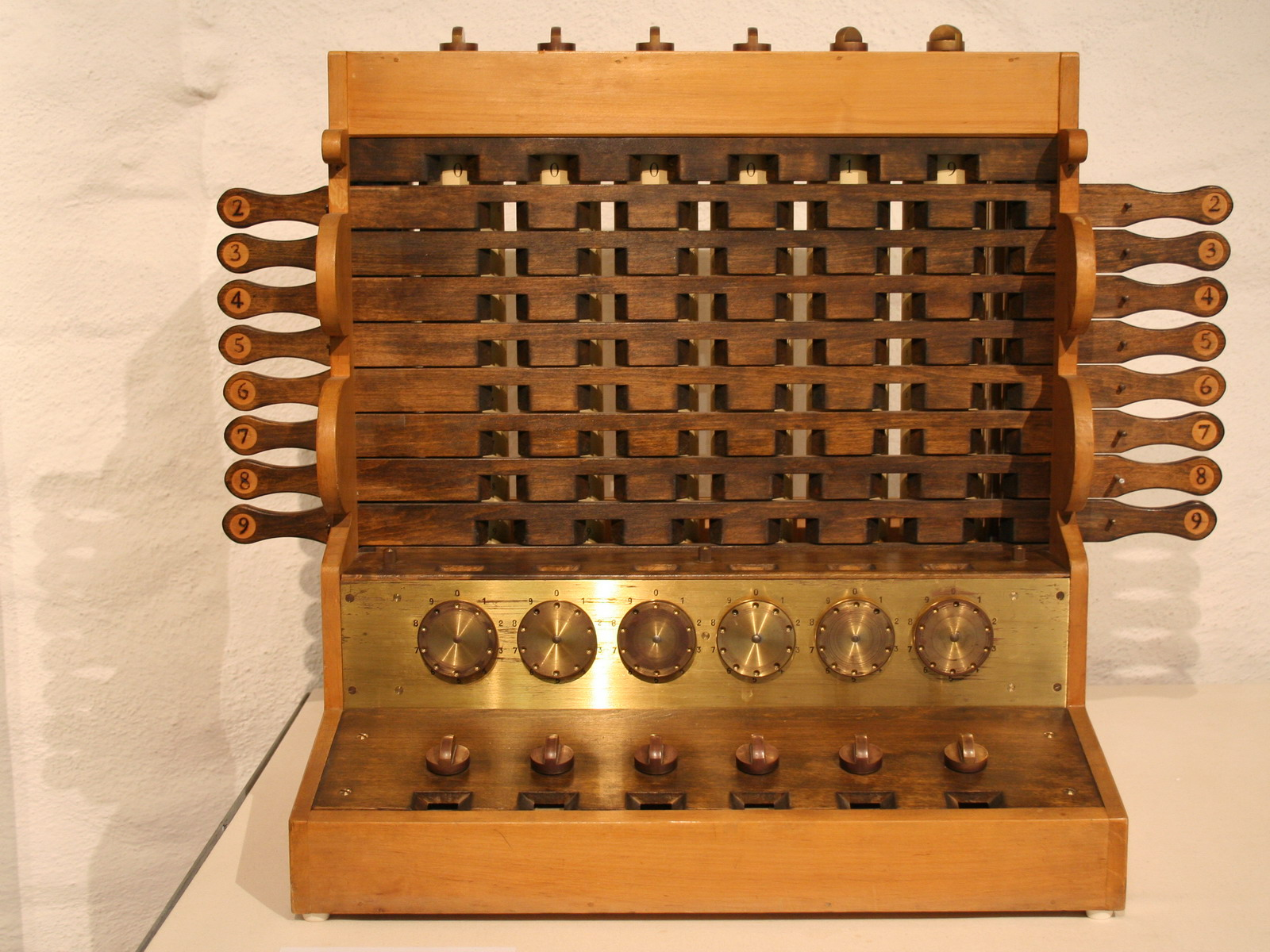
Replica of the computational machine by Wilhelm Schickard, 1623. Freytag-Löringhoff built several of these during his study of Wilhelm Schickard, possibly including this one.

== Life ==
After attending lectures in mathematics, physics, musicology and philosophy at the University of Greifswald and the Ludwig-Maximilians-Universität München, Freytag earned his doctorate in Philosophy in Greifswald in 1936 and habilitated in 1944 in Freiburg im Breisgau and 1947 in Tübingen after taking part in the war. From 1955, Freytag-Löringhoff was Professor of Philosophy at the University of Tübingen. In 1957, he reconstructed the first calculating machine of 1623, which was handed down only in scanty sketches from the Tübingen astronomy professor Wilhelm Schickard. He also built the data sticks from Schickard. After his retirement in 1977, Freytag studied the structures of the still-new PCs.

== Research ==
During the Third German Congress of Philosophy in October 1950, Freytag-Löringhoff presented a series of theses to the Symposium, where he argued that the various logical systems were not pure but that each of them includes a pure kernel that could be identified and separated out. The kernel could be considered pure philosophical logic, i.e. logic tout court which is characterised by its properties, that is, identity, contradiction and their interweaving (German: Verflechtung). Although there were many logical calculi, he considered pure logic to be unique and that diverse logical systems are mathematical systems that must be interpreted with the aid of pure logic. For Freytag-Löringhoff:

mathematics presupposes logic and cannot found it

Logical calculi begin from elements which require analysis through pure logic. He considered the most fundamental element in logistic is judgment (German: Urteil), the most fundamental element in logic is concept, (German: Begriff). Pure philosophical logic is a closed, self-contained system, without fundamental flaws and of great beauty and wide applicability, and attacks against classical logic are largely unjustified. Freytag-Löringhoff was a staunch proponent of Aristotelian logic. His views were challenged by Józef Maria Bocheński, Paul Bernays and Béla Juhos, who were also at the Symposium. Haskell Curry constructed a logical model that he used to contest Freytag-Löringhoff's theses.

His most important contribution to logic was the study, which started in 1979, of the calculating machine of Wilhelm Schickard. During his lifetime, he constructed several models, one of which he kept at his home with the help of mechanic, Erwin Epple.

== Bibliography ==
- The ontological foundations of mathematics. A study on the Mathematical Existence, German: Die ontologischen Grundlagen der Mathematik. Eine Untersuchung über die Mathematische Existenz, Verlag Niemeyer, Halle 1937.
- To the mode of being of mathematical objects, German: Zur Seinsweise der mathematischen Gegenstände, In: German Mathematics, Volume 4, ed. Theodor Vahlen, Ludwig Bieberbach, 1939, pp. 238–240.
- Thoughts on the philosophy of mathematics, German: Gedanken zur Philosophie der Mathematik. Meisenheim. Meisenheim / Glan 1948.
- About system of modes of syllogism. In: Journal of Philosophical Research, German: Über das System der modi des Syllogismus. In: Zeitschrift für philosophische Forschung, Jg. 4 (1949), No. 2, pp. 235–256.
- Theses and discussion on philosophical preliminary questions of logistics in a symposium of the Third German Congress for Philosophy in Bremen 1950. In: Congress report * Symphilosophein, German: Thesen und Diskussion über philosophische Vorfragen der Logistik in einem Symposion des Dritten Deutschen Kongresses für Philosophie in Bremen 1950. In: Kongreßbericht Symphilosophein. Leo Lehnen Verlag, Munich 1952, pp. 161–203. Edited by Arnold Schmidt.
- Probability, causality and freedom. In: Philosophia naturalis, German: Wahrscheinlichkeit, Kausalität und Freiheit. In: Philosophia naturalis. Volume 2, 1952, No. 1, pp. 35–49.
- To logic as a doctrine of identity and diversity. In: Actes du Xlme Congres International de Philosophy Bruxelles, German: Zur Logik als Lehre von Identität und Verschiedenheit. In: Actes du Xléme Congrés international de Philosophie Bruxelles. 1953. Volume 5, Brussels 1953, pp. 19–24.
- About the hypothetical judgment and the inference to its premises. In: Journal of Philosophical Research, German: Über das hypothetische Urteil und den Rückschluß auf seine Prämissen. In: Zeitschrift für philosophische Forschung. Jg. 9 (1955), No. 1, pp. 56–76.
- Logic. Her system and her relationship to logistics, German: Logik. Ihr System und ihr Verhältnis zur Logistik, 3. 3rd, improved, edition, Kohlhammer Verlag, Stuttgart 1955.
- Logic I. The system of pure logic and its relation to logistics, German: Das System der reinen Logik und ihr Verhältnis zur Logistik. Kohlhammer Verlag, Stuttgart 1955; 5th edition, Stuttgart 1972.
- Logic II. Definition Theory and Methodology of Calculus Change, German: Definitionstheorie und Methodologie des Kalkülwechsels. Stuttgart 1967.
- About a mistake Bolzano and the relationship between conceptual and judgment logic. In: Journal of Philosophical Research, German: Über einen Irrtum Bolzanos und das Verhältnis zwischen Begriffs- und Urteilslogik. In: Zeitschrift für Philosophische Forschung. Jg 25 (1971), No. 3, pp. 327–344.
- New system of logic. Symbolic-symmetrical reconstruction and operative application of the Aristotelian approach, published by Felix Meiner, German: Neues System der Logik. Symbolisch-symmetrische Rekonstruktion und operative Anwendung des aristotelischen Ansatzes. Hamburg 1985, ISBN 3-7873-0636-6, as a PDF file
- Wilhelm Schickards Tübinger calculating machine of 1623 (edited by Friedrich Seck), German: Wilhelm Schickards Tübinger Rechenmaschine von 1623. 3rd edition, Cultural Office, Tübingen 2002, ISBN 3-910090-48-6.
