= Walter Wagner (notary) =

German notary

- Born: 25 June 1907; Berlin, Germany
- Died: 29/30 April 1945 (aged 37); Berlin, Germany
- Occupations: Notary, lawyer
- Known for: Marrying Adolf Hitler and Eva Braun

Walter Wagner (25 June 1907 – 29/30 April 1945) was the notary who married Adolf Hitler to Eva Braun in the Führerbunker on 29 April 1945.

== Career ==
Wagner was a lawyer who had joined the Nazi Party on 1 July 1931. In 1938 he was appointed acting head of the Central Legal Department in the Berlin Gau (Administrative Region). This position was formerly confirmed in January 1944 by Reichsminister Joseph Goebbels, acting in his capacity as Gauleiter of Berlin.

Wagner also represented Goebbels and the Berlin Gau in connection with the re-settlement of Berlin residents in Reichsgau Wartheland, a large area of Poland which had been annexed by the invading German armed forces in 1939. Wagner carried out duties in that area from January 1943 to February 1944 and was based in Posen, the capital, where he not only met the local Governor, Arthur Greiser, but his future wife, Cordula Kroepels, an NSV (National Socialist People's Welfare) social worker who was also involved in the re-settlement programme. Following their marriage on 10 March 1944, they moved to an apartment in Berlin-Buch where they lived together until October 1944. Wagner also held a position with the local Pankow council as administrator of their refuse collection services.

In October 1944 Cordula, who was heavily pregnant, left Berlin to live with her mother at Wyk auf Fohr (the second largest of the North Frisian Islands) where their son Michael was born on 1 November.

In October 1944 Wagner joined the "Gauleitung" Battalion of the Berlin component of the Volkssturm (Home Guard). He continued living in his Berlin-Buch apartment together with his sister Gustl who last saw him in April 1945 when he was taken to the Führerbunker.

== Wagner marries Adolf Hitler and Eva Braun ==
In late April, Hitler decided to marry Eva Braun and subsequently directed Goebbels to find a registrar who could carry out the ceremony. On 28 April Goebbels ordered the Waffen SS to locate Wagner (who he knew possessed the required qualifications) and bring him to the Führerbunker. The Waffen SS despatched a unit in an armoured personnel carrier to Wagner's home, only to find that he was fighting in the Friedrichstrasse area. Once located he was taken to the Führerbunker where he realised that the correct paperwork was not available. The armoured unit was then obliged to take him back to Pankow where he found the correct documents. They then returned to the Führerbunker.

Wagner performed the ceremony just after midnight. The event was witnessed by Goebbels and Martin Bormann. Almost immediately afterwards Wagner left the Führerbunker and rejoined his unit.

== Wagner's death ==
Wagner's unit was now charged with the defence of the Potsdamer Platz. The fighting was desperate and chaotic. Wagner's friend, colleague and company commander, Erich Illing, was severely wounded by Russian tank fire. Wagner, the Number 1 Section Commander immediately assumed command of the company. As he continued the fight in the Anhalter Bahnhof area he was shot in the head and killed. It was less than 24 hours since he had married Hitler and Eva Braun. His body was never found.

== Post World War II ==
In 1951 Wagner's widow, Cordula, who had moved to Hamburg with the son he had never seen, wished to remarry. She petitioned the Hamburg Court to issue a death certificate and, after submitting a number of affidavits from individuals who had been present at the time of Wagner's death, it was finally granted.

In 1963 Stern magazine reported to the Hamburg Court that there were rumours circulating in Frankfurt that Wagner was living there. The court reopened the case. Gustl was questioned by a judge in Wyk and Cordula was interviewed in Mannheim. The case was subsequently closed.

== The Last Card ==
Although he was portrayed in many post war films, the real Walter Wagner remained a faceless individual until 2004 when the first photograph of him was published in Hitler and Women – The Love Life of Adolf Hitler.

In 1980, investigative writer Ian Sayer purchased a postcard, handwritten by Walter Wagner on 30 March 1945. It was addressed to his wife on the Frisian island of Fohr where she was living with his, as yet, unseen son. The stamp was a typical Nazi stamp bearing Hitler's effigy. Someone had written at the top in another hand "The Last Card".

Wagner's handwriting was so indecipherable that it took Sayer 22 years to obtain a full translation. During the intervening period Sayer had attempted to locate any surviving members of Wagner's family. In 2002 he located Wagner's son, which prompted the publication of Hitler and Women which contained the first photograph of Wagner to be published. During his investigation Sayer had learned that Wagner's wife had been interrogated by British Intelligence at the end of the war to establish if she had heard from Wagner who had disappeared in Berlin. He was wanted for questioning in connection with the marriage of Hitler and Eva Braun. The British Intelligence officer had retained the card and sold it at auction 35 years later.

== Portrayal in the media ==
The scene of Hitler's wedding is depicted in the films Hitler: The Last Ten Days, The Bunker and Der Untergang (Downfall), all of which correctly portray Wagner, in accordance with Nazi law, asking Hitler and Braun to confirm that they were of pure "Aryan" descent before the marriage can proceed. Walter Wagner has been portrayed by the following actors in film and television productions:

- Georg-Michael Wagner in the 1971 Eastern Bloc co-production Liberation: The Last Assault
- Andrew Sachs in the 1973 British film Hitler: The Last Ten Days
- John Ringham in the 1973 British television production The Death of Adolf Hitler
- Robert Austin in the 1981 United States television production The Bunker
- Norbert Heckner in the 2004 German film Downfall (Der Untergang)
- Unknown actor in the BBC documentary series Rise of the Nazis in season 3 episode 3 Into the Abyss September 2023
