= Axel von Freytagh-Loringhoven =

German law professor and politician

Professor of Law, University of Breslau (today, the University of Wrocław)
- In office 1918 – 28 October 1942

Member of the Court Permanent Court of Arbitration
- In office 13 April 1934 – 28 October 1942

Additional positions
- 1933–1942: Member of the Prussian State Council
- 1924–1942: Member of the Reichstag
- 1921–1926: Member of the Prussian State Council
- 1921–1925: Member of the Provincial Landtag of Lower Silesia

Personal details
- Born: 1 December 1878 Arensburg (today, Kuressaare), Governorate of Estonia, Russian Empire
- Died: 28 October 1942 (age 63) Breslau, Province of Lower Silesia, Free State of Prussia, Nazi Germany
- Party: German National People's Party
- Other political affiliations: Deutschvölkischer Schutz- und Trutzbund
- Education: University of Dorpat
- Profession: Professor of Law

Military service
- Allegiance: Russian Empire
- Branch/service: Imperial Russian Army
- Years of service: 1901–1902
- Rank: Lieutenant
- Unit: 13th Vladimir Dragoon Regiment

Axel August Gustav Johann Freiherr von Freytagh-Loringhoven (1 December 1878 – 28 October 1942) was a Baltic German who became a professor of constitutional and international law and emigrated from Russia to Germany in 1917. He was a Völkisch-minded, antisemitic, nationalist and monarchist. A founding member of the German National People's Party and an opponent of the Weimar Republic, he supported Adolf Hitler becoming Chancellor of Germany in 1933. He served as a Reichstag deputy from 1924 to 1942 and was a member of the Prussian State Council. He was also Germany's representative on the Permanent Court of Arbitration at The Hague.

== Life in Russia through the First World War ==
Freytagh-Loringhoven came from a Baltic German noble family. He was born in Arensburg (today, Kuressaare) in what was then the Russian Governorate of Estonia. He attended the Gymnasium in Arensburg and Riga. He then studied law from 1897 to 1901 at the University of Dorpat (today, the University of Tartu), where he was a member of the German-speaking student association Baltische Corporation Livonia Dorpat. From 1901 to 1902, he performed military service as a one-year volunteer with the Imperial Russian 13th Vladimir Dragoon Regiment as a lieutenant of reserves. He later took part in the Russian Revolution of 1905 with the Baltic Defense Force. After receiving a Doctor of Law degree in 1908, he became a lecturer at Saint Petersburg State University, also writing political articles as the editor of a German-language newspaper, the Sankt Petersburger Zeitung. In 1910 he became an associate professor of international law at Yaroslavl State University. In 1911 he received a full professorship at the University of Dorpat, however, during the First World War, he had to flee Russia and emigrated to Germany. Because of his knowledge of Russia and the Russian language, in 1917 he became a legal advisor to the Oberbefehlshaber Ost, the Supreme Commander of German Forces in the East. He was also appointed as a judge at the high court in Kaunas.

== Career in the Weimar Republic ==
In 1918, Freytagh-Loringhoven received an appointment as professor of law at the University of Breslau (today, the University of Wrocław), teaching constitutional, administrative and international law there until his death. He was not a supporter of the German Revolution of 1918–1919. He was opposed to the democratic system of government that was instituted and remained a committed monarchist. In 1919, he became a member of the board of the local Deutschvölkischer Schutz- und Trutzbund, the largest and most influential antisemitic organization in Germany. He was also a member of the monarchist Bund der Aufrechten (League of the Upright), which was also antisemitic. Both organizations were banned after right-wing extremists murdered Walther Rathenau, the German Foreign Minister who was Jewish. Freytagh-Loringhoven rejected the Weimar Constitution because, among other factors, its chief author, Hugo Preuß, was Jewish. He blamed the Social Democrats (SPD), the Communists and the Jews for Germany's defeat in the First World War that he believed resulted from the revolution, the so-called stab-in-the-back myth. Since most of the parties in the Weimar Coalition, such as the SPD, the German Center Party and the German Democratic Party had supported the signing of the Versailles Treaty, he held them responsible for its adverse provisions, including reparations and the war guilt clause.

Freytagh-Loringhoven was a bitter enemy of the Weimar Republic and expressed anti-republican views in his books and newspaper articles, including the legal opinion that its constitution was illegitimate because of its revolutionary origins, and that Prince Max von Baden, Friedrich Ebert and Philipp Scheidemann were traitors. He also advocated these theories in his lectures and was able to fend off disciplinary proceedings that were initiated against him by citing parliamentary immunity after he was elected as a parliamentary deputy in 1924.

As one of the co-founders of the anti-republican German National People's Party (DNVP) in 1919, Freytagh-Loringhoven served on its executive committee from 1922 to its dissolution in 1933. From 1921 to 1925, he was a member of the Provincial Landtag of the Province of Lower Silesia, which elected him as a deputy member of the Prussian State Council from May 1921 to February 1926. From 1924 until his death, he was a deputy of the Reichstag from electoral constituency 7 (Breslau) and served on the Foreign Affairs Committee. He fought against Foreign Minister Gustav Stresemann's policy of rapprochement with the wartime Allies, and opposed both the acceptance of Germany into the League of Nations and the Locarno Treaties. His attack on Stresemann in a Reichstag debate in January 1928 was particularly notable, as the DNVP had earlier joined the government coalition and Stresemann had insisted that it explicitly pledge support for his diplomatic efforts; Freytagh-Loringhoven's speech constituted a breach of that pledge and within six months the coalition fell apart.

== Career in Nazi Germany ==
Along with DNVP Chairman Alfred Hugenberg, Freytagh-Loringhoven supported the appointment of Adolf Hitler as Reich Chancellor in January 1933 as the head of a Nazi–DNVP coalition government, and was himself even considered as a candidate for a ministerial post. However, as the Nazis moved quickly to consolide their power and eliminate all rival parties, Freytagh-Loringhoven entered into negotiations with them over terms of the dissolution of the DNVP, which took place at the end of June 1933. He remained a member of the Nazi-dominated Reichstag from that point on as a nonpartisan "guest" of the Nazis, though the 1938 Reichstag handbook listed him as a Nazi Party deputy. The Prussian Minister president Hermann Göring appointed him to the recently reconstituted Prussian State Council on 23 July 1933. He also became a founding member of Hans Frank's Academy for German Law on 3 October 1933 and was chairman of its Committee for Colonial Law. Also in 1933, he became chairman of the Cultural Council of the Deutsches Ausland-Institut (German Foreign Institute) in Stuttgart as well as a member of its Science Council. On 13 April 1934, he was appointed as Germany's representative on the Permanent Court of Arbitration at The Hague. On his 60th birthday in December 1938, Hitler awarded him the Goethe Medal for Art and Science. Freytagh-Loringhoven died in Breslau on 28 October 1942.

== Writings ==
An author of many books, the content of Freytagh-Loringhoven's Germany's Foreign Policy 1933–1941 (1942) makes it clear that he fully supported the foreign conquest policy of the Hitler regime, and had become "the official interpreter of National Socialist foreign policy". He was also the editor of the European Revue, which was financed by the Reich Propaganda Ministry. After the end of the Second World War, writings by Freytagh-Loringhoven were placed on the list of proscribed literature in the Soviet Occupation Zone and, later, in the German Democratic Republic.

== Selected works ==
The following are some of Freytagh-Loringhoven's most notable books.

- The History of the Russian Revolution. J. F. Lehmann, München 1919.
- The Weimar Constitution in Doctrine and Reality. J. F. Lehmann, Munich 1924.
- Germany and the League of Nations. J. F. Lehmann, Munich 1925.
- From Locarno to Geneva and Thoiry. Brunnen-Verlag K. Winckler, Berlin 1926.
- The Statutes of the League of Nations. With introduction and explanations by Freiherr von Freytagh-Loringhoven. G. Stilke, Berlin 1926.
- Germany's Foreign Policy 1933–1939. Otto Karl Stollberg, Berlin 1939; 6th edition 1940; 9th edition 1942; 11th edition 1943.

== Sources ==
- Axel von Freytagh-Loringhoven entry in the Baltic Biographical Digital Lexicon
- Axel von Freytagh-Loringhoven entry in the Deutsche Biographie
- Axel von Freytagh-Loringhoven obituary in Der Ost-Express, 2 November 1942
- Beck, Hermann (2009). The Fateful Alliance: German Conservatives and Nazis in 1933: The Machtergreifung In A New Light. Oxford: Berghahn Books. ISBN 978-1-84545-496-8.
- Information about Axel von Freytagh-Loringhoven in the Reichstag database
- Klee, Ernst (2007). Das Personenlexikon zum Dritten Reich. Wer war was vor und nach 1945. Frankfurt-am-Main: Fischer-Taschenbuch-Verlag. ISBN 978-3-596-16048-8.
- Lilla, Joachim (2005). Der Preußische Staatsrat 1921–1933: Ein biographisches Handbuch. Düsseldorf: Droste Verlag. ISBN 978-3-770-05271-4.
- Rathbun, Brian C. (2014). Diplomacy's Value: Creating Security in 1920s Europe and the Contemporary Middle East. Cornell University Press. ISBN 978-0-801-47990-8.
- Stolleis, Michael (2002). History of public law in Germany - Weimar Republic and National Socialism. Munich: C.H. Beck. ISBN 978-3-406-48960-0.
