= Freitag Homestead =

- U.S. National Register of Historic Places
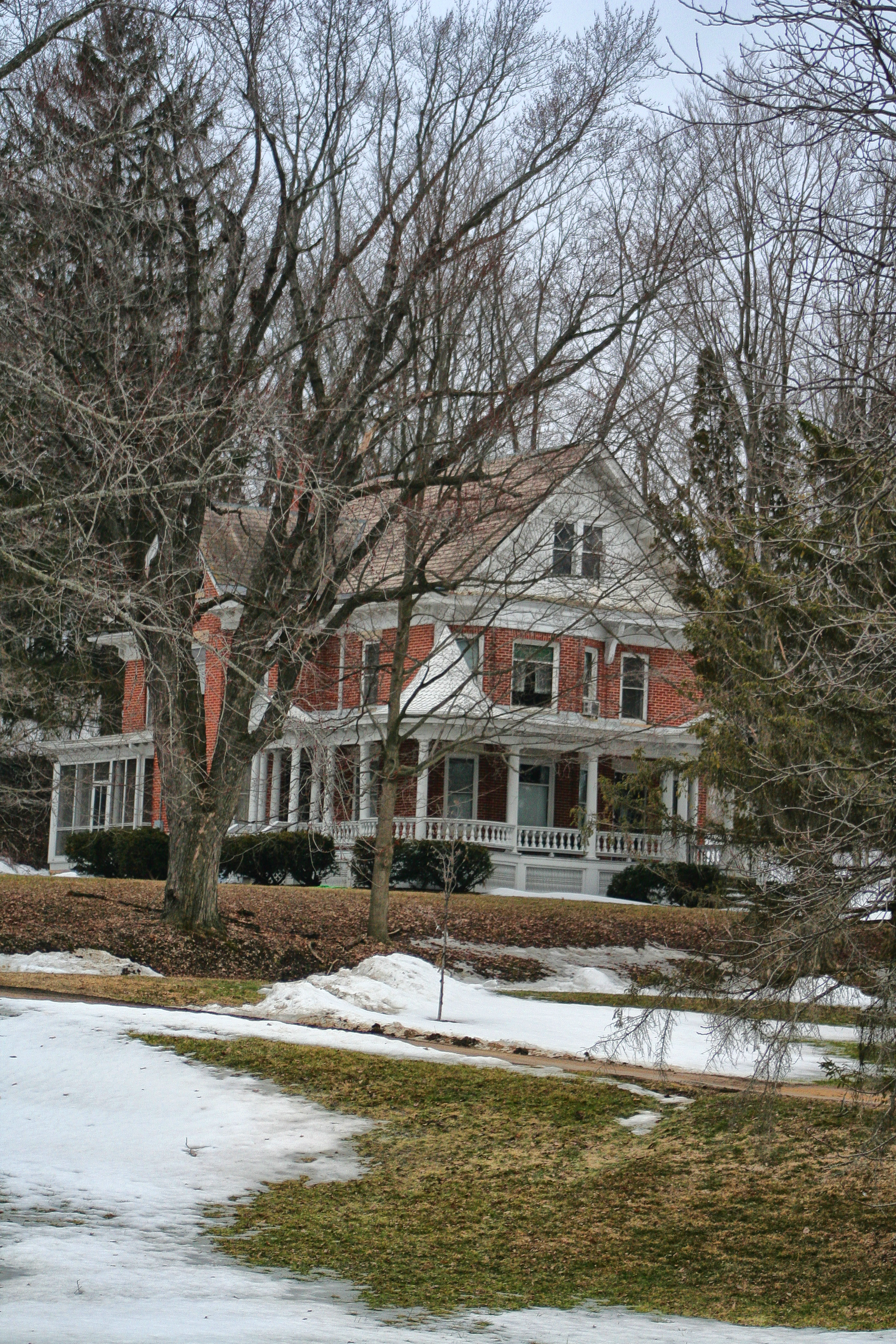
- Location: Washington, Green County, Wisconsin
- NRHP reference No.: 05001302
- Added to NRHP: November 15, 2005

The Freitag Homestead is a historic farm begun in 1848 in the town of Washington, Green County, Wisconsin. It is also the site of the first Swiss cheese factory in Wisconsin. The farm was added to the National Register of Historic Places in 2005.

Fridolin Streiff bought the homestead's land and started the farm in 1848. He had come to the U.S. in 1845 as one of two scouts for a site for a colony of emigrants from the canton of Glarus in Switzerland. He and the other scout founded New Glarus, but the other man returned to Switzerland, and for several years Streiff led the colony of impoverished Swiss settlers. When they were somewhat established, Frietag bought this land and began to build his farm with his wife Katharina. In their first years they built a log house and other farm buildings which do not survive. In those early years, farmers in Green County made most of their money growing wheat.

By 1862 the Streiffs were prosperous enough to build a nicer house for themselves. It is the oldest surviving building on the farm, but is not the house pictured at right. Their 1862 farmhouse is in gabled ell form with the then-popular Greek Revival-styled cornice returns, and with bay windows and lunette windows in the gables.

In 1869 the Streiffs sold the farm to Dietrich and Verena Freitag - also immigrants from Glarus, Switzerland. That same year, Nikolaus Gerber began to make Swiss-style cheese in the Streiff's old log house. This was around the time that chinch bugs and other factors were pushing farmers from growing wheat to other lines of business. Milk for the factory was supplied by the Freitag's herd and four other local farms. This was the first Swiss cheese factory in Wisconsin, operating in the cabin until 1877. Dietrich and the farmers took the factory over from Gerber in 1875 and operated it on the farm in various configurations until 1900. Swiss cheese manufacture became important to Green County's economy and remained so for decades; in 1938 the county produced a quarter of the Swiss cheese made in the U.S. Today some of Gerber's equipment is on display in the Swiss Historical Village in New Glarus.

In 1895, Dietrich's sons Nicholas and Henry bought the farm, and Nicholas bought out Henry's share shortly after Dietrich died in 1900. Nicholas ran the farm for the rest of his life, and was also a director of the Bank of Monticello and was active in the Reformed Church in Monticello.

Other surviving historic buildings on the farm include:

- The hog barn built around 1880 by Deitrich Freitag is a gable-roofed bank barn, wood frame on a fieldstone foundation. The hog pens were originally in the basement. A corn crib is built into each end of the building and a stone loading ramp leads to the center door. A ventilator sits atop the center of the gable roof - rather elegant compared with the rest of the building.
- The dairy barn was also built around 1880. It too is a gable-roofed bank barn. Deitrich's original section is 90 by 40 feet, with the first-story walls of thick fieldstone. Above is the hay loft, with tall openings on the side filled with louvers for ventilation. On top of the ridge are two square ventilators. A milk house was added in the 1950s and other structures over the years.
- In 1906 Nicholas and Elsbeth Freitag built a new house (pictured) in the then popular Queen Anne style. It has a limestone foundation and red brick walls, with eaves supported by ornamental brackets, leading to a gable and hip roof. A one-story veranda wraps the front of the house, with a turret at one corner. Inside, the house has hardwood floors and plaster walls with varnished woodwork. Especially notable are some parquet floors and a wooden grillwork. The house has no fireplaces, as it was heated by radiators from the start. With many of the original finishes and furnishings intact, the Freitag house is one of the finest Queen Annes in Green County.

The Freitag family still owns the homestead. They don't live there, but many return each year for a get-together on the July 4th weekend
