= Maria Freytag =

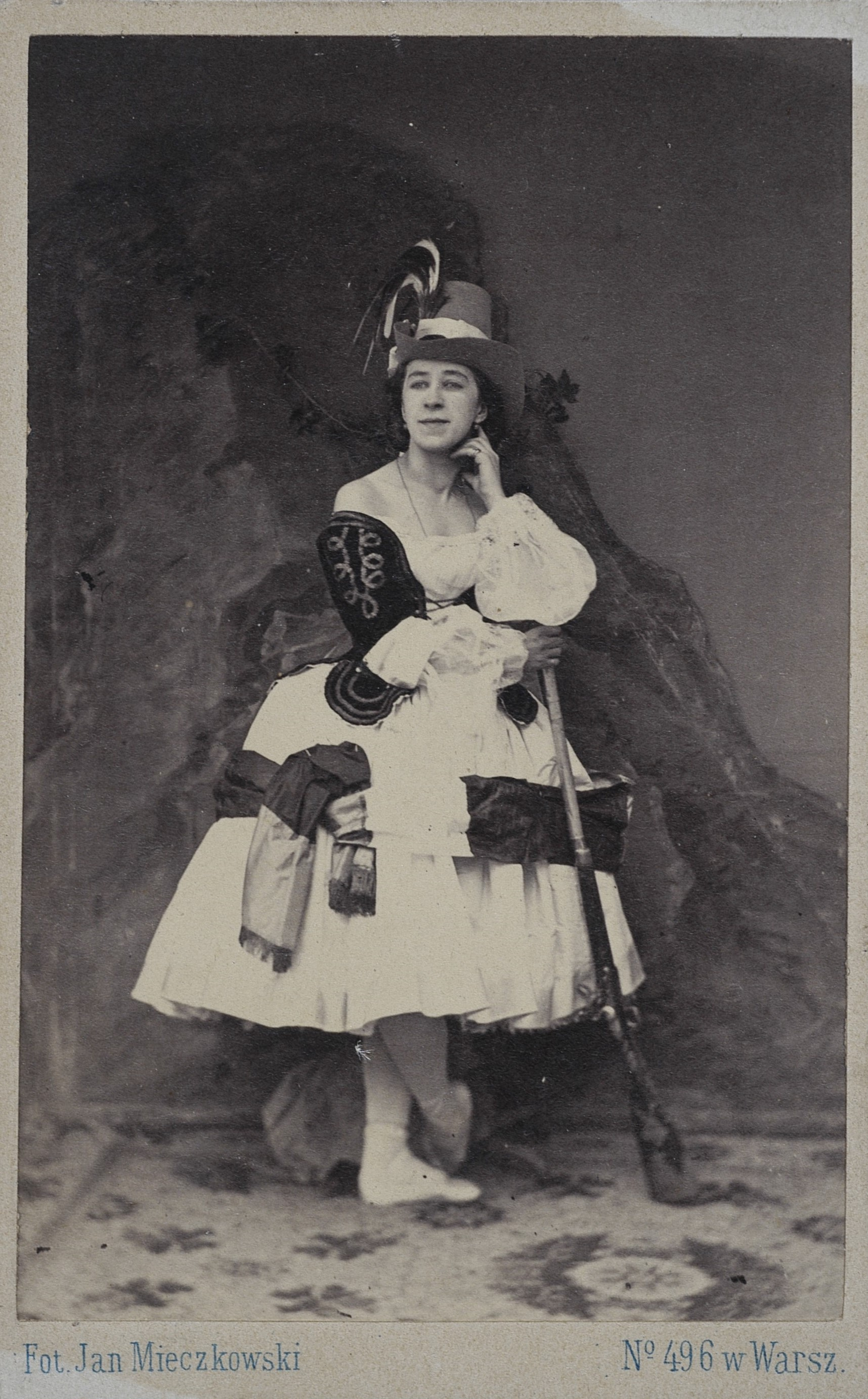
Freytag as Catarina in the ballet, Catarina or La Fille du Bandit, 1856

Maria Freytag (1835 – 1873) was a Polish ballet dancer. She belonged to the more well known ballet dancers in Poland during her career.

She was engaged in the Ballet at the National Theatre, Warsaw between 1844 and 1863.

== Sources ==
- Źródło: Słownik Biograficzny Teatru Polskiego 1765–1965, PWN Warszawa 1973
