= Grothaus =

Grothaus, Grothus, or Grotthuss is a surname. Notable people with the surname include:

- Eleonore von Grothaus (1734–1794), German noblewoman, writer, poet, lay musician, educator
- Gisela Grothaus (born in Berlin), West German slalom canoeist
- Michael Grothaus (born 1977), American novelist and journalist
- Edward Bernard Grothus (1923-2009), American anti-nuclear activist
- Theodor Grotthuss (1785-1822), German chemist
