= Hugo von Freytag-Loringhoven =

German historian and general (1855–1924)

Hugo Friedrich Philipp Johann Freiherr von Freytag-Loringhoven
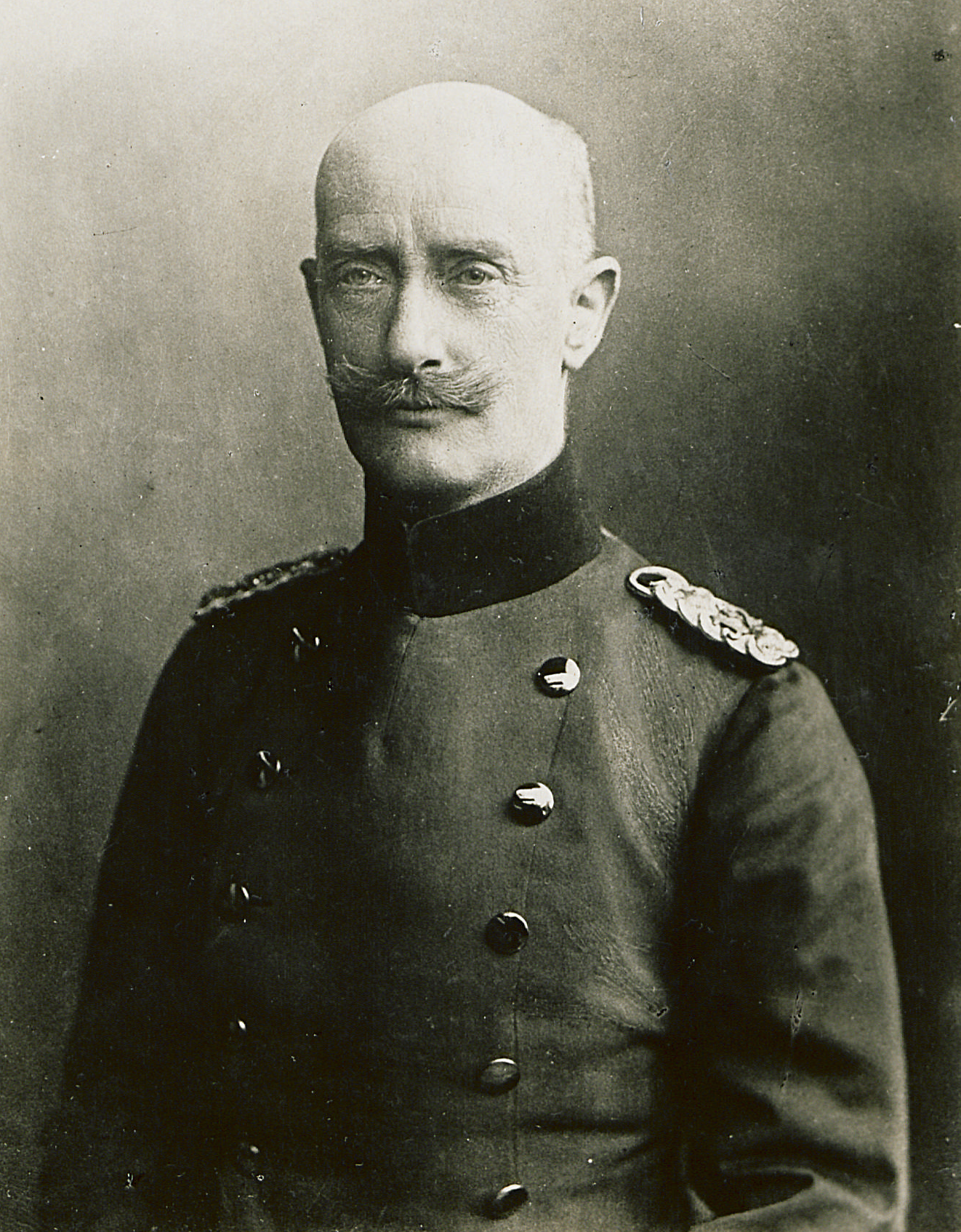
- Hugo von Freytag-Loringhoven (1916)
- Born: May 20, 1855; Copenhagen, Denmark
- Died: October 19, 1924 (aged 69) Weimar
- Allegiance: Prussia
- Branch: Imperial German Army
- Service years: 1877–1924
- Rank: General of the Infantry (1918)
- Awards: Pour le Mérite (1916)
- Children: Baron Leopold von Freytag-Loringhoven
- Other work: writer, military historian

Hugo Friedrich Philipp Johann Freiherr von Freytag-Loringhoven (May 20, 1855 – October 19, 1924) was a Prussian general and a writer on military matters, being awarded the Pour le Mérite in 1916 for his work as a historian.

== Biography ==
He was born on May 20, 1855, in Copenhagen, Denmark, the son of a diplomat, Karl von Freytag-Loringhoven (1811–1882). His family was Baltic German and originated in Westphalia.

He entered the Imperial German Army in 1877, a few years after German unification, as a lieutenant. From 1887 to 1896 he taught military history at the Prussian Military Academy in Berlin. He then worked for a while for Alfred von Schlieffen, later being described as "Schlieffen's favorite disciple", and in 1907 took command of the 12th Regiment of Grenadiers at Frankfurt an der Oder. In 1910 he became Oberquartiermeister, and in December 1913 took command of the 22nd Division at Cassel.

With the mobilisation of troops in 1914 for World War I, he became firstly a liaison officer with the Austro-Hungarian forces. He then returned to the Supreme Army Command as Stellvertretender Generalquartiermeister (Deputy Quartermaster-General), where he became an unofficial adviser to Erich von Falkenhayn although he bemoaned his lack of influence. He briefly led the 9th Reserve Corps, then the 17th Reserve Division, and in September 1916 went back to the Supreme Army Command. On April 18, 1918, he was promoted to General of the Infantry.

He died on October 19, 1924, in Weimar at the age of 69.

== Publications ==
His published works include:

- Studien über die Kriegsführung im Sezessionskrieg (1897)
- Deductions from the World War the English translation of Folgerungen aus dem Weltkriege (1918)
- Heerführung Moltke's und Napoleons (1910)
- Generalfeldmarschall Graf Schlieffen (1910)
- A nation trained in arms or a militia? Lessons in war from the past and the present (1918)
- Kriegsführung und Politik (1918)
- Menschen und Dinge, wie ich sie in meinem Leben sah (1923)
- Die Psyche Der Heere (1923)

== Family ==
His son, Baron Leopold von Freytag-Loringhoven, married the Dadaist artist and poet Elsa von Freytag-Loringhoven.

== See also ==
- Freytag-Loringhoven

== Sources ==
- Antulio Joseph Echevarria, "General Staff Historian Hugo Freiherr von Freytag-Loringhoven and the Dialectics of German Military Thought", The Journal of Military History, no 60, 1996.
- Foley, R. T. (2007) [2005]. German Strategy and the Path to Verdun: Erich von Falkenhayn and the Development of Attrition, 1870–1916 (pbk. ed.). Cambridge: CUP. ISBN 978-0-521-04436-3.
- Bernd Freiherr Freytag v. Loringhoven, Freytag von Loringhoven: Eine Kurzgefasste Familiengeschichte, Munich, 1986.

Military offices
| Preceded by Adolf Wild von Hohenborn | Quartermaster-General of the German Army; 21 January 1915 – 29 August 1916 | Succeeded by Erich Ludendorff |
