= Willy Freitag =

American soccer player

William "Willy" Freitag is a former U.S. soccer defender. Freitag earned three caps with the U.S. national team in 1960 and 1961. His first two games came in World Cup qualifiers in November 1960. The first game was a 3–3 tie and the second a 3–0 loss, both to Mexico. His third, and final, game for the United States was a 2–0 loss to Colombia on February 5, 1961.
