= Bernd Freytag von Loringhoven =

German military officer

Bernd Freiherr Freytag von Loringhoven
- Born: 24 January [O.S. 11 January] 1914; Arensburg Governorate of Livonia, Russian Empire (now Kuressaare, Estonia)
- Died: 27 February 2007 (aged 93); Munich, Bavaria, Germany
- Burial place: Munich Northern Cemetery
- Military career
- Allegiance: Nazi Germany; West Germany
- Branch: German Army (Wehrmacht); German Army (Bundeswehr)
- Service years: 1933–45; 1956–73
- Rank: Generalleutnant
- Commands: CS Armed Forces Staff
- Conflicts: World War II

Alexander Otto Hermann Wolfgang Bernd(t) Freiherr Freytag von Loringhoven (6 February 1914 – 27 February 2007), was a Baltic German officer in the German Army during World War II. In 1956, he joined the West German Federal Armed Forces, the Bundeswehr, and rose to the rank of Generalleutnant.

== Early life ==
The Frydag, including the Freytag-Loringhoven, family was an ancient Baltic German noble family of Westphalian origin, originating in Münster. They were first mentioned in the 12th century (Baron: Livonia, Courland 1198; Master of the Teutonic Order 1485, Gotha Register 1896, 1934 1942). He was born in Arensburg, Governorate of Livonia (now Kuressaare, Estonia) to Baron Burchard Haro Charles Napoleon Freytag von Loringhoven and Leonide Klara Oda von Möller. The family left their ancestral home after Estonia proclaimed independence in 1918, and the German land titles and assets were confiscated. After one year of law studies at the University of Königsberg, he joined the Reichswehr in 1933. He was promoted to Leutnant in 1937.

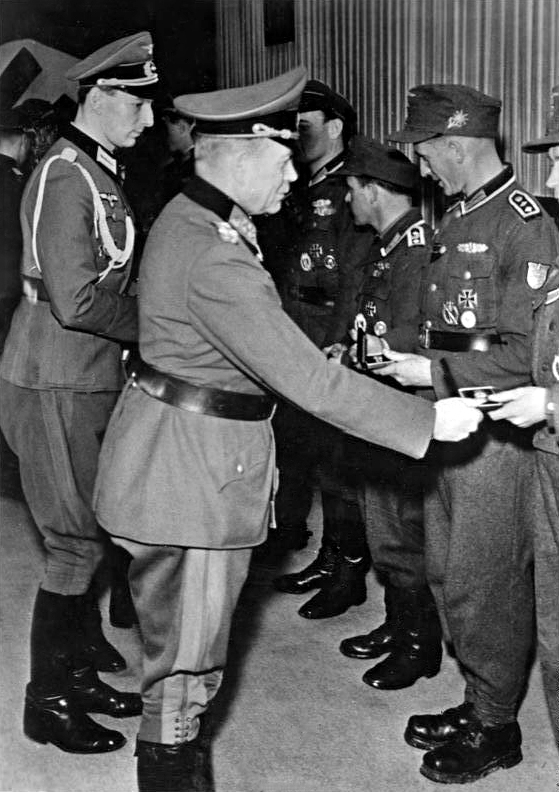
Freytag von Loringhoven (1945)

== World War II ==
In late 1942, the tank battalion under Loringhoven's command was encircled during the Soviet counter-offensive at the Battle of Stalingrad. In January 1943, he was flown out of the pocket on one of the last Luftwaffe flights out of the city and later transferred to the staff of 111th Infantry Division on 2 March 1943. On 23 January 1943, he was awarded the German Cross in Gold as Hauptmann (captain) in the 2nd Battalion, 2nd Panzer Regiment, 16th Panzer Division (Wehrmacht). In November 1943, Loringhoven was promoted to major. From July 1944 to April 1945, he served as an adjutant to the Chief of Army General Staff (first, General Heinz Guderian and then General Hans Krebs).

== Berlin 1945 ==
Loringhoven's last assignment was as a staff officer responsible for the preparation of reports for Adolf Hitler. This work required a constant presence in Hitler's entourage. After 23 April 1945, when Hitler's communications staff began to desert, he had to improvise and he based his intelligence reports on information he was able to gather from the Allied news agencies Reuters and the BBC. Hitler was not aware of this.

In the evening of 29 April, he left the Führerbunker with Gerhard Boldt and Lieutenant-Colonel Rudolf Weiss. That morning, Loringhoven had approached Krebs and asked if he and Boldt could leave Berlin and "return to the fighting troops". Krebs talked to Burgdorf to get his advice. Burgdorf approved but indicated that they should take his assistant, Weiss. Hitler was approached for his approval at midday. Surprisingly, he asked many questions and offered his advice. Hitler asked, "How are you going to get out of Berlin?" When Loringhoven mentioned finding a boat, Hitler became enthusiastic and advised, "You must get an electric boat, because that does not make any noise and you can get through the Russian lines." When he agreed that an electric boat would be best but added that, if necessary, they might have to use a different craft, Hitler was suddenly exhausted. He shook hands limply with each of them and quickly dismissed the group.

All three men left the Reich Chancellery grounds, first crawling and then running under fire to the Tiergarten. From there the men reached the Zoo station. It had taken them hours to get that far. Loringhoven had packed some food, maps and carried a machine-pistol for the journey. The men had been tasked with trying to reach General Walther Wenck's Twelfth Army, tell of the dire situation and request relief for Berlin. The men reached Pichelsdorf where they obtained a boat from some Hitler Youth and then headed south on the Havel river. By 3 May, Weiss had become separated from his companions and was captured. Loringhoven and Boldt changed into civilian clothes and reached Wittenberg where they registered under false names at a camp. They soon left and reached the Elbe river, which they crossed by boat. Then after swimming across the Mulde river, the two men went their separate ways.

== Post-war ==
Loringhoven almost made it to Leipzig where his family was living, but was detained by a US Army soldier who did not believe his story and put in a jail cell for a few days. Later, a British major took him to an interrogation camp at Bad Nenndorf. He then was taken to a camp near Ostend and lastly ended up in Adelheide camp, near Delmenhorst. After his release in January 1948, Loringhoven lived in Munich, where he became a publisher. He joined the German Federal Armed Forces (Bundeswehr) in 1956 after West Germany joined NATO. He served in various army and NATO positions; his highest rank was lieutenant-general. He was later appointed Deputy Inspector General of the Armed Forces and retired from the army in 1973, with full honours.

Late in life, Loringhoven, long a knight of the Order of Saint John (Bailiwick of Brandenburg), actively served the Order as its chancellor and governor. At the time of his death at the age of 93, he was one of the last three known living witnesses (along with bunker telephone operator Rochus Misch and Hitler Youth courier Armin D. Lehmann) to the events in the Führerbunker at the end of World War II.

== Works ==
- Loringhoven, Bernd Freytag von and d'Alançon, François (2006). In the Bunker with Hitler: The Last Witness Speaks, London, ISBN 0-297-84555-1

Military offices
| Preceded by Generalleutnant Herbert Büchs | Deputy Chief of Staff of the Federal Armed Forces; 1971–1973 | Succeeded by Generalleutnant Karl Schnell |
| Preceded by Generalmajor Heinz Hükelheim | Commander of 5. Panzer-Division (Bundeswehr); 1 October 1967 – 30 April 1969 | Succeeded by Generalmajor Hans-Joachim von Hopffgarten |
| Preceded by Generalmajor Hans-Georg von Tempelhoff | Commander of 3rd Panzer Division (Bundeswehr); 1 April 1967 – 21 September 1967 | Succeeded by Generalmajor Walter Carganico |
