= Church of the Assumption of Mary, Koryciny =

Historic church in Koryciny, Poland

Church of the Assumption of Mary
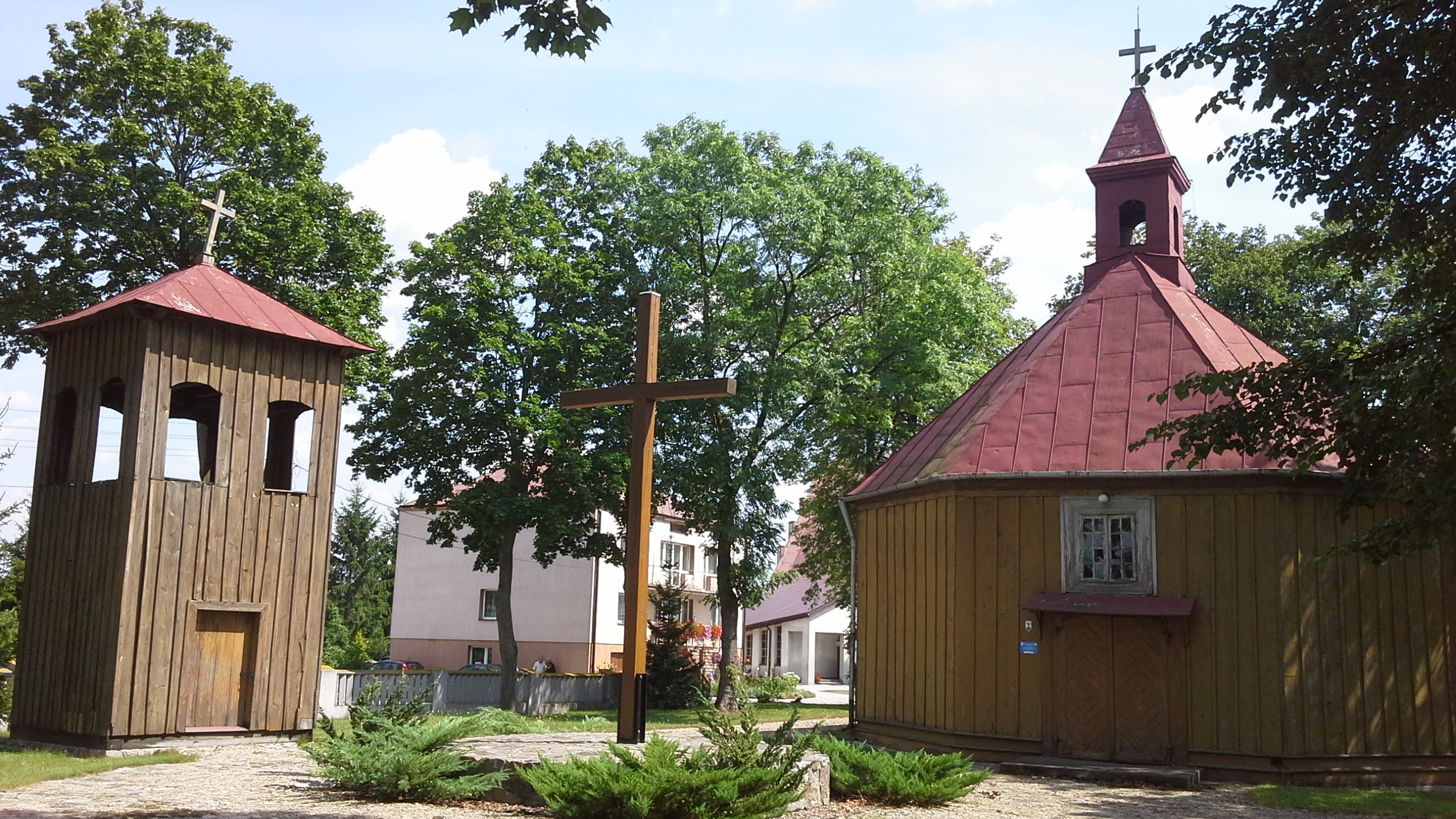
- General view of the church and bell tower from the west (2014)
- Church of the Assumption of Mary
- 52°38′35.70″N 22°45′55.62″E
- Location: Koryciny
- Country: Poland
- Denomination: Catholic
- Previous denomination: Eastern Orthodoxy
- Churchmanship: Latin Church

History
- Founder: Marek Butler
- Dedication: Assumption of Mary
- Dedicated: 1709

Architecture
- Completed: 1709
- Closed: end of the 20th century

Specifications
- Materials: wood

Administration
- Parish: Parish of the Holy Trinity, Rudka

The Church of the Assumption of Mary is a historic building originally constructed as a Uniate church, later an Orthodox church, and since 1923 a Roman Catholic church. Erected in 1709 in Grodzisk, it was relocated in 2016 to Koryciny.

The Orthodox parish in Grodzisk existed before 1604, when a wooden church is first mentioned. It is unclear whether the local community remained Orthodox or fully adopted the Union of Brest in 1596. The current building, funded by Drohiczyn starosta Marek Antoni Butler, replaced an older structure in 1709. Like all Uniate churches in Podlachia, it featured Latinized furnishings, including organs, and after 1726, lacked an iconostasis. A copy of the Sokalska Icon of the Mother of God, possibly venerated since the mid-18th century, was a focal point of devotion.

Between 1835 and 1838, most Latin elements were removed as part of a de-Latinization campaign preparing the Uniate Lithuanian diocese for conversion to Orthodoxy. Several Uniate icons, including the Sokalska Icon, remained and continued to be venerated after the parish's conversion to Orthodoxy in February 1839, following the Synod of Polotsk, which abolished the Uniate Church outside the Eparchy of Chełm–Belz. The parson had agreed to convert in 1838.

The church remained active until 1891, when a new brick Orthodox church was completed in Grodzisk. The older building was then abandoned, with some furnishings transferred to the new church. In 1923, it was reconsecrated as a Roman Catholic parish church and adapted for Latin liturgy. It served this role until the late 20th century, when a larger brick Catholic church was built in Grodzisk, leaving the wooden church unused.

Until 2016, the church stood in central Grodzisk, near the new Catholic parish church and opposite the Orthodox Church of St. Nicholas. In 2016, it was relocated to Koryciny.

The building was listed in the Polish Register of Monuments under No. 282 on 18 November 1966.

== History ==
=== First church in Grodzisk ===
The earliest record of a church in Grodzisk dates to 1604. Its denominational status at the time is uncertain. The parish adopted the Union of Brest in 1596 with the Eparchy of Volodymyr and Brest, but resistance to abandoning Orthodoxy persisted in the region until the mid-17th century. The Uniate Church became widespread only in the latter half of the century. The church built in 1709 was undoubtedly a Uniate Catholic church.

=== Uniate church ===
The church was funded by Marek Antoni Butler, Drohiczyn starosta, likely with support from Grodzisk leaseholder Wiktoryn Kuczyński. A 1726 canonical visitation described it as new, with a shingle roof and a free-standing bell tower, surrounded by a cemetery. It had two altars with images of the Nativity of the Blessed Virgin Mary and St. Nicholas, retained royal doors, and included a new image of Our Lady of Sorrows and eight smaller "Moscow images" (icons from its Orthodox period). By 1757, St. Nicholas was noted as the patron, and the wooden, single-domed church's shingle roof needed repair. The priest, Father Józef Artychowski, was ordered to renovate it. The main altar, resembling Latin altars, housed an image of the Blessed Virgin Mary, possibly the Sokalska Icon, which became a significant devotional object by the late 18th century. The exact year the image was installed in the church cannot be determined. According to one hypothesis, it originally came from the Benedictine convent in Łomża and had been gifted by a nun named Rybińska to the Church of the Intercession of the Theotokos in Czarna Cerkiewna. The nun died before the image could be delivered, and it instead ended up in Siemiony, in a manor whose owner intended to create a private devotional site. However, local Greek Catholics managed to steal the image and bring it to Czarna Cerkiewna. How it later arrived in Grodzisk remains unknown.

In 1789, the church was described as old. Before this, a late 17th- or early 18th-century altar from the chapel of the Order of Saint Basil the Great in Warsaw was installed. The parish, noted in 1784, served 694 people, mostly from Makarki and Smarklice, with smaller numbers from Grodzisk, Drochlin, and Sypnie.

The 1798 list of Uniate parishes in the Diocese of Supraśl omits Grodzisk, but in 1838, it was listed in the Bielsk deanery of the Uniate Vilnius metropolitan diocese, with 738 attendees, 578 of whom fulfilled confession and communion during Lent. Conversions to the Latin rite were rare.

In the 1830s, the Uniate Vilnius consistory, led by Bishop Joseph Semashko, began delatinizing Uniate churches to prepare for their integration into the Russian Orthodox Church. Grodzisk's church was among three significant churches in the Drohiczyn deanery, alongside those in Żerczyce and Boćki. In 1836, it received liturgical books for synodal rite services. Its furnishings were heavily Latinized, typical for Podlachian Uniate churches, lacking an iconostasis and featuring organs. Uniquely, it lacked a Latin-style ciborium.

In 1835, an iconostasis, main altar, and offertory table were installed. By 1836, it had complete Orthodox liturgical utensils, and the organs were removed. Installing icons in the iconostasis was delayed, as landowner Count Grzegorz Ossoliński funded only the iconostasis structure, not the icons, which parishioners also refused to finance. Father Stefan Budziłowicz demanded Ossoliński provide liturgical vestments. In June 1838, the Drohiczyn Land Court ruled against Budziłowicz's claims, but the Lithuanian consistory's appeal to the Białystok district governor led Ossoliński to fund the icons and furnishings by late 1838. An 18th-century pulpit was also removed.

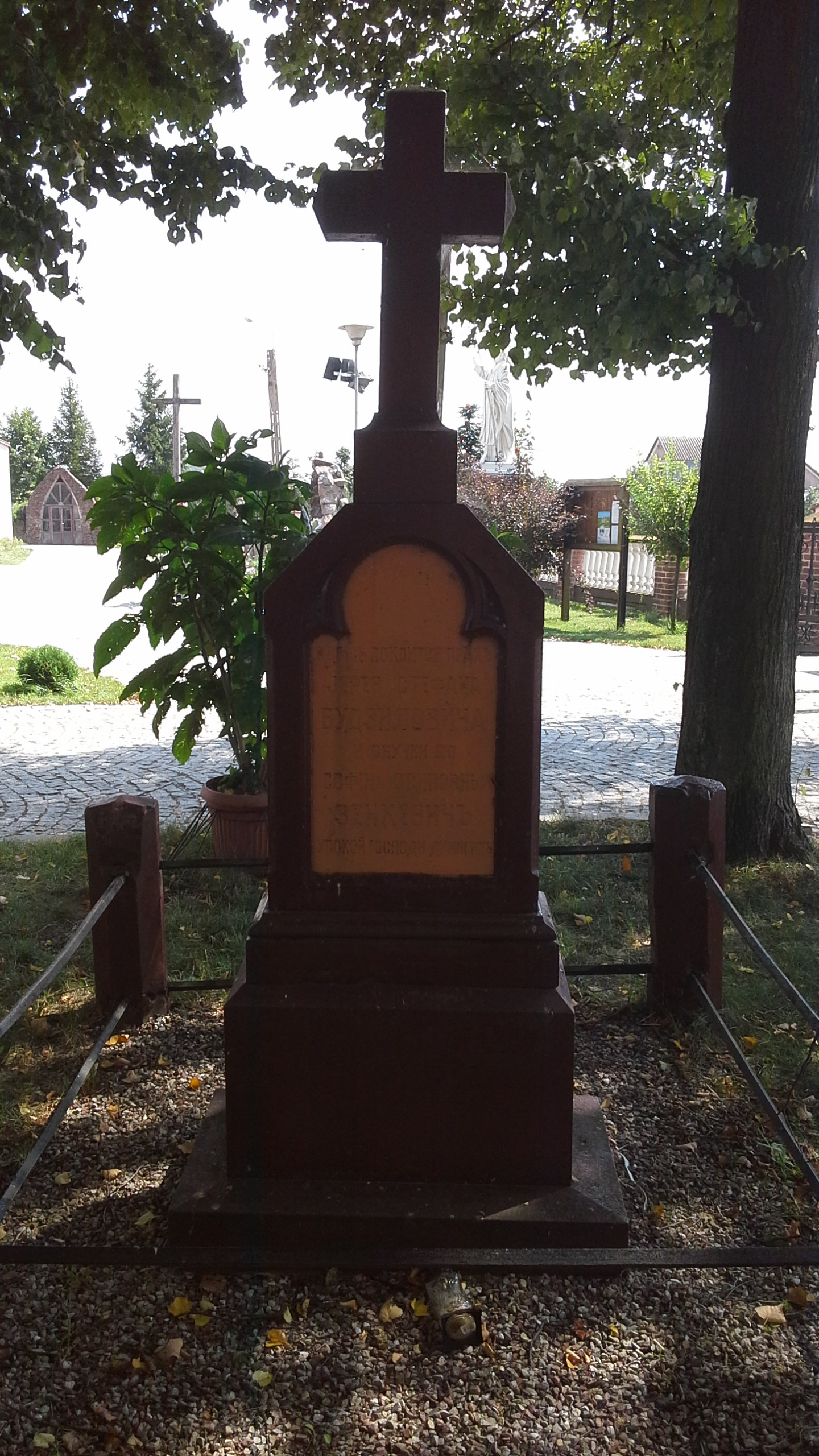
Grave of Father Stefan Budziłowicz and his granddaughter Sofia Zienkiewicz near the former church

In March 1838, district governor Miedwiediew criticized the Drohiczyn dean for tolerating Latin elements in churches, including Grodzisk's. The dean sought guidance from the consistory on permissible elements. Auxiliary Bishop Anthony Zubko intervened, asking Białystok governor Gunaropula to curb Miedwiediew's interference, and the request was granted. Father Budziłowicz agreed to convert to Orthodoxy in July 1838.

=== Orthodox church ===
In February 1839, following the Synod of Polotsk, the Grodzisk parish converted to Orthodoxy. The church still lacked some Orthodox furnishings; in 1840, Dean Piotr Baranowski requested a jug for warm water and a tabernacle free of charge. Several Uniate-era items remained. By 1857, 742 people attended the church.

The former Uniate church served the parish until 1891, when a new brick Orthodox church was built across the street. The wooden church's poor condition prompted the new construction, and its use ceased. The Sokalska Icon, still venerated, was transferred to the new church.

=== Catholic church ===
In 1923, the building was taken over by the Roman Catholic Church and established as a parish. From 1924 to 1926, its interior was adapted for Latin liturgy, with further renovations between 1956 and 1957 and 1964. By the late 20th century, a new brick Catholic church rendered the wooden church obsolete. Its condition deteriorated.

=== Relocation ===
In 2010, residents opposed relocating the church to the Ciechanowiec Museum of Agriculture. In 2016, it was moved to a skansen at the Podlachian Botanical Garden in Koryciny, where it resumed regular liturgical use.

== Architecture and furnishings ==
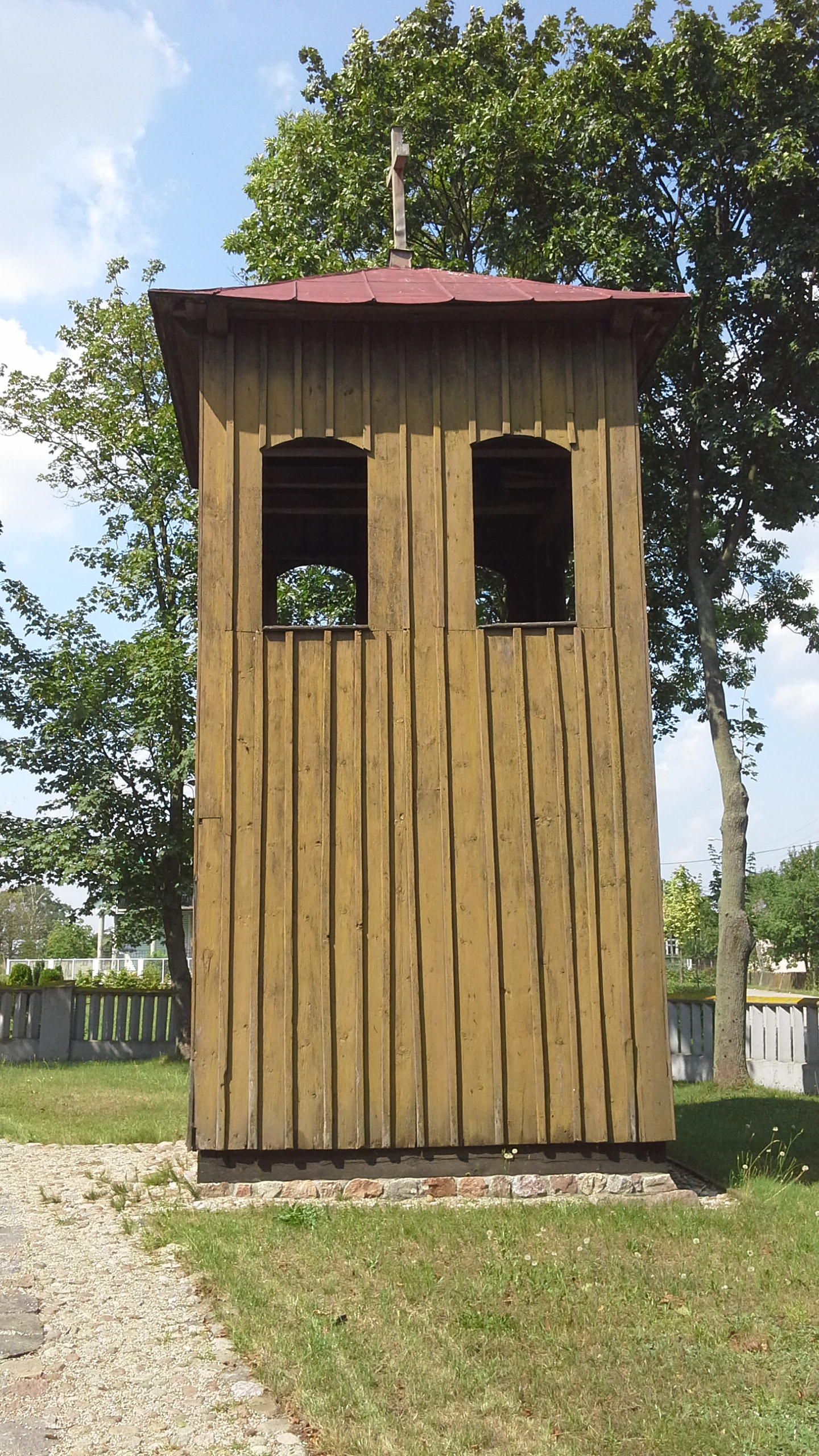
Free-standing bell tower

The church is a wooden, oriented, clapboarded structure with a tri-nave layout and a gable roof. It features a distinct two-part chancel, narrowing eastward with a double-sided closure, connected to a storage room and sacristy. Pillars mark the nave boundaries, and the main nave has a rounded barrel-vaulted ceiling. A choir loft is above the western entrance. The chancel retains a Baroque altar from Warsaw, with a 19th-century folk painting of the Holy Trinity in its retable. The main altar field features a sculptural group of angels adoring Mary (her face modeled on Our Lady of the Gate of Dawn), created in the early 20th century. Originally, the Sokalska Icon occupied this space, moved to the St. Nicholas Church in 1924. The composition is covered by an 18th-century icon of the Dormition of the Theotokos. A 19th-century side altar with a folk Crucifixion painting, an 18th-century holy water stoup (formerly a baptismal font), a tabernacle in storage, and an early 19th-century funeral cross with Christ's figure are also present.

In Grodzisk, the church was near the grave of Father Stefan Budziłowicz, the last Uniate and first 19th-century Orthodox priest, who died in 1857.

== Bibliography ==
- Matus, I. (2013). Schyłek unii i proces restytucji prawosławia w obwodzie białostockim w latach 30. XIX wieku [The Decline of the Union and the Process of Restoring Orthodoxy in the Białystok District in the 1830s] (in Polish). Białystok: University of Białystok Publishing House. ISBN 978-83-7431-364-3.
