= Mazuration =

Merger of sibilants in Polish dialects

Mazuration, also known as mazurzenie (Polish pronunciation: [mazuˈʐɛɲɛ]) or more rarely sakanie, is the replacement or merger of Polish's series of postalveolar fricatives and affricates /ʂ, ʐ, t͡ʂ, d͡ʐ/ (written ⟨sz, ż, cz, dż⟩) into the dentialveolar series /s, z, t͡s, d͡z/ (written ⟨s, z, c, dz⟩). This merger is present in many dialects, but is named for the Masovian dialect.

This phonological feature is observed in dialects of Masuria and Masovia (Masovian dialect), as well as in most of Lesser Poland and parts of Silesia. There are also some peripheral mazurating islands in Greater Poland. The boundary of mazurzenie runs from north-east to south-west. It may have originated between the 14th and 16th centuries in the Masovian dialect. The feature is linked to the process of depalatalization (reduction of the number of palatalized consonants) similar to the phenomena of jabłonkowanie and kaszubienie in other dialects.

In this article, terms such as "non-mazurating", "without mazuration" are taken to refer to dialects which have a three way distinction among sibilants, as does Standard Polish. Technically dialects with e.g. jabłonkowanie also do not mazurate, but for the sake of simplicity this will not be discussed in the article.

== Distribution ==
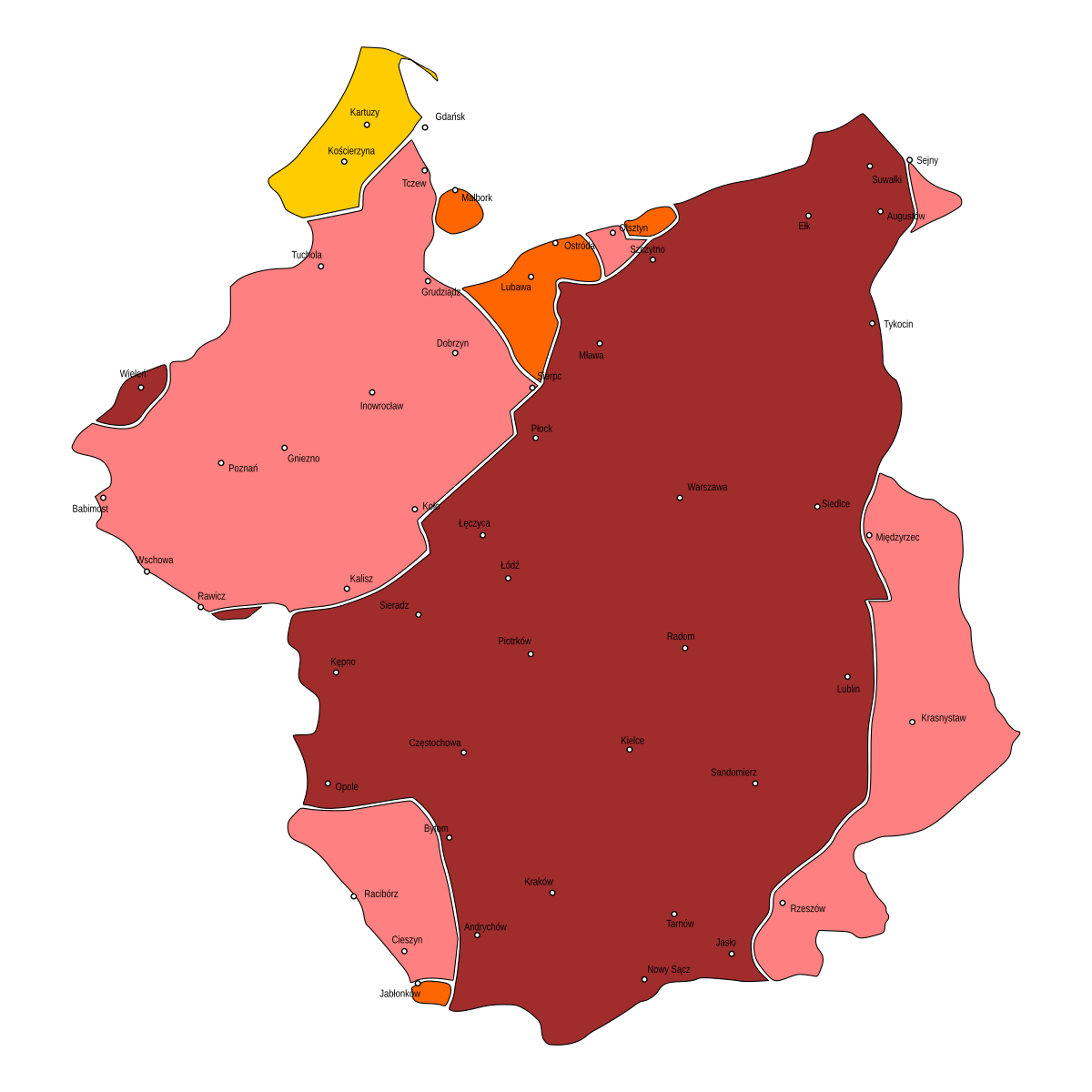
Map of Polish dialects. Dialects with mazuration are shown in dark red.

Mazuration is a widespread phenomenon. It is present in Masovia including Masuria (former Ducal Prussia), all of Lesser Poland except the southeast areas bordering on Ukraine, eastern and northern Upper Silesia including Opole and Katowice, as well as the central Polish lands around Sieradz, Łęczyca and Łowicz. A peculiarity are three mazurating islands on the periphery of Greater Poland: several towns around Wieleń (Note: The so-called Mazurzy wieleńscy. The villages are: Rosko, Wrzeszczyna, Drawsko, Pęckowo, Piłka, Miały and others.), several more near Rawicz (Note: The so-called Chazacy. The villages are: Szkaradowo, Chojno, Zielona Wieś.) and Chwalim (Note: Chwalim was left without any native inhabitants after World War II. It is not included in the map on the right) – a single village near Wolsztyn.

Non-mazurating territories in the west include Greater Poland, Kuyavia and the Lands of Chełmno and Dobrzyń, southwestern Upper Silesia, Pomeralia and former Royal Prussia (Warmia, areas around Ostróda and Lubawa). Eastern Polish dialects which border on Ukraine, Belarus and Lithuania also do not mazurate. These include the eastern reaches of Lesser Poland around the rivers San and Wisłok (around Rzeszów and Przemyśl; historically part of Red Ruthenia), areas east of Wieprz (Lublin Land), Podlachia and some areas in the Suwałki Region (Sejny, Puńsk).

== Description ==
Standard (or literary) Polish has three symmetrical series of sibilant fricatives and affricates articulated by directing the airstream through the teeth. These are the dentialveolar, alveolo-palatal, and postalveolar (usually called retroflex by Western scholars, but they are not subapical). These are presented in the table below.

Non-mazurating pronunciation
		Denti- alveolar	Post- alveolar	Alveolo- palatal
Affricate	voiceless	t͡s	t͡ʂ	t͡ɕ
Affricate	voiced	d͡z	d͡ʐ	d͡ʑ
Fricative	voiceless	s	ʂ	ɕ
Fricative	voiced	z	ʐ	ʑ

The dentialveolar and postalveolar series are considered hard (unpalatalized) and can be followed by [ɨ], and never by [i] (except very recent borrowings). On the contrary, the alveolo-palatal series is considered soft (palatal or palatalized) and can be followed by [i] but never by [ɨ]. These two sounds are nowadays usually analyzed as separate phonemes, but until recently they were considered allophones and they are still largely in complementary distribution, contrasting mostly in positions after labials (unless palatalized labials are considered separate phonemes) and recent loanwords (see also: Polish phonology – a relevant section). For earlier (pre-modern) stages of Polish [i] and [ɨ] must be considered allophones of a single phoneme /i/.

To fully understand not only the phenomenon itself, but to be able to discuss its origins and chronology it is necessary to look at the phonological history of these sounds in Polish. Below is the system as it looked like from around the 13th century until the 16th century (see also: Old Polish – section on phonology).

Pre-split pronunciation
		Denti- alveolar	Post- alveolar	Alveolo- palatal
Affricate	voiceless	t͡sʲ	t͡ʃ	t͡ɕ
Affricate	voiced	d͡zʲ	d͡ʒ	d͡ʑ
Fricative	voiceless	s	ʃ	ɕ
Fricative	voiced	z	ʒ	ʑ

The principal difference from the modern system is that the postalveolar series was soft (palato-alveolar): /ʃ/, /ʒ/, /t͡ʃ/, /d͡ʒ/. In contrast to Modern Polish these sounds were followed by [i] rather than [ɨ]. The two affricates /t͡sʲ/ and /d͡z/ were similarly soft: /t͡sʲ/, /d͡zʲ/.

Another important fact was that from around the 13th century there existed the /r̝/ phoneme, which descended from earlier softened /rʲ/. Its pronunciation could be described as between [r] and [ʒ], being both a trill and a fricative (the Czech language still has this sound).

The hardening (depalatalization) of the postalveolar series and the affricates /t͡sʲ/ and /d͡zʲ/ happened around the 16th century. In non-mazurating dialects the resultant system was as described at the beginning of this section. In mazurating dialects the system was instead simplified, and the postalveolar sibilants merged completely with the dentialveolars:

Mazurating pronunciation
		Denti- alveolar	Alveolo- palatal
Affricate	voiceless	t͡s	t͡ɕ
Affricate	voiced	d͡z	d͡ʑ
Fricative	voiceless	s	ɕ
Fricative	voiced	z	ʑ

leaving only two series of sibilants. The two earlier soft affricates depalatalized as in the other dialects. Significantly, the new dentialveolars, continuing earlier postalveolars, are now also hard, as in the non-masurating dialects, so [ɨ] always follows them, not [i] (but see below).

Also important is the fate of /r̝/: in most dialects, both mazurating and not, this sound shifted to [ʐ] around the 18th century. In dialects without mazuration this caused its merger with former original /ʐ/. Since Polish spelling follows etymology, this sound is spelled ⟨rz⟩, while the original /ʐ/ is spelled ⟨ż⟩. But in mazurating dialects there was already no /ʐ/ to begin with, so that phoneme only changed its articulation. In these dialects also [ʂ] is an allophone of /ʐ/ in devoicing positions (at the end of the utterance, adjacent to voiceless sounds and in some dialects always at word end). The changing of every modern /ʐ/ to /z/, regardless of etymology, is a case of hypercorrection stemming from an attempt to imitate mazuration.

Below are some examples which showcase the differences between mazurating and non-mazurating pronunciation:

Mazuration	Distinction	Literary spelling	Meaning	Notes
[sɛɕt͡ɕ]	[ʂɛɕt͡ɕ]	sześć	"six"	
[t͡sas]	[t͡ʂas]	czas	"time"	
[zɔna]	[ʐɔna]	żona	"wife"	
[st͡sɛkat͡ɕ]	[ʂt͡ʂɛkat͡ɕ]	szczekać	"to bark"	
[jɛzd͡zɛ]	[jɛʐd͡ʐɛ]	jeżdżę	"I drive; I ride"	
[ʐut͡sat͡ɕ]	[ʐut͡sat͡ɕ]	rzucać	"to throw"	etymological /r̝/
[pʂɛt]	[pʂɛt]	przed	"before; in front of"	etymological /r̝/
[mɔzɛ]	[mɔʐɛ]	może	"maybe"	homophones without mazuration
[mɔʐɛ]	[mɔʐɛ]	morze	"sea"	homophones without mazuration
[sɨtɨ]	[sɨtɨ]	syty	"full (having eaten enough)"	homophones with mazuration
[sɨtɨ]	[ʂɨtɨ]	szyty	"sewn"	homophones with mazuration

== Causes ==
Several hypotheses have been put forth to explain the origin of mazuration. Very heated discussions on this subject took place in Polish academic circles from 1947 into the 1950s. Naturally the question of dating, which was discussed even more, is very closely connected.

=== Foreign influence ===
Stanisław Dobrzycki was the first to suggest Old Prussian substrate influence as the origin of mazuration. This hypothesis was later expanded by Selishchev and Milewski. It has been shown that in Polish loanwords in Old Prussian the Polish postalveolar fricatives /ʂ, ʐ/ are regularly substituted by the dentialveolar fricatives /s, z/, eg. dūsai- from Polish dusza, supana from Polish żupan (Old Prussian /z/ is spelled ⟨s⟩). According to this theory mazuration was a feature of speech of Polonized Prussians in Mazuria (see Masurian dialects), and spread from there. This is consistent with the accounts that the phenomenon began somewhere in Masovia and spread from there. Taszycki agrees that possible Prussian substrate should be taken into account, while Urbańczyk is critical of the theory and asserts that Polonizing Prussians caused the emergence of siakanie in the dialects of Malbork-Lubawa, not mazurzenie in Masuria.

Other proposals seeking to explain the origin of mazuration in terms of language contact include the idea of German influence developed by Trautmann using similar arguments as described above for Old Prussian, as well as prehistoric Celtic or even Uralic influences. Milewski rejects the latter two outright, as he deems them impossible to either prove or disprove based on historical records.

=== Internal development ===
It is often considered (first by linguist Halina Koneczna) that mazuration is directly linked to the abovementioned depalatalizations of the postalveolar series around the 16th century, whereby the palato-alveolar /ʃ/, /ʒ/, /t͡ʃ/, /d͡ʒ/ turned into the retroflex /ʂ/, /ʐ/, /t͡ʂ/, /d͡ʐ/ on the non-mazurating territories, but into /s/, /z/, /t͡s/, /d͡z/ in mazurating dialects. In the former case these phonemes merely changed their manner of articulation to unpalatalized, while in the latter case the loss of such a distinct feature caused them to coalesce together with the dentialveolars. The different treatment in different dialects could then perhaps be explained by an older difference in the pronunciation of that series.

It has also been proposed that this and similar mergers (jabłonkowanie, kaszubienie; see below) were caused by the overloading of the Old Polish phonological system by sibilants. The acoustics of the three series /s.../, /ʂ.../, /ɕ.../ were not distinct enough from each other, and so the majority of dialects merged two of them. This would put mazurzenie, jabłonkowanie and kaszubienie as parallel processes, with the same cause, just different result. This hypothesis was first put forth by Rudnicki, and later endorsed and continued by Vaillant and Tadeusz Brajerski, the latter citing parallel developments in the history of Lower Sorbian. (Note: In the history of Lower Sorbian a process similar to mazuration affected older /t͡ʃ/, but at the same time neither /ʃ/ nor /ʒ/ were affected. The probable cause was that there also existed the phoneme /t͡ɕ/, while there was no corresponding †/ɕ/ or †/ʑ/.) Milewski adds to this also similar examples in the history of Mongolic languages. Together with Koneczna and Kuryłowicz he opines, however, that this cannot be the main cause of this phenomenon, as it did not affect the entirety of the Polish speaking area, in spite of the conditions being the same everywhere. It must therefore be posited that it was only one of the causes of mazuration, a prerequisite but not a deciding factor.

A unique theory proposed by Kuryłowicz also states that the origin of mazuration is connected to the aforementioned depalatalization, but in a different way. Namely, taking into account the fact that the change /ʃ.../ > /ʂ.../ did not happen everywhere at the same time, he posits that in areas where dialects which had already undergone the change (innovative dialects) neighbored dialects which still had the older pronunciation (archaic dialects), the archaic dialects wanted to introduce this sound change themselves (as the change was an innovation it had a tendency to spread). But these dialects, not finding suitable sounds to reproduce the new sounds /ʂ/ and /ʐ/ in their own phonological system, replaced them with the known to them /s/ and /z/ (apparently deeming their nonpalatalized articulation as their primary feature, and their place of articulation as secondary). Hard /t͡s/ and /d͡z/ were borrowed from the new system to replace their own /t͡sʲ/ and /d͡zʲ/; while /t͡ʂ/ and /d͡ʐ/ could not last long causing asymmetry in the system, and likewise coalesced into /t͡s/ and /d͡z/ (the phonemic status of [d͡ʒʲ] in Old Polish is itself dubious).

== Mazuration and the literary language ==
Since the Polish literary language does not have mazuration, it has long been (usually) considered an inferior pronunciation. Those who wanted to rid their speech of this feature did not know which words should be pronounced using the postalveolar sounds – which were foreign to them – unless they heard it from a speaker with distinction, but in other cases they made frequent mistakes. The erroneous replacement of /s/, /z/, /t͡s/, /d͡z/ by /ʂ/, /ʐ/, /t͡ʂ/, /d͡ʐ/ in places where they are not etymologically justified is called szadzenie, or simply erroneous demazuration. Examples of attested words with szadzenie in Polish dialects noted in the Atlas of Polish Dialects (Atlas Gwar Polskich): proszo instead of proso ("millet, Panicum"), bydlęczy instead of bydlęcy ("bovine"), szmalec instead of smalec ("lard").

Occasionally a mazurating pronunciation of words made its way to the literary standard and became normative. Affected words include cudo ("marvel"), cudny ("marvelous"), cacko ("knick-knack"), ceber ("bucket"), dzban ("jug") – instead of Old Polish czudo, czudny, czaczko, czeber, dżban/czban – among others.

== Similar mergers ==
In other Polish dialects a different merger called jabłonkowanie happens. It is found in the dialects near Jabłonków in Silesia and in the north in Warmia and around Ostróda and Lubawa and causes the merger of Standard Polish alveolopalatal consonants and retroflex consonants into an intermediate series. Jabłonkowanie is commonly discussed together with mazuration as possibly stemming from the same causes (see above in the "Causes" section).

Kaszubienie is a merger of alveolopalatal and dental sibilants in the Kashubian language.

A phonomenon similar to mazuration also occurs in a few areas of the Chakavian dialect of Croatian, where it is known as tsakavism.

In the Belarusian language mazuration was borrowed by the dialects of a few villages in Podlachia (Note: These are: to the northwest of Siemiatycze – Zajęczniki, Rogawka, Cecele, Klukowo, Makarki, Czarna Wielka, Czarna Średnia; to the west of Bielsk Podlaski – Malesze, Świrydy, Szpaki, Bujnowo; and to the northwest of Międzyrzec the village of Próchenki.) directly from neighboring Polish dialects.

The now extinct Polabian language exhibited a parallel change in some of its dialects. Of the surviving material Pfeffinger's Vocabulaire Vandale rather consistently distinguishes the reflexes of Proto-Slavic *s, *z, *c and *š, *ž, *č, while the other works seem to represent a dialect (or dialects) which merged those sounds.

A more narrow merger affecting only voiceless affricates occurs in some other Slavic areas. In East Slavic it is present in Northern Russian dialects. In those areas Standard Russian /t͡s/ (from PS *c) and /t͡ɕ/ (from PS *č) have completely merged, and are pronounced /t͡s/, /t͡sʲ/ or /t͡ɕ/ depending on dialect. This feature is termed tsokanye (Russian: цоканье) if the merger is towards a dental affricate and chokanye (Russian: чоканье) if it is towards a postalveolar affricate. Among the West Slavic languages, Lower Sorbian changed the earlier /t͡ʃ/ into /t͡s/, while in Upper Sorbian they remain distinct.

== See also ==
- Jabłonkowanie
- Szadzenie
- Ts–ch merger
- Sabesdiker losn
- Depalatalization

== Bibliography ==
- Kuraszkiewicz, Władysław (1972). Gramatyka historyczna języka polskiego (in Polish). Warszawa: Państwowe Zakłady Wydawnictw Szkolnych.
- Klemensiewicz, Zenon (1985). Historia języka polskiego (in Polish). Warszawa: Państwowe Wydawnictwo Naukowe.
- Rospond, Stanisław (1973). Gramatyka historyczna języka polskiego (in Polish). Warszawa: Państwowe Wydawnictwo Naukowe.
- Dejna, Karol (1993). Dialekty polskie (in Polish). Wrocław: Zakład Narodowy im. Ossolińskich. ISBN 83-04-04129-4.
- Nitsch, Kazimierz (1958). Pisma dialektologiczne (in Polish). Wrocław–Kraków: Zakład Narodowy im. Ossolińskich.
- Urbańczyk, Stanisław (1972). Zarys dialektologii polskiej (in Polish). Warszawa: Państwowe Wydawnictwo Naukowe.
- Stieber, Zdzisław (1966). Historyczna i współczesna fonologia języka polskiego (in Polish). Warszawa: Państwowe Wydawnictwo Naukowe.
- Taszycki, Witold (1948). Dawność tzw. mazurzenia w języku polskim (in Polish). Warsaw: Towarzystwo Naukowe Warszawskie.
- Milewski, Tadeusz (1956). Chronologia i przyczyny mazurzenia (in Polish).
- Rospond, Stanisław (1983). Dawność mazurzenia w świetle grafiki staropolskiej (in Polish). Wrocław: Zakład Narodowy im. Ossolińskich.
