= Pilaki (disambiguation) =

Pilaki is a Turkish dish. Pilaki or Piłaki may also refer to

- Piłaki, Mrągowo County, a settlement in Gmina Sorkwity, Poland
- Piłaki Małe, a village in Gmina Budry, Poland
- Piłaki Wielkie, a village in Gmina Pozezdrze, Poland
- Żery-Pilaki, a village in Gmina Grodzisk, Poland
- Olga-Afroditi Pilaki (born 1989), Greek rhythmic gymnast
