= Kuty (disambiguation) =

Kuty is a town in Ukraine.

Kuty may also refer to:

- Kúty, a village in Slovakia
- Kuty, Warmian-Masurian Voivodeship, a village in Poland
- KUTY, a radio station
