= Koryciny, Siemiatycze County =

Koryciny
- Village
- Location within Poland
- Coordinates: 52°39′N 22°44′E
- Country: Poland
- Voivodeship: Podlaskie
- County: Siemiatycze
- Gmina: Grodzisk

Koryciny [kɔrɨˈt͡ɕinɨ] is a village in the administrative district of Gmina Grodzisk, within Siemiatycze County, Podlaskie Voivodeship, in north-eastern Poland.

There is a historic Church of the Assumption of Mary in the village, originally constructed as a Uniate church, later an Orthodox church, and since 1923 a Roman Catholic church. Erected in 1709 in Grodzisk, it was relocated in 2016 to Koryciny.
