= Ts–ch merger =

Phonological feature

In phonology, the ts–ch merger is the merger of the voiceless alveolar affricate /ts/ and the voiceless postalveolar affricate /tʃ/.

In Russian, it is the merger of the consonants rendered by letters Che and Tse. If the shift is towards Tse, it is called tsokanye (Russian: цоканье); the shift towards Che is called chokanye (Russian: чоканье). Both pronunciation features are found in some Northern Russian dialects.

It is a regular sound change of Lower Sorbian, but not Upper Sorbian, as seen in the difference between Lower Sorbian cas and Upper Sorbian čas, both meaning "time".

In Polish the /t͡ʃ/ → /t͡s/ merger is part of a more general dialectal feature called mazurzenie (mazuration), present in many Polish dialects but named after the Masovian dialect.

It also occurs in a few areas of the Chakavian dialect of Serbo-Croatian, known as tsakavism.

The sabesdiker losn feature of Northeastern Yiddish includes the /tʃ/ → /ts/ merger.

Greek-speaking people may merge /t͡ʃ/ (and /d͡ʒ/) into /t͡s/ (and /d͡z/) when speaking foreign languages that contain those sounds.
