= Stadniki =

Stadniki may refer to the following places:

- Stadniki, Lesser Poland Voivodeship (south Poland)
- Stadniki, Podlaskie Voivodeship (north-east Poland)
- Stadniki, Warmian-Masurian Voivodeship (north Poland)
