= SLR Siemiatycze (Makarki) =

- Location within Poland

General information
- Status: Completed
- Type: TV-Mast
- Location: Makarki, Podlaskie Voivodeship, Poland
- Coordinates: 52°33′00″N 22°46′16″E
- Owner: TP EmiTel

Height
- Height: 120 m (390 ft)

SLR Siemiatycze (Makarki) is a 120 m (393.70 ft) tall partially guyed tower, consisting of a free-standing lattice tower with a guyed mast on top, for FM and TV situated at Makarki near Siemiatycze in Podlaskie Voivodeship, Poland. It is also referred to as Makarki Directional Radio Tower.

== Major Transmitters ==
The licensed transmitters at this location are:

Type	Program	Frequency	Channel Number	Transmission Power	Transmitter Details
DVB-T TV	Multiplex 3	482 MHz	22	1.5 kW	
FM Radio	Polskie Radio Białystok; Regionalna Rozgłośnia w Białymstoku "Radio Białystok" S.A.	99,40 MHz		10 kW	

== See also ==
- List of towers
