= Żery Bystre =

- Village
- Location within Poland
- Coordinates: 52°37′N 22°39′E
- Country: Poland
- Voivodeship: Podlaskie
- County: Siemiatycze
- Gmina: Grodzisk

Żery Bystre [ˈʐɛrɨ ˈbɨstrɛ] is a village in the administrative district of Gmina Grodzisk, within Siemiatycze County, Podlaskie Voivodeship, in north-eastern Poland. It lies approximately 7 km (4 mi) north-west of Grodzisk, 26 km (16 mi) north-west of Siemiatycze, and 66 km (41 mi) south-west of the regional capital Białystok.
