= Litewka =

Litewka is a Polish surname. Notable people with the surname include:

- Łukasz Litewka (1989–2026), Polish sociologist and politician
- Marek Litewka (1948–2024), Polish actor

== See also ==
- Bogusze-Litewka, a village in Siemiatycze County in north-eastern Poland
- Kulesze-Litewka, a village in Wysokie Mazowieckie County in north-eastern Poland
