= Nowy Harsz =

- Village
- Location within Poland
- Coordinates: 54°7′37″N 21°46′15″E
- Country: Poland
- Voivodeship: Warmian-Masurian
- County: Węgorzewo
- Gmina: Pozezdrze

Nowy Harsz [ˈnɔvɨ ˈxarʂ] (German: Neu Haarschen) is a village in the administrative district of Gmina Pozezdrze, within Węgorzewo County, Warmian-Masurian Voivodeship, in northern Poland.
