= Dziaduszyn =

- Settlement
- Location within Poland
- Coordinates: 54°10′5″N 21°48′27″E
- Country: Poland
- Voivodeship: Warmian-Masurian
- County: Węgorzewo
- Gmina: Pozezdrze
- Population: 20

Dziaduszyn [d͡ʑaˈduʂɨn] (German: Charlottenhof) is a settlement in the administrative district of Gmina Pozezdrze, within Węgorzewo County, Warmian-Masurian Voivodeship, in northern Poland.

The settlement has a population of 20.
