= Kosianka Leśna =

- Village
- Location within Poland
- Coordinates: 52°35′N 22°43′E
- Country: Poland
- Voivodeship: Podlaskie
- County: Siemiatycze
- Gmina: Grodzisk
- Population: 60

Kosianka Leśna [kɔˈɕanka ˈlɛɕna] is a village in the administrative district of Gmina Grodzisk, within Siemiatycze County, Podlaskie Voivodeship, in north-eastern Poland.
