= Gmina Pozezdrze =

Gmina Pozezdrze Pozezdrze Commune
- Gmina
- Interactive map of Gmina Pozezdrze
- Coordinates (Pozezdrze): 54°8′31″N 21°51′31″E
- Country: Poland
- Voivodeship: Warmian-Masurian
- County: Węgorzewo
- Seat: Pozezdrze

Area
  - Total: 177.3 km^{2} (68.5 sq mi)

Population (2006)
  - Total: 3,498
  - Density: 19.73/km^{2} (51.10/sq mi)
- Website: http://www.pozezdrze.pl

Gmina Pozezdrze is a rural gmina (administrative district) in Węgorzewo County, Warmian-Masurian Voivodeship, in northern Poland. Its seat is the village of Pozezdrze, which lies approximately 11 kilometres (7 mi) south-east of Węgorzewo and 98 km (61 mi) north-east of the regional capital Olsztyn.

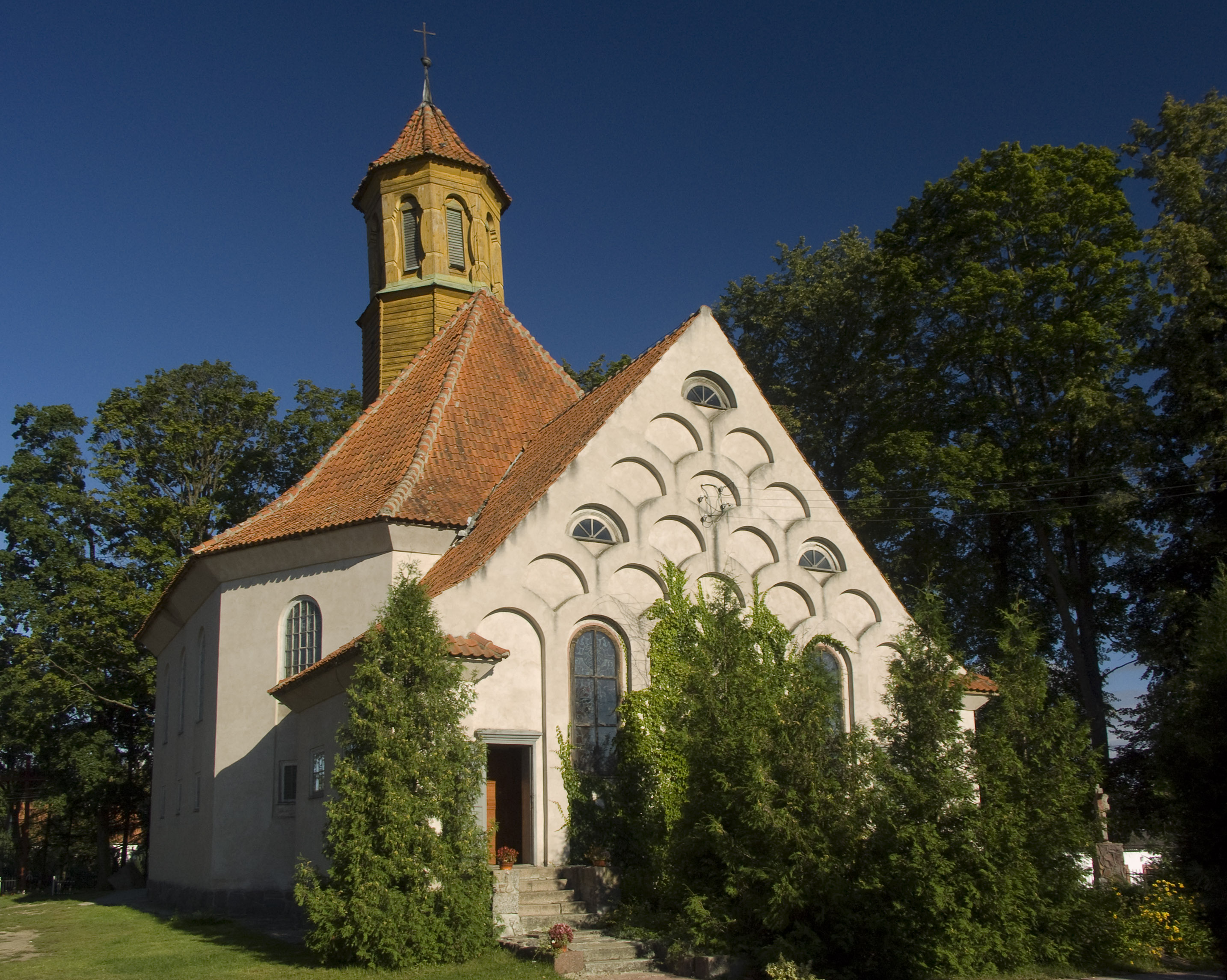

The gmina covers an area of 177.3 square kilometres (68.5 sq mi). As of 2006 its total population is 3,498.

== Villages ==
Gmina Pozezdrze contains the villages and settlements of Dziaduszyn, Gębałka, Harsz, Jakunówko, Kolonia Pozezdrze, Krzywińskie, Kuty, Nowy Harsz, Okowizna, Pieczarki, Piłaki Wielkie, Pozezdrze, Przerwanki, Przytuły, Radziszewo, Sapieniec, Stręgielek and Wyłudy.

== Neighbouring gminas ==
Gmina Pozezdrze is bordered by the gminas of Banie Mazurskie, Budry, Giżycko, Kruklanki and Węgorzewo.
