= Jakunówko =

- Village
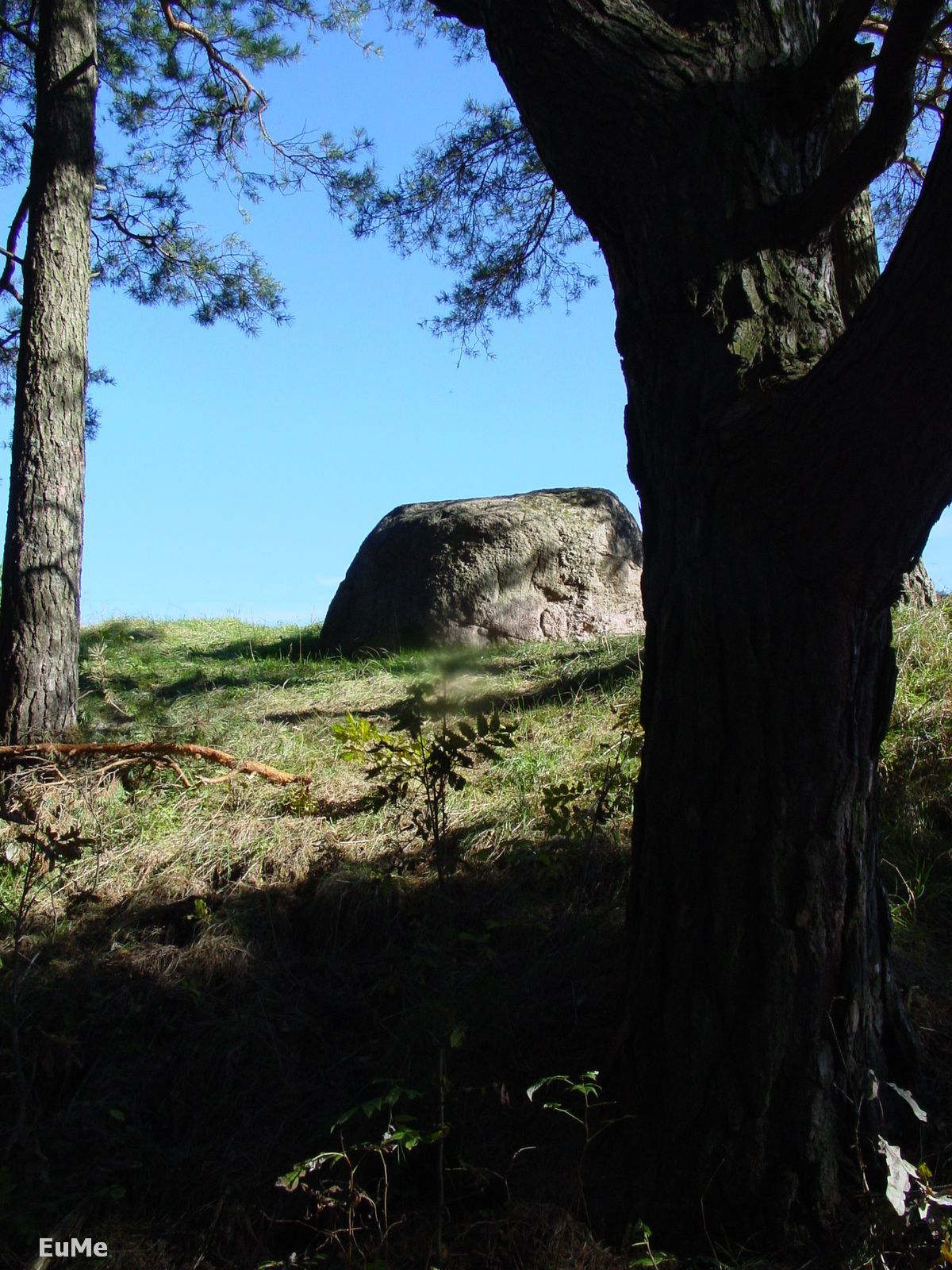

- Location within Poland
- Coordinates: 54°10′N 21°59′E
- Country: Poland
- Voivodeship: Warmian-Masurian
- County: Węgorzewo
- Gmina: Pozezdrze
- Founded: 1565
- Founder: Mikołaj Kijalnik and Grzegorz Kijalnik

Population (approx.)
  - Total: 280
- Time zone: UTC+1 (CET)
  - Summer (DST): UTC+2 (CEST)
- Vehicle registration: NWE

Jakunówko [jakuˈnufkɔ] is a village in the administrative district of Gmina Pozezdrze, within Węgorzewo County, Warmian-Masurian Voivodeship, in north-eastern Poland.

In 1565 Mikołaj Kijalnik and Grzegorz Kijalnik from Jakunowo were granted 60 włókas of land to establish the village, initially under the name Wilamowa.
