= Aleksandrowo, Siemiatycze County =

Aleksandrowo
- Village
- Location within Poland
- Coordinates: 52°34′N 22°48′E
- Country: Poland
- Voivodeship: Podlaskie
- County: Siemiatycze
- Gmina: Grodzisk

Aleksandrowo [alɛksanˈdrɔvɔ] is a village in the administrative district of Gmina Grodzisk, within Siemiatycze County, Podlaskie Voivodeship, in north-eastern Poland.
