= Krynki-Miklasy =

- Village
- Location within Poland
- Coordinates: 52°37′9″N 22°39′6″E
- Country: Poland
- Voivodeship: Podlaskie
- County: Siemiatycze
- Gmina: Grodzisk

Krynki-Miklasy [ˈkrɨnki miˈklasɨ] is a village in the administrative district of Gmina Grodzisk, within Siemiatycze County, Podlaskie Voivodeship, in north-eastern Poland.
