= Niewiarowo-Przybki =

- Village
- Location within Poland
- Coordinates: 52°33′23″N 22°44′09″E
- Country: Poland
- Voivodeship: Podlaskie
- County: Siemiatycze
- Gmina: Grodzisk

Niewiarowo-Przybki [ɲɛvjaˈrɔvɔ ˈpʂɨpki] is a village in the administrative district of Gmina Grodzisk, within Siemiatycze County, Podlaskie Voivodeship, in north-eastern Poland.
