= Pozezdrze =

- Village
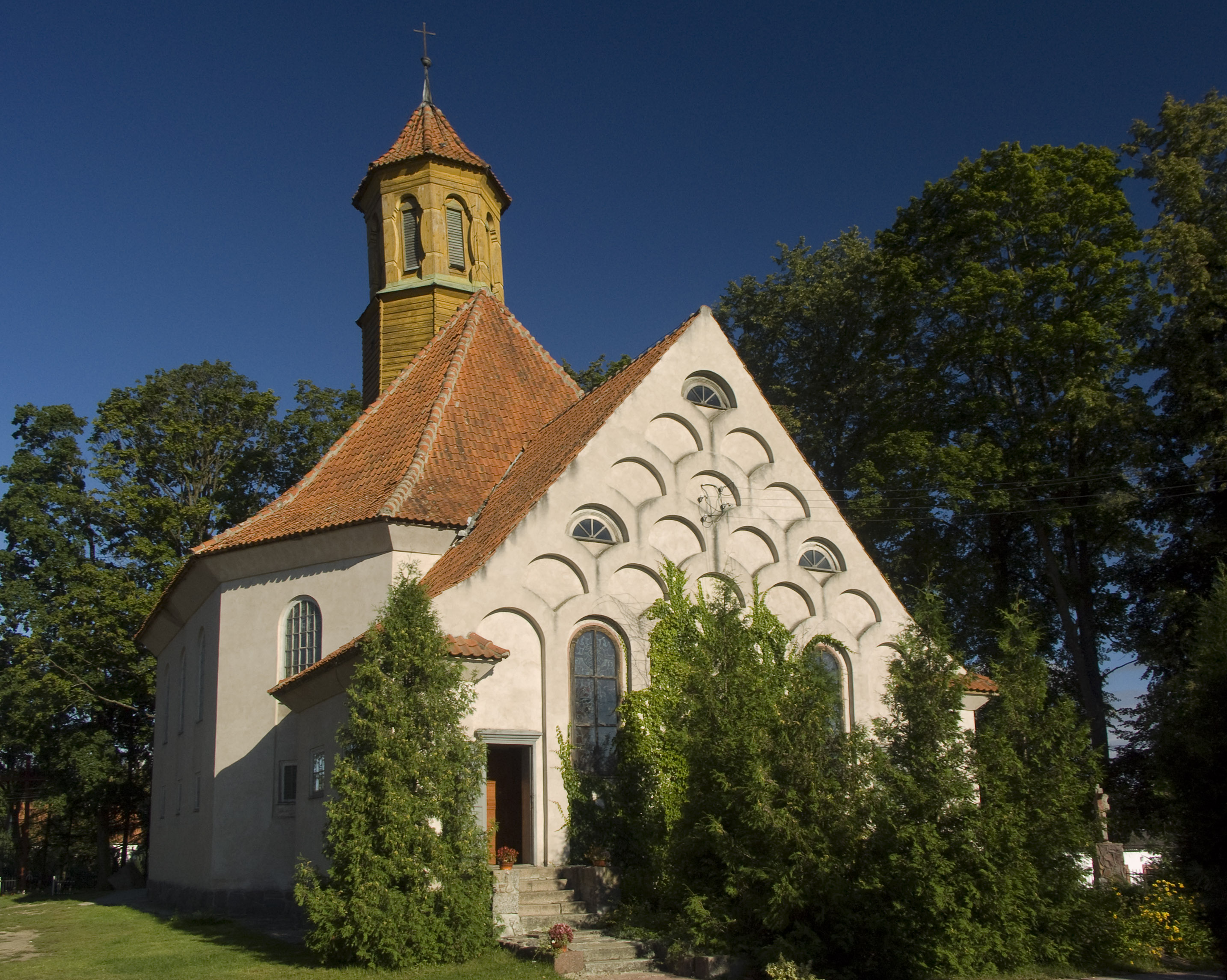
- Church of Saint Stanisław Kostka

- Location within Poland
- Coordinates: 54°8′31″N 21°51′31″E
- Country: Poland
- Voivodeship: Warmian-Masurian
- County: Węgorzewo
- Gmina: Pozezdrze

Population
  - Total: 1,320

Pozezdrze [pɔˈzɛzdʐɛ] (German: Possessern) is a village in Węgorzewo County, Warmian-Masurian Voivodeship, in northern Poland. It is the seat of the gmina (administrative district) called Gmina Pozezdrze.

The village has a population of 1,320.
