= Czaje =

- Village
- Location within Poland
- Coordinates: 52°39′45″N 22°42′21″E
- Country: Poland
- Voivodeship: Podlaskie
- County: Siemiatycze
- Gmina: Grodzisk
- Time zone: UTC+1 (CET)
  - Summer (DST): UTC+2 (CEST)

Czaje [ˈt͡ʂajɛ] is a village in the administrative district of Gmina Grodzisk, within Siemiatycze County, Podlaskie Voivodeship, in eastern Poland.

== History ==
Four Polish citizens were murdered by Nazi Germany in the village during World War II.
