= Kolonia Pozezdrze =

- Village
- Location within Poland
- Coordinates: 54°7′6″N 21°50′58″E
- Country: Poland
- Voivodeship: Warmian-Masurian
- County: Węgorzewo
- Gmina: Pozezdrze

Kolonia Pozezdrze [kɔˈlɔɲa pɔˈzɛzdʐɛ] (German: Possessern Kolonie) is a village in the administrative district of Gmina Pozezdrze, within Węgorzewo County, Warmian-Masurian Voivodeship, in northern Poland.
