= Krzywińskie, Węgorzewo County =

Krzywińskie
- Village
- Location within Poland
- Coordinates: 54°13′N 21°52′E
- Country: Poland
- Voivodeship: Warmian-Masurian
- County: Węgorzewo
- Gmina: Pozezdrze
- Founded: 1557
- Founder: Marcin Krzywiński
- Population (2011): 307
- Time zone: UTC+1 (CET)
  - Summer (DST): UTC+2 (CEST)
- Vehicle registration: NWE

Krzywińskie [kʂɨˈviɲskʲɛ] is a village in the administrative district of Gmina Pozezdrze, within Węgorzewo County, Warmian-Masurian Voivodeship, in northern Poland. It is located in the historic region of Masuria.

== History ==
The origins of the village date back to 1557, when Marcin Krzywiński bought 4 włókas of land to establish a village. The village historically had two equivalent Polish names, Krzywińskie and Krzywinki, both derived from the last name of its founder. It was settled by Poles. Under Nazi Germany, the village was renamed Sonnheim to erase traces of Polish origin. Following World War II, in 1945, the village became again part of Poland and its historic Polish name was restored.
