= Przytuły, Węgorzewo County =

Przytuły
- Village
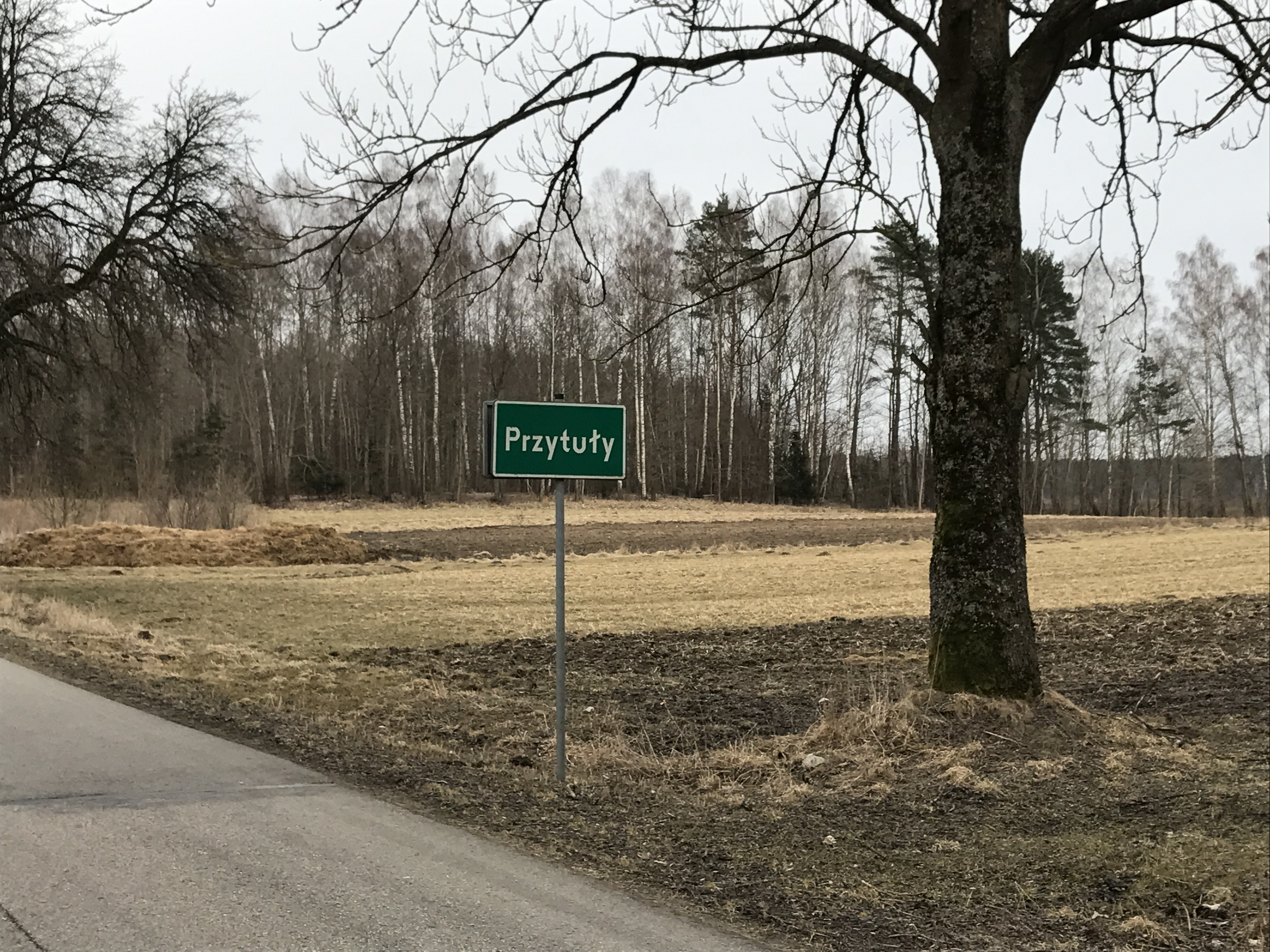

- Location within Poland
- Coordinates: 54°9′46″N 21°54′36″E
- Country: Poland
- Voivodeship: Warmian-Masurian
- County: Węgorzewo
- Gmina: Pozezdrze
- Founded: 1569
- Time zone: UTC+1 (CET)
  - Summer (DST): UTC+2 (CEST)
- Vehicle registration: NWE

Przytuły [pʂɨˈtuwɨ] is a village in the administrative district of Gmina Pozezdrze, within Węgorzewo County, Warmian-Masurian Voivodeship, in north-eastern Poland. It is located in Masuria.

Przytuły was founded by Polish people in 1569.
