= Niewiarowo-Sochy =

- Village
- Location within Poland
- Coordinates: 52°32′59″N 22°44′46″E
- Country: Poland
- Voivodeship: Podlaskie
- County: Siemiatycze
- Gmina: Grodzisk
- Time zone: UTC+1 (CET)
  - Summer (DST): UTC+2 (CEST)

Niewiarowo-Sochy [ɲɛvjaˈrɔvɔ ˈsɔxɨ] is a village in the administrative district of Gmina Grodzisk, within Siemiatycze County, Podlaskie Voivodeship, in eastern Poland.

== History ==
Three Polish citizens were murdered by Nazi Germany in the village during World War II.
