= Gębałka =

- Village
- Location within Poland
- Coordinates: 54°12′N 21°56′E
- Country: Poland
- Voivodeship: Warmian-Masurian
- County: Węgorzewo
- Gmina: Pozezdrze
- Founded: 1562
- Founder: Jan Sikora
- Vehicle registration: NWE

Gębałka [ɡɛmˈbau̯ka] is a village in the administrative district of Gmina Pozezdrze, within Węgorzewo County, Warmian-Masurian Voivodeship, in northern Poland. It is located in Masuria.

The village was founded in 1562 by Jan Sikora. It was historically known in Polish as Gębałka and Gębałówka.
