= Krynki-Sobole =

- Village
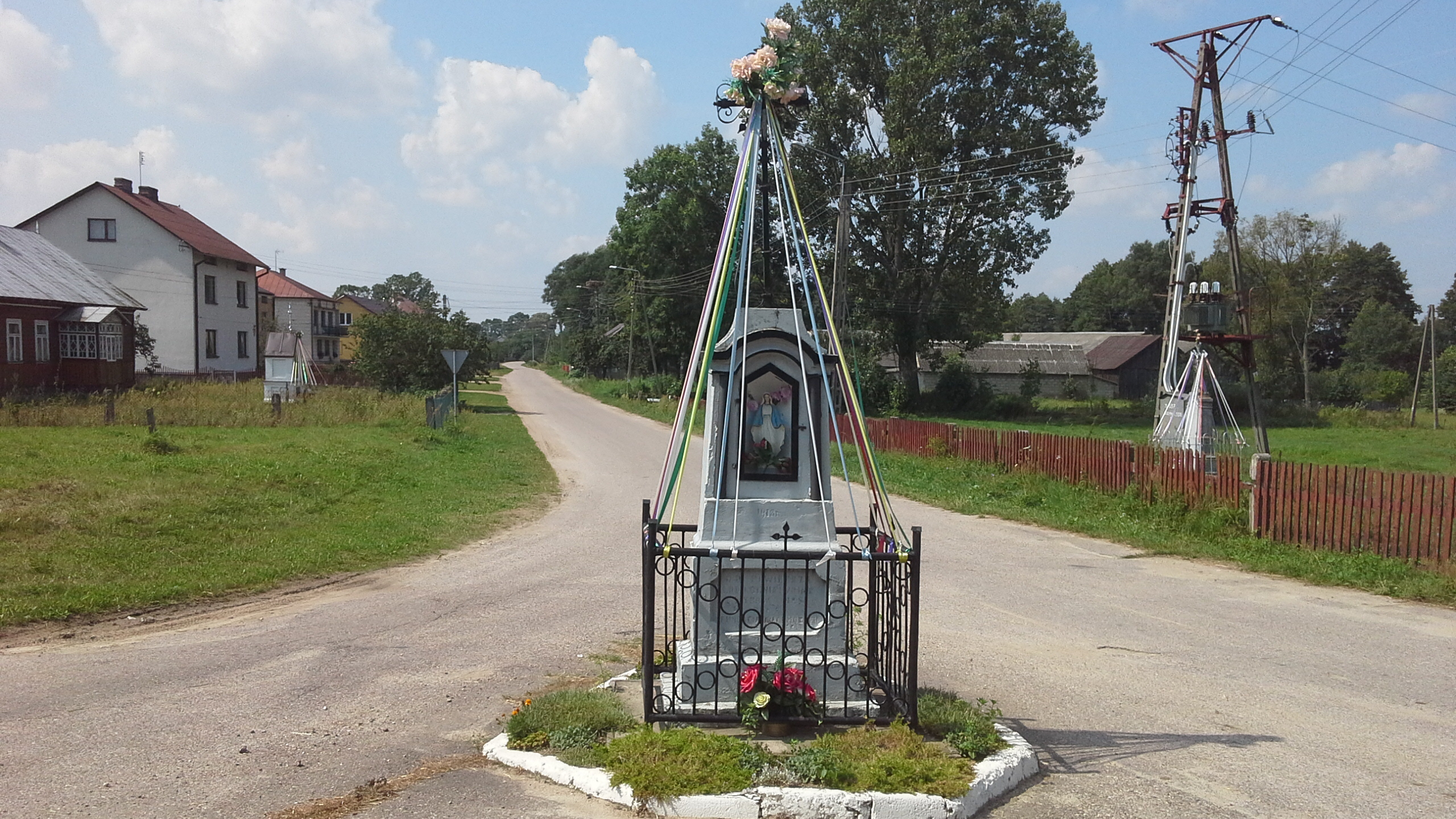

- Location within Poland
- Coordinates: 52°32′08″N 22°46′50″E
- Country: Poland
- Voivodeship: Podlaskie
- County: Siemiatycze
- Gmina: Grodzisk

Krynki-Sobole [ˈkrɨnki sɔˈbɔlɛ] is a village in the administrative district of Gmina Grodzisk, within Siemiatycze County, Podlaskie Voivodeship, in north-eastern Poland.

According to the 1921 census, the village was inhabited by 224 people, among whom 198 were Roman Catholic, 24 Orthodox, and 2 Mosaic. At the same time, 212 inhabitants declared Polish nationality, 10 Belarusian and 2 Jewish. There were 52 residential buildings in the village.
