= Kamianki, Siemiatycze County =

Kamianki
- Village
- Location within Poland
- Coordinates: 52°32′N 22°43′E
- Country: Poland
- Voivodeship: Podlaskie
- County: Siemiatycze
- Gmina: Grodzisk

Kamianki [kaˈmjanki] is a village in the administrative district of Gmina Grodzisk, within Siemiatycze County, Podlaskie Voivodeship, in north-eastern Poland.
