= Przerwanki =

- Village
- Location within Poland
- Coordinates: 54°8′N 21°56′E
- Country: Poland
- Voivodeship: Warmian-Masurian
- County: Węgorzewo
- Gmina: Pozezdrze

Przerwanki [pʂɛrˈvanki] (German: Wiesental) is a village in the administrative district of Gmina Pozezdrze, within Węgorzewo County, Warmian-Masurian Voivodeship, in northern Poland.
