= Krynki Borowe =

- Village
- Location within Poland
- Coordinates: 52°36′10″N 22°41′32″E
- Country: Poland
- Voivodeship: Podlaskie
- County: Siemiatycze
- Gmina: Grodzisk
- Population: 30

Krynki Borowe [ˈkrɨnki bɔˈrɔvɛ] is a village in Gmina Grodzisk, Siemiatycze County, Podlaskie Voivodeship, Poland.

According to the 1921 census, the village was inhabited by 73 people, among whom 68 were Roman Catholic and 5 Mosaic. At the same time, 68 inhabitants declared Polish nationality, 5 Jewish. There were 14 residential buildings in the village.
