= Żery-Czubiki =

- Village
- Location within Poland
- Coordinates: 52°35′50″N 22°39′58″E
- Country: Poland
- Voivodeship: Podlaskie
- County: Siemiatycze
- Gmina: Grodzisk

Żery-Czubiki [ˈʐɛrɨ t͡ʂuˈbiki] is a village in the administrative district of Gmina Grodzisk, within Siemiatycze County, Podlaskie Voivodeship, in north-eastern Poland.

According to the 1921 census, the village was inhabited by 91 people, among whom 75 were Roman Catholic, 5 Orthodox, and 11 Mosaic. At the same time, all inhabitants declared Polish nationality. There were 18 residential buildings in the village.
