= Porzeziny-Giętki =

- Village
- Location within Poland
- Coordinates: 52°36′38″N 22°43′47″E
- Country: Poland
- Voivodeship: Podlaskie
- County: Siemiatycze
- Gmina: Grodzisk
- Population: 20

Porzeziny-Giętki [pɔʐɛˈʑinɨ ˈɡʲɛntki] is a village in the administrative district of Gmina Grodzisk, within Siemiatycze County, Podlaskie Voivodeship, in north-eastern Poland.
