= Okowizna =

- Settlement
- Location within Poland
- Coordinates: 54°9′N 21°47′E
- Country: Poland
- Voivodeship: Warmian-Masurian
- County: Węgorzewo
- Gmina: Pozezdrze

Okowizna [ɔkɔˈvizna] (German: Numeiten) is a settlement in the administrative district of Gmina Pozezdrze, within Węgorzewo County, Warmian-Masurian Voivodeship, in northern Poland.
