= Targowisk =

- Settlement
- Location within Poland
- Coordinates: 52°35′34″N 22°49′56″E
- Country: Poland
- Voivodeship: Podlaskie
- County: Siemiatycze
- Gmina: Grodzisk

Targowisk [tarˈɡɔvisk] is a settlement in the administrative district of Gmina Grodzisk, within Siemiatycze County, Podlaskie Voivodeship, in north-eastern Poland.
