= Dołubowo-Wyręby =

- Village
- Location within Poland
- Coordinates: 52°37′03″N 22°50′13″E
- Country: Poland
- Voivodeship: Podlaskie
- County: Siemiatycze
- Gmina: Grodzisk

Dołubowo-Wyręby [dɔwuˈbɔvɔ vɨˈrɛmbɨ] is a village in the administrative district of Gmina Grodzisk, within Siemiatycze County, Podlaskie Voivodeship, in north-eastern Poland.
