= Rybałty =

- Village
- Location within Poland
- Coordinates: 52°33′N 22°46′E
- Country: Poland
- Voivodeship: Podlaskie
- County: Siemiatycze
- Gmina: Grodzisk

Rybałty [rɨˈbau̯tɨ] is a village in the administrative district of Gmina Grodzisk, within Siemiatycze County, Podlaskie Voivodeship, in north-eastern Poland. Population: about 36 people.

Rybałty is a small rural village in Poland with farmland, a few houses, and a quiet natural setting. It has no major tourist attractions, but it reflects the traditional rural life of the Podlaskie region, known for its green landscapes and peaceful environment.
