= Mierzynówka =

- Village
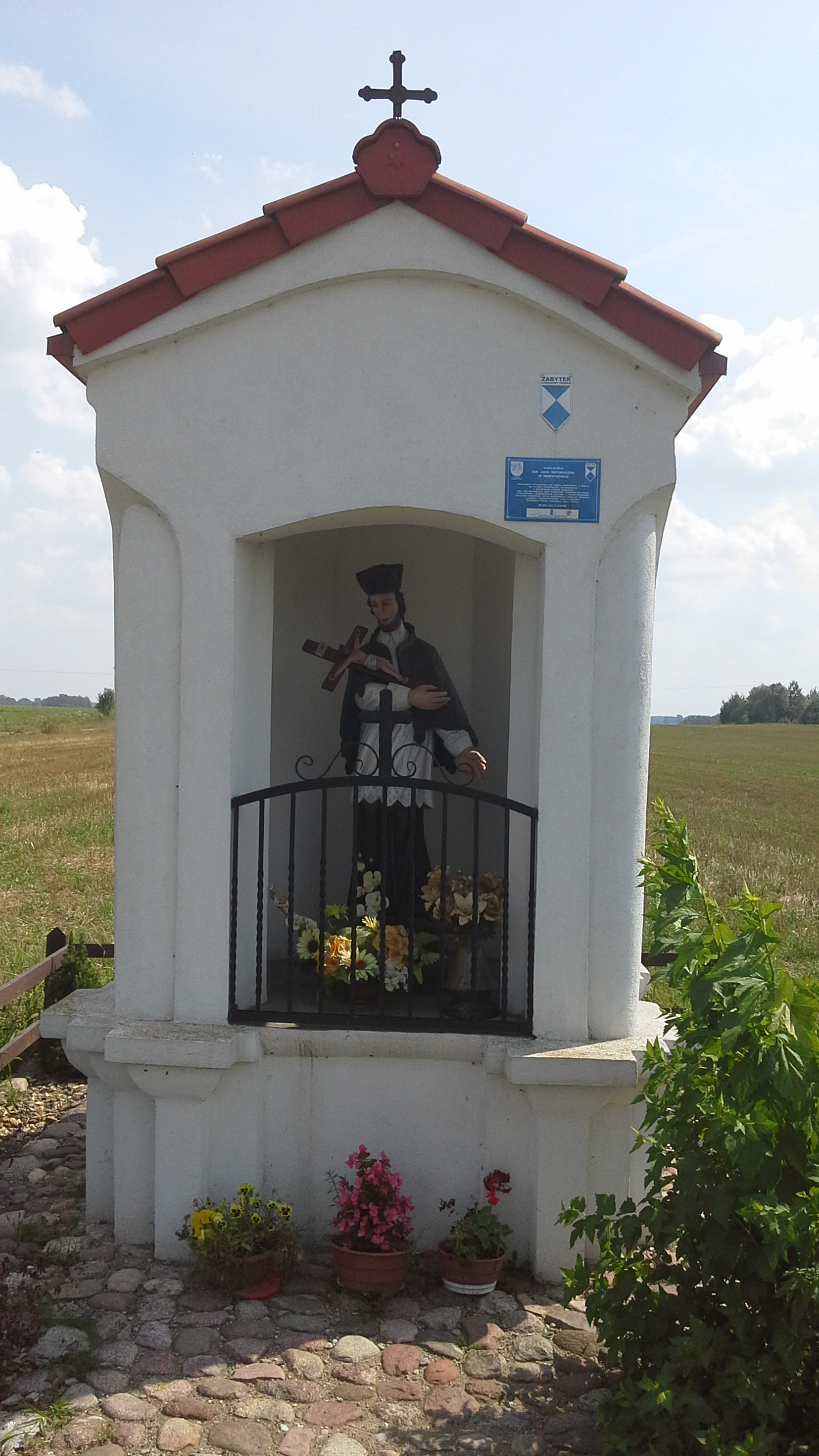

- Location within Poland
- Coordinates: 52°35′18″N 22°45′32″E
- Country: Poland
- Voivodeship: Podlaskie
- County: Siemiatycze
- Gmina: Grodzisk

Mierzynówka [mjɛʐɨˈnufka] is a village in the administrative district of Gmina Grodzisk, within Siemiatycze County, Podlaskie Voivodeship, in north-eastern Poland.
