= Sapieniec, Gmina Pozezdrze =

Sapieniec
- Village
- Location within Poland
- Coordinates: 54°09′18″N 21°52′59″E
- Country: Poland
- Voivodeship: Warmian-Masurian
- County: Węgorzewo
- Gmina: Pozezdrze

Sapieniec [saˈpjɛɲɛt͡s] (German: Karlsberg) is a village in the administrative district of Gmina Pozezdrze, in Węgorzewo County, Warmian-Masurian Voivodeship, northern Poland.
