= Radziszewo, Warmian-Masurian Voivodeship =

Radziszewo
- Village
- Location within Poland
- Coordinates: 54°12′49″N 21°53′2″E
- Country: Poland
- Voivodeship: Warmian-Masurian
- County: Węgorzewo
- Gmina: Pozezdrze
- Population: 210

Radziszewo [rad͡ʑiˈʂɛvɔ] (German: Karlsfelde) is a village in the administrative district of Gmina Pozezdrze, within the Węgorzewo County in Warmian-Masurian Voivodeship (province) situated in northern Poland.

The village has a population of 210.
