= Małyszczyn =

- Village
- Location within Poland
- Coordinates: 52°40′N 22°43′E
- Country: Poland
- Voivodeship: Podlaskie
- County: Siemiatycze
- Gmina: Grodzisk
- Postal code: 17-315
- Vehicle registration: BSI

Małyszczyn [maˈwɨʂt͡ʂɨn] is a village in the administrative district of Gmina Grodzisk, within Siemiatycze County, Podlaskie Voivodeship, in north-eastern Poland.

Five Polish citizens were murdered by Nazi Germany in the village during World War II.
