= Krynki-Białokunki =

Village in Gmina Grodzisk, Poland

- Village
- Location within Poland
- Coordinates: 52°36′32″N 22°40′12″E
- Country: Poland
- Voivodeship: Podlaskie
- County: Siemiatycze
- Gmina: Grodzisk

Krynki-Białokunki [ˈkrɨnki bjawɔˈkunki] is a village in the administrative district of Gmina Grodzisk, within Siemiatycze County, Podlaskie Voivodeship, in north-eastern Poland.
