= Gmina Grodzisk =

Gmina Grodzisk Grodzisk Commune
- Gmina
- Interactive map of Gmina Grodzisk
- Coordinates (Grodzisk): 52°35′2″N 22°44′17″E
- Country: Poland
- Voivodeship: Podlaskie
- County: Siemiatycze
- Seat: Grodzisk

Area
  - Total: 203.21 km^{2} (78.46 sq mi)

Population (2006)
  - Total: 4,596
  - Density: 22.62/km^{2} (58.58/sq mi)

Gmina Grodzisk is a rural gmina (administrative district) in Siemiatycze County, Podlaskie Voivodeship, in north-eastern Poland. Its seat is the village of Grodzisk, which lies approximately 20 kilometres (12 mi) north-west of Siemiatycze and 66 km (41 mi) south-west of the regional capital Białystok.

The gmina covers an area of 203.21 square kilometres (78.5 sq mi), and as of 2006 its total population is 4,596.

== Villages ==
Gmina Grodzisk contains the villages and settlements of:

- Aleksandrowo
- Biszewo
- Bogusze-Litewka
- Czaje
- Czarna Cerkiewna
- Czarna Średnia
- Czarna Wielka
- Dobrogoszcz
- Dołubowo-Wyręby
- Drochlin
- Grodzisk
- Jaszczołty
- Kamianki
- Koryciny
- Kosianka Leśna
- Kosianka-Boruty
- Kosianka-Trojanówka
- Krakówki-Dąbki
- Krakówki-Włodki
- Krakówki-Zdzichy
- Krynki Borowe
- Krynki-Białokunki
- Krynki-Jarki
- Krynki-Miklasy
- Krynki-Sobole
- Lubowicze
- Makarki
- Małyszczyn
- Mierzynówka
- Morze
- Niewiarowo-Przybki
- Niewiarowo-Sochy
- Nowe Sypnie
- Porzeziny-Giętki
- Porzeziny-Mendle
- Rybałty
- Siemiony
- Stadniki
- Stara Kosianka
- Stare Bogusze
- Stare Sypnie
- Targowisk
- Żale
- Żery Bystre
- Żery-Czubiki and Żery-Pilaki

== Neighbouring gminas ==
Gmina Grodzisk is bordered by the gminas of Brańsk, Ciechanowiec, Drohiczyn, Dziadkowice, Perlejewo, Rudka and Siemiatycze.
