= Krakówki-Dąbki =

- Village
- Location within Poland
- Coordinates: 52°32′36″N 22°38′50″E
- Country: Poland
- Voivodeship: Podlaskie
- County: Siemiatycze
- Gmina: Grodzisk
- Population: 20

Krakówki-Dąbki [kraˈkufki ˈdɔmpki] is a village in the administrative district of Gmina Grodzisk, within Siemiatycze County, Podlaskie Voivodeship, in north-eastern Poland.
