= Krynki-Jarki =

- Village
- Location within Poland
- Coordinates: 52°37′11″N 22°39′11″E
- Country: Poland
- Voivodeship: Podlaskie
- County: Siemiatycze
- Gmina: Grodzisk

Krynki-Jarki [ˈkrɨnki ˈjarki] is a village in the administrative district of Gmina Grodzisk, within Siemiatycze County, Podlaskie Voivodeship, in north-eastern Poland.
