= Lubowicze =

- Village
- Location within Poland
- Coordinates: 52°31′43″N 22°43′59″E
- Country: Poland
- Voivodeship: Podlaskie
- County: Siemiatycze
- Gmina: Grodzisk

Lubowicze [lubɔˈvit͡ʂɛ] is a village in the administrative district of Gmina Grodzisk, within Siemiatycze County, Podlaskie Voivodeship, in north-eastern Poland.
