= Stręgielek =

- Village
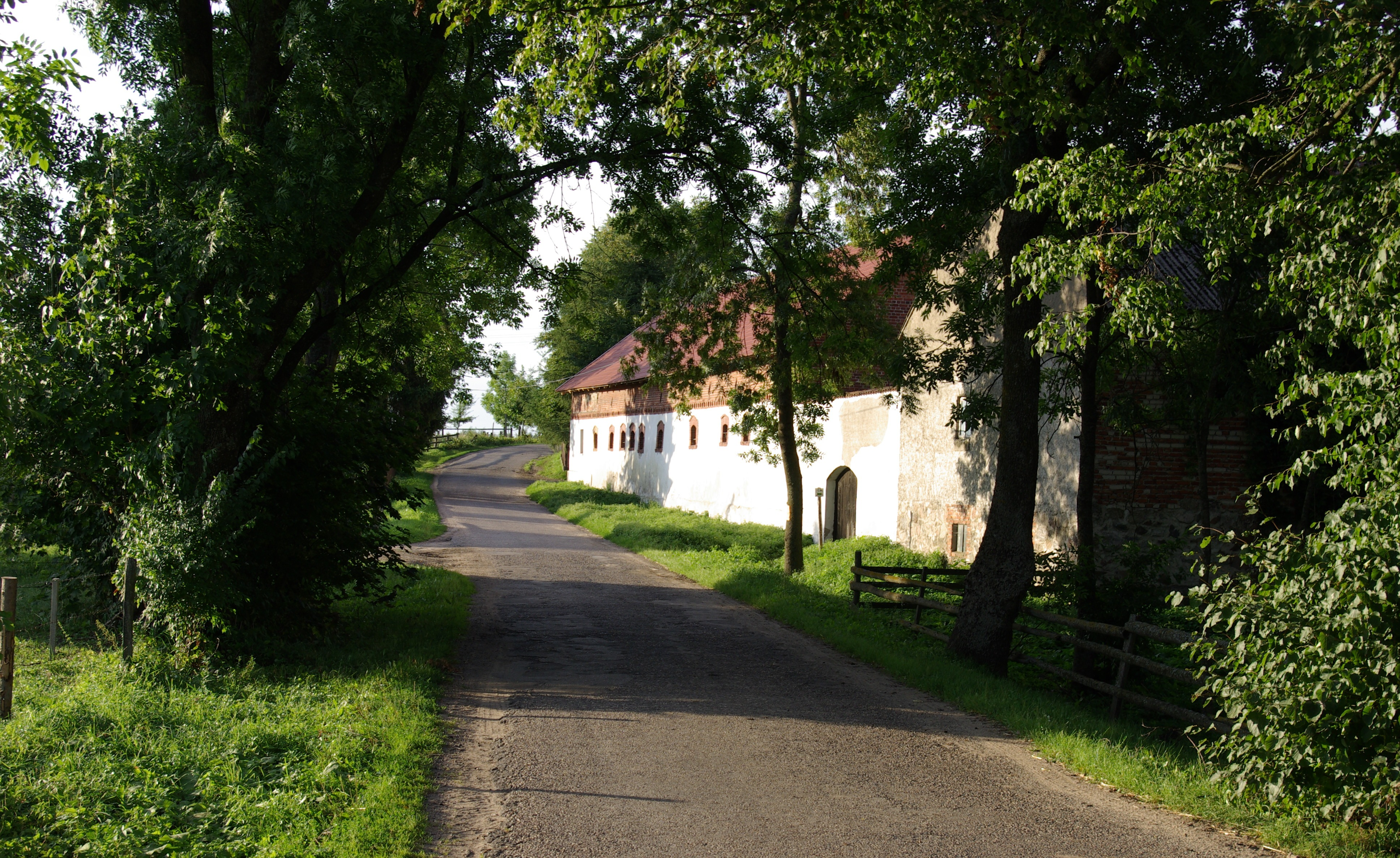

- Location within Poland
- Coordinates: 54°11′N 21°52′E
- Country: Poland
- Voivodeship: Warmian-Masurian
- County: Węgorzewo
- Gmina: Pozezdrze
- Founded: 1550
- Time zone: UTC+1 (CET)
  - Summer (DST): UTC+2 (CEST)
- Vehicle registration: NWE

Stręgielek [strɛnˈɡʲɛlɛk] is a village in the administrative district of Gmina Pozezdrze, within Węgorzewo County, Warmian-Masurian Voivodeship, in northern Poland.

Stręgielek was established in 1550 by Stańko from Bartosze, who bought land to establish the village. The Łoś Polish noble family lived in the village.
