= Wyłudy, Warmian-Masurian Voivodeship =

Wyłudy
- Village
- Location within Poland
- Coordinates: 54°7′N 21°54′E
- Country: Poland
- Voivodeship: Warmian-Masurian
- County: Węgorzewo
- Gmina: Pozezdrze
- Founded: 1544
- Founder: Andrzej Wyłudzki and Marcin Wyłudzki
- Time zone: UTC+1 (CET)
  - Summer (DST): UTC+2 (CEST)
- Vehicle registration: NWE

Wyłudy [vɨˈwudɨ] (German: Willudden, from 1938-45 Andreastal) is a village in the administrative district of Gmina Pozezdrze, within Węgorzewo County, Warmian-Masurian Voivodeship, in north-eastern Poland.

Wyłudy was founded in 1544 by brother Andrzej and Marcin Wyłudzki, who bought land to establish the village.
