= Szadzenie =

Phonological phenomena in Polish language

Szadzenie (Polish: [ʂaˈd͡zɛɲɛ]) is a regional phonological feature of the Polish language. It consists in replacement or merger of dental affricates /t͡s/, /d͡z/ ⟨c, dz⟩ and dental fricatives /s/, /z/ ⟨s, z⟩ into their retroflex counterparts i.e. retroflex affricates /t͡ʂ/, /d͡ʐ/ ⟨cz, dż⟩ and retroflex fricatives /ʂ/, /ʐ/ ⟨sz, ż/rz⟩, respectively. Szadzenie is caused by the hypercorrect avoidance of mazurzenie (mazuration) which is phonetically marked as rural and incorrect. This phenomenon is common in areas which border mazurating dialects, for instance the Suwałki Region.

Examples of attested words with szadzenie in Polish dialects noted in the Atlas of Polish Dialects (Atlas Gwar Polskich): proszo instead of proso ("millet, Panicum"), bydlęczy instead of bydlęcy ("bovine"), szmalec instead of smalec ("lard").

The word szadzenie is derived from Polish word sadzić, colloquially meaning "to bother", pronounced in the relevant dialects as [ˈʂad͡ʑit͡ɕ] instead of [ˈsad͡ʑit͡ɕ].

== See also ==
- Polish phonology
- Mazurzenie
