= Kosianka-Boruty =

- Village
- Location within Poland
- Coordinates: 52°35′29″N 22°41′27″E
- Country: Poland
- Voivodeship: Podlaskie
- County: Siemiatycze
- Gmina: Grodzisk
- Population: 50

Kosianka-Boruty [kɔˈɕanka bɔˈrutɨ] is a village in the administrative district of Gmina Grodzisk, within Siemiatycze County, Podlaskie Voivodeship, in north-eastern Poland.
