= Celestyn Myślenta =

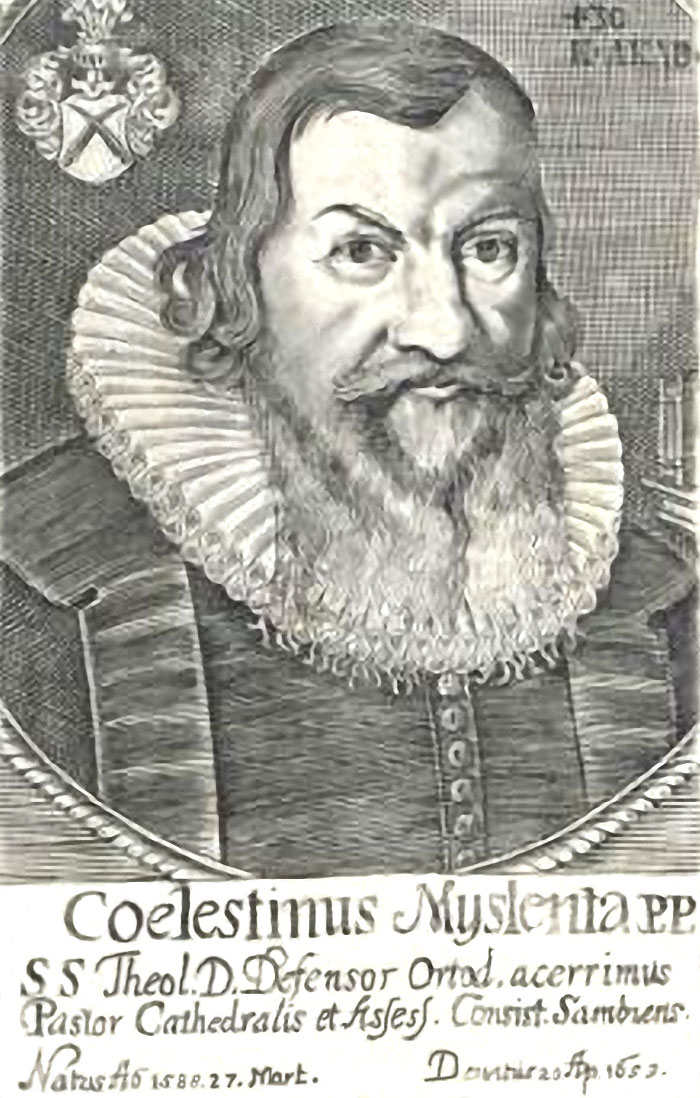

Celestyn Myślenta (also Mislenski; 27 March 1588 in Kuty (Kutten), Ducal Prussia – 20 April 1653 in Königsberg (Królewiec)) was a Polish Lutheran theologian and rector of the University of Königsberg. Celestyn was the son of Mateusz Myślenta (also Myslonius) and Eufroza née Wiercinska. His father was once employed by Duke Radziwill and belonged to the Polish nobility. As a stipendiary of the Duke of Prussia, he studied at University Königsberg, then became Lutheran pastor in Kuty from 1581-1599.

Celestyn studied Latin in Wegorzewo (Angerburg), Frydląd (Friedland in Prussia) and at the University of Königsberg. In 1609, he relocated to Wittenberg to study Protestant theology under Leonhard Hutter, Friedrich Balduin and Friedrich Meisner. In 1615, he spent some months in Leipzig and later moved to Gießen to study at the local university, where his disputation in Hebrew drew much attention. His knowledge of oriental languages was gained during his stay in Frankfurt under Christoph Helvig and Johannes Gisenius and in conversations with the Jews of Frankfurt, who introduced him to rabbinical literature. He continued his studies in Gießen and received his doctorate in 1619. During his educational journey, he also visited the universities of Jena, Tübingen, Leiden, and Basel, where he broadened his knowledge of oriental languages under Johannes Buxtorf and Thomas van Erpe.

In 1619, he was appointed by Prussian duke John Sigismund to the University of Königsberg as a professor extraordinarius of theology, and in 1621, as professor ordinarius of Hebrew. He served as an assessor for the Consistory of Sambia from 1622, the pastor of the Königsberg Cathedral beginning in 1626, and the superintendent for religious education in the Sambia region from 1640. In 1637 or 1638, he married Regina Winter von Sternenfeld, widow of Henning Wegner, a former jurist at the university.

As a superintendent, he insisted on introducing Polish as the language of instruction, in addition to Latin.
