= Pieczarki, Węgorzewo County =

Pieczarki
- Village
- Location within Poland
- Coordinates: 54°6′N 21°48′E
- Country: Poland
- Voivodeship: Warmian-Masurian
- County: Węgorzewo
- Gmina: Pozezdrze
- Elevation: 120 m (390 ft)
- Population: 164
- Website: http://www.pozezdrze.pl/prezentacje.php

Pieczarki [pjɛˈt͡ʂarki] (German: Bergensee) is a village in the administrative district of Gmina Pozezdrze, within Węgorzewo County, Warmian-Masurian Voivodeship, in northern Poland.

The village has a population of 164.
