= Kosianka Stara =

- Village
- Location within Poland
- Coordinates: 52°34′40″N 22°41′35″E
- Country: Poland
- Voivodeship: Podlaskie
- County: Siemiatycze
- Gmina: Grodzisk
- Population: 60

Kosianka Stara [kɔˈɕaŋka ˈstara] is a village in the administrative district of Gmina Grodzisk, within Siemiatycze County, Podlaskie Voivodeship, in north-eastern Poland.
