= Harsz =

- Village
- Location within Poland
- Coordinates: 54°8′39″N 21°47′18″E
- Country: Poland
- Voivodeship: Warmian-Masurian
- County: Węgorzewo
- Gmina: Pozezdrze
- Population: 580

Harsz [xarʂ] (German: Haarschen) is a village in the administrative district of Gmina Pozezdrze, within Węgorzewo County, Warmian-Masurian Voivodeship, in northern Poland.

The village has a population of 580.
