= Morze, Siemiatycze County =

Morze
- Village
- Location within Poland
- Coordinates: 52°31′N 22°44′E
- Country: Poland
- Voivodeship: Podlaskie
- County: Siemiatycze
- Gmina: Grodzisk

Morze [ˈmɔʐɛ] is a village in the administrative district of Gmina Grodzisk, within Siemiatycze County, Podlaskie Voivodeship, in north-eastern Poland.
