= Krakówki-Włodki =

- Village
- Location within Poland
- Coordinates: 52°32′45″N 22°39′26″E
- Country: Poland
- Voivodeship: Podlaskie
- County: Siemiatycze
- Gmina: Grodzisk
- Population: 20

Krakówki-Włodki [kraˈkufki ˈvwɔtki] is a village in the administrative district of Gmina Grodzisk, within Siemiatycze County, Podlaskie Voivodeship, in north-eastern Poland.
