= Sabesdiker losn =

Linguistic merger of certain consonants in a dialect of Yiddish

Der sabesdiker-losn (Yiddish: דער סאַבעסדיקער לשון (לאָסן)) is a dialectal feature characteristic of the Northeastern dialect of the Yiddish language (NEY, Litvisher-vaysrusisher dialekt, צפֿון ייִדיש Tsofn-yidish), which is the replacement, or merger of the "hushing" (post-alveolar) consonants "ch", "sh" (IPA: /tʃ/, /ʃ/), with the "hissing" (alveolar) ones, "ts", "s" (IPA: /ts/, /s/). The name of the term is a shibboleth: the phrase "דאָס שבתֿדיקע לשון" dos shabesdike loshn (in standard Yiddish) means 'Sabbath speech', hinting at the perception that this feature is substandard. In addition to the shibboleth, the use of the masculine article der indicates NEY's tendency to use either the masculine or the feminine gender for nouns where Standard Yiddish uses the neuter.

It is similar to the dialectical feature of Polish called mazurzenie, and there has been a hypothesis on the influence of mazurzenie on the development of sabesdiker losn.
