= Drochlin, Podlaskie Voivodeship =

Drochlin
- Village
- Location within Poland
- Coordinates: 52°34′01″N 22°42′07″E
- Country: Poland
- Voivodeship: Podlaskie
- County: Siemiatycze
- Gmina: Grodzisk

Drochlin [ˈdrɔxlin] is a village in the administrative district of Gmina Grodzisk, within Siemiatycze County, Podlaskie Voivodeship, in north-eastern Poland.

== Monuments ==
- Greek Catholic wayside shrine from 1881
