= Kuty, Warmian-Masurian Voivodeship =

Village in Poland

Kuty
- Village
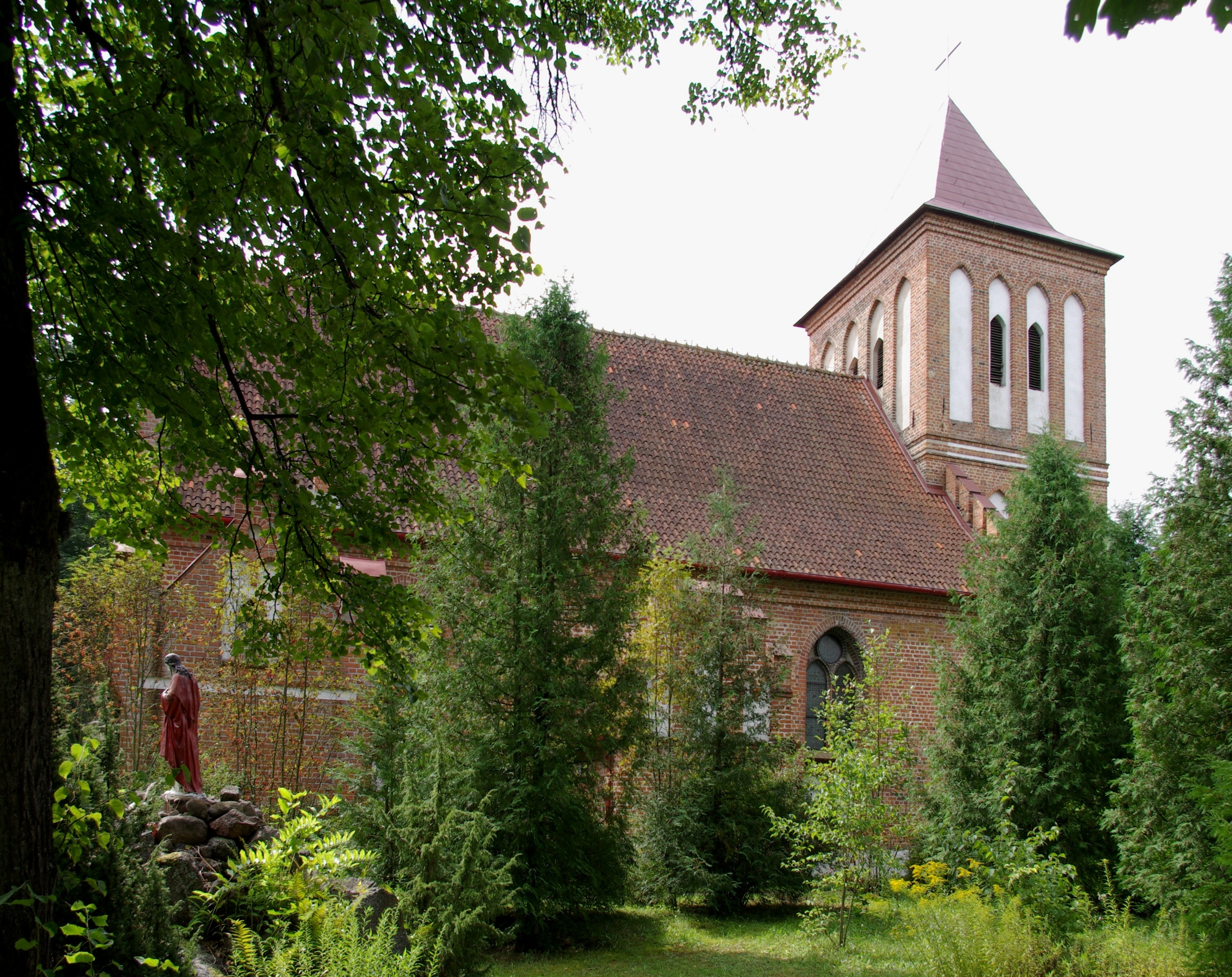
- Saint Maximilian Kolbe church in Kuty

- Location within Poland
- Coordinates: 54°10′18″N 21°56′15″E
- Country: Poland
- Voivodeship: Warmian-Masurian
- County: Węgorzewo
- Gmina: Pozezdrze
- Founded: 1552
- Time zone: UTC+1 (CET)
  - Summer (DST): UTC+2 (CEST)
- Vehicle registration: NWE

Kuty [ˈkutɨ] (German: Kutten) is a village in the administrative district of Gmina Pozezdrze, within Węgorzewo County, Warmian-Masurian Voivodeship, in northern Poland. It is located on the northern and eastern shore of Lake Czarna Kuta in the region of Masuria.

== History ==
Kuty was founded by Polish people in 1552. The local landmark Gothic Saint Maximilian Kolbe church was built in the late 16th century. In 1710, the village was hit by an epidemic, commemorated by a painting in the church by order of the local pastor Paweł Drygalski. Under Nazi Germany, a labour camp of the Reich Labour Service was operated in the village. After Germany's defeat in World War II, in 1945, the village became again part of Poland.

== Notable residents ==
- Celestyn Myślenta (1588–1653), Polish Lutheran theologian and university lecturer
- Bernhard Sauvant (1910–1967), Wehrmacht officer
