= Piłaki Wielkie =

- Village
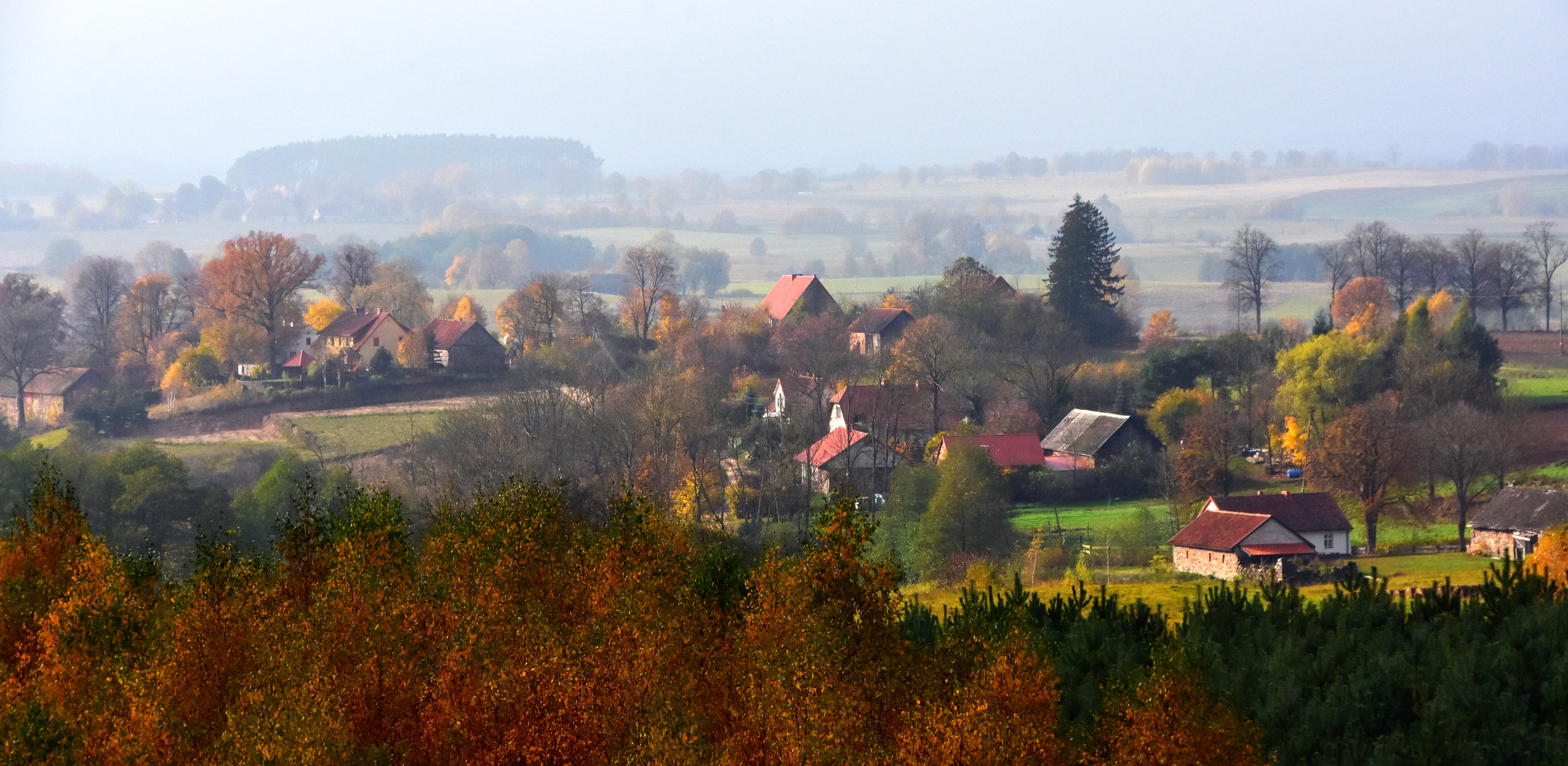

- Location within Poland
- Coordinates: 54°12′N 21°58′E
- Country: Poland
- Voivodeship: Warmian-Masurian
- County: Węgorzewo
- Gmina: Pozezdrze
- Time zone: UTC+1 (CET)
  - Summer (DST): UTC+2 (CEST)
- Vehicle registration: NWE

Piłaki Wielkie [piˈwaki ˈvjɛlkʲɛ] is a village in the administrative district of Gmina Pozezdrze, within Węgorzewo County, Warmian-Masurian Voivodeship, in northern Poland. It is located in Masuria.
