= Czarna Średnia =

- Village
- Location within Poland
- Coordinates: 52°36′N 22°49′E
- Country: Poland
- Voivodeship: Podlaskie
- County: Siemiatycze
- Gmina: Grodzisk

Czarna Średnia [ˈt͡ʂarna ˈɕrɛdɲa] is a village in the administrative district of Gmina Grodzisk, within Siemiatycze County, Podlaskie Voivodeship, in north-eastern Poland.
