= Bogusze-Litewka =

- Village
- Location within Poland
- Coordinates: 52°34′35″N 22°41′4″E
- Country: Poland
- Voivodeship: Podlaskie
- County: Siemiatycze
- Gmina: Grodzisk

Bogusze-Litewka [bɔˈɡuʂɛ liˈtɛfka] is a village in the administrative district of Gmina Grodzisk, within Siemiatycze County, Podlaskie Voivodeship, in north-eastern Poland.
