= Church of the Dormition of the Theotokos, Boćki =

Orthodox church in Boćki, Poland

Church of the Dormition of the Theotokos
- Cerkiew Zaśnięcia Matki Bożej
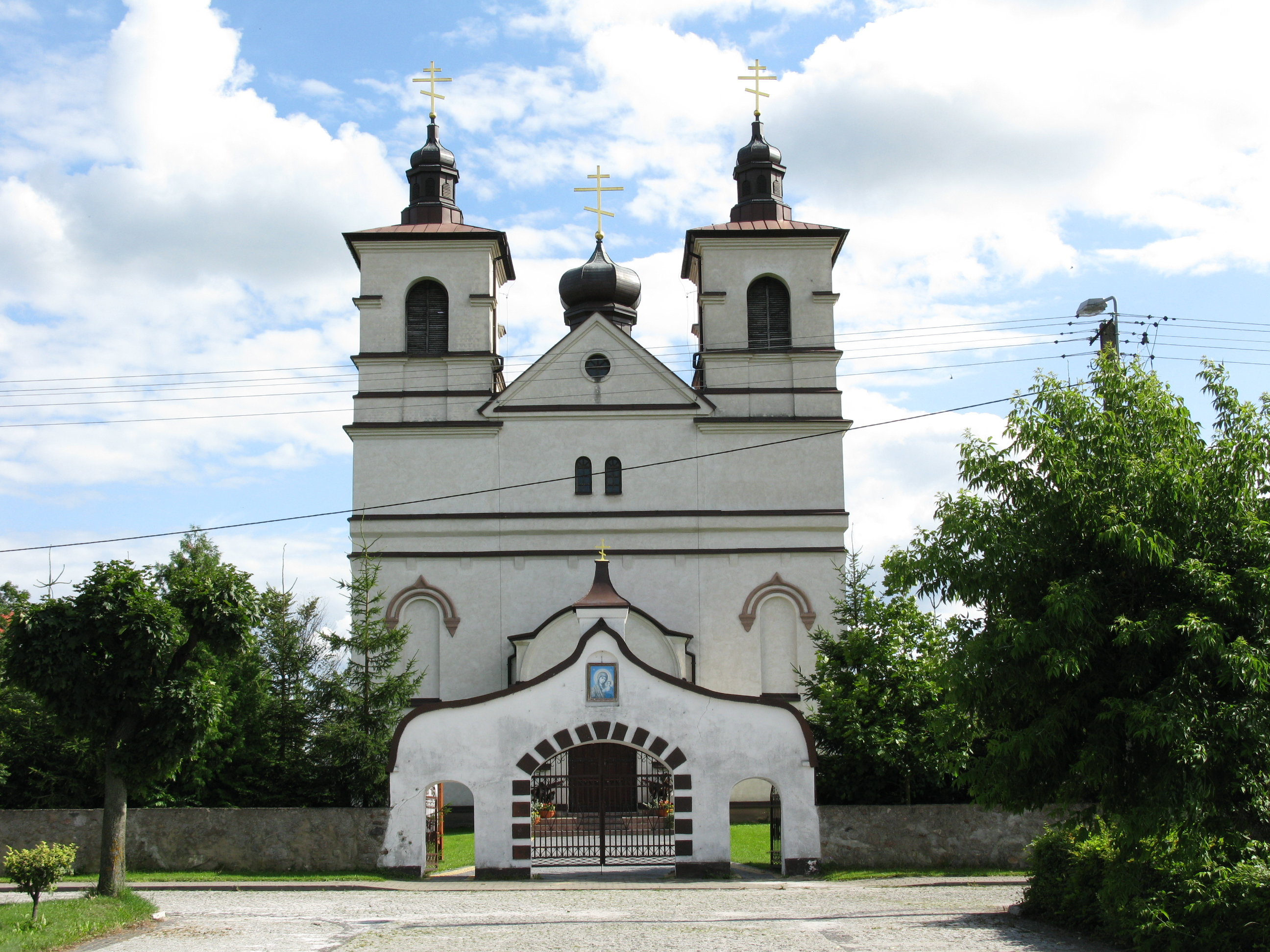
- Church of the Dormition of the Theotokos
- 52°39′01.4″N 23°02′33.7″E
- Location: Boćki
- Country: Poland
- Denomination: Eastern Orthodoxy
- Churchmanship: Polish Orthodox Church

History
- Status: active Orthodox church
- Founder: Joachim Karol Potocki
- Dedication: Dormition of the Mother of God
- Dedicated: August 28, 2002

Architecture
- Style: Neoclassical
- Years built: 1765–1828

Specifications
- Materials: brick

Administration
- Diocese: Diocese of Warsaw and Bielsk

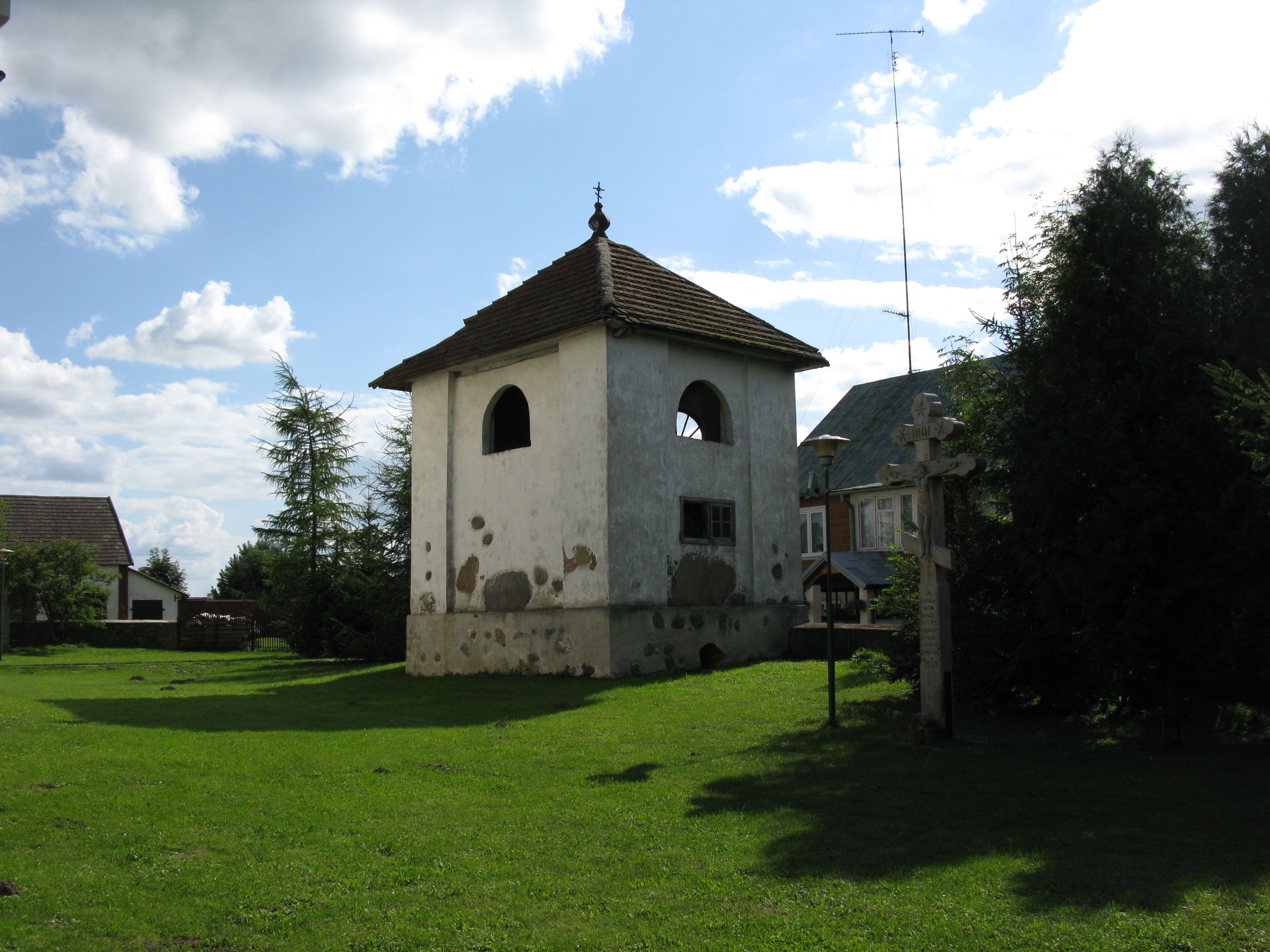
Bell tower

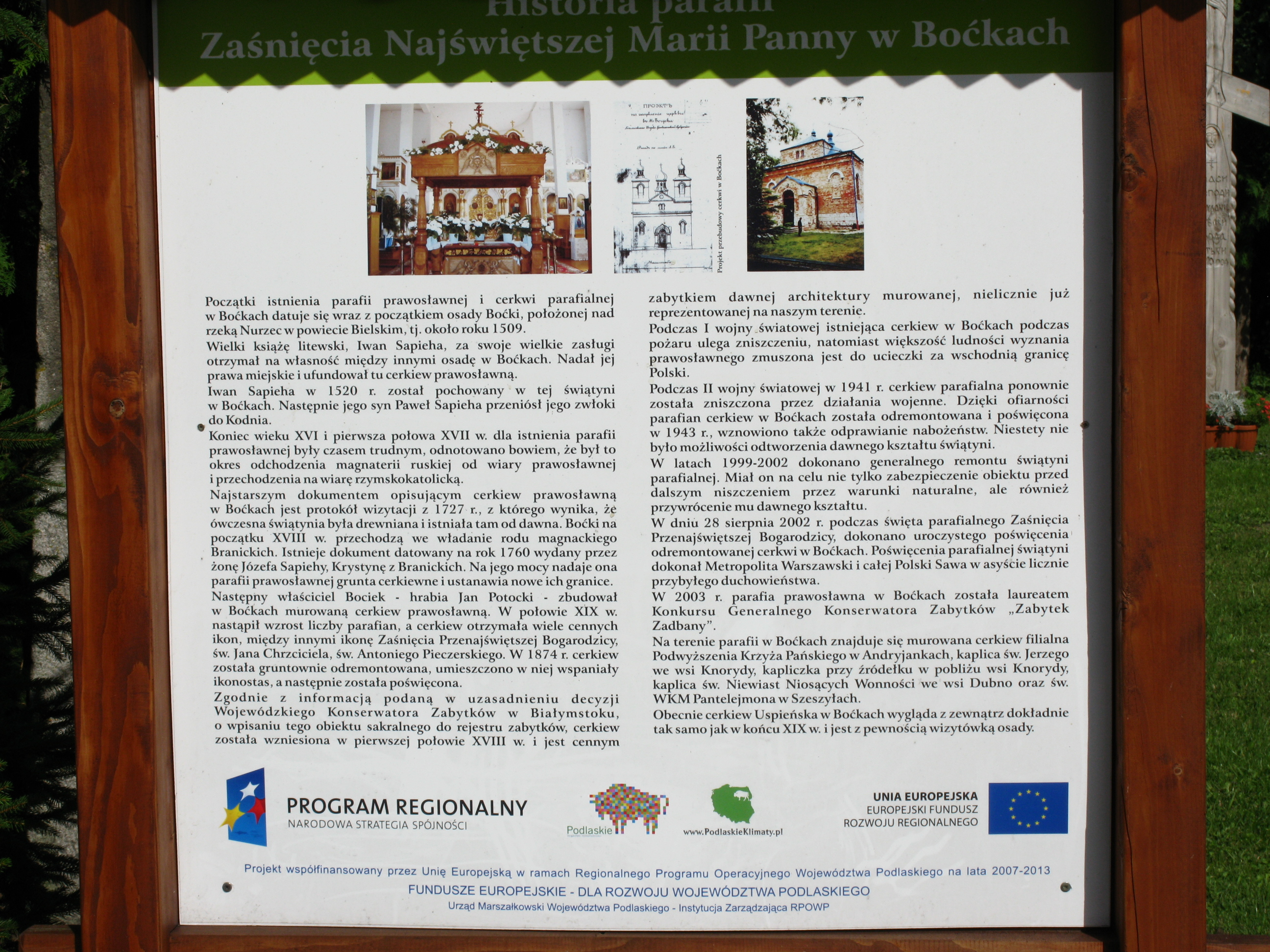
Plaque in front of the church with information about the history of the parish and the temple

The Church of the Dormition of the Theotokos is a parish church of the Polish Orthodox Church located in Boćki, part of the Bielsk Podlaski Deanery of the Diocese of Warsaw and Bielsk. The church is situated in the center of the village, at Armii Krajowej Square.

The Orthodox parish in Boćki has existed since the early 16th century. After the signing of the Union of Brest, it adopted the Union's provisions, and the initial Uniate church in the village was a wooden structure. The brick church of this rite was constructed, according to various sources, in the 18th century, between 1819 and 1824, or in 1820. In 1839, following the decisions of the Synod of Polotsk, the local parish was incorporated into the Russian Orthodox Church. After the January Uprising, under the initiative of Ignacy Boreysza, the head of the Bielsk County, the building was reconstructed to obscure its original architecture and make it resemble Orthodox churches in native Russian lands.

The building was damaged during World War I. In independent Poland, it initially functioned as a branch of the Parish of St. Michael the Archangel in Bielsk Podlaski, and from 1929, it again served as a parish church. It suffered significant damage during World War II when both towers and the roof collapsed due to German shelling. In 1943, it was provisionally reconstructed. The original appearance of the building was restored during a comprehensive renovation between 1999 and 2002. It is the only brick Orthodox church with two towers in the Podlachia region.

== History ==
=== First Orthodox church ===
An Orthodox church likely existed in Boćki from the very beginning of the settlement. In 1509, the town was granted to Ivan Sapieha, the voivode of Podlachia, who endowed it with town rights and founded a new Orthodox religious building. He was also buried there in 1520. In 1577, sources recorded that the parish of this denomination owned significant property in Boćki, including houses within the town. After the Union of Brest, the local pastoral establishment accepted its provisions, likely by the end of the first half of the 17th century, similar to other churches in the region.

=== Uniate church ===
A canonical visitation protocol from 1727 noted that a wooden Uniate church had existed in Boćki for a long time. The parish still held significant land assets, though these were reduced in the same century when Boćki became the property of the Branicki family, who bore the Gryf coat of arms. In 1760, Krystyna Sapieha, née Branicka, once again granted land to the parish and defined new boundaries for its estate. Until 1797, the parish in Boćki remained within the structures of the Uniate Eparchy of Volodymyr and Brest. In that year, the Uniate parish in Boćki became part of the Drohiczyn Deanery of the Diocese of Suprasl and remained there until the administration was dissolved in 1807. It then became part of the Uniate Metropolitan Diocese of Vilnius.

According to some sources, the brick Uniate church in Boćki was built by Jan Alojzy Potocki between 1819 and 1824 or in 1820, three years before Potocki sold the Boćki estate. In the justification of the decision by the Provincial Heritage Conservator in Białystok, the building was dated to the first half of the 18th century.

The building was consecrated as a Uniate church in 1824 and was dedicated to the Dormition of the Theotokos. Boćki was one of the towns where the most Uniate conversions to the Latin rite were recorded at the end of the 18th and early 19th centuries.

The strong influence of Latin Catholicism on the Uniate parish in Boćki is evidenced by the fact that the building was originally almost identical to the classical churches being constructed during the same period. The only indication of its Uniate affiliation was the presence of crosses with double horizontal bars atop the towers. The interior furnishings of the church in the 18th and 19th centuries were also heavily Latinized, reflecting the prevailing tendencies in the development of the Uniate Church, in line with the directives of the Synod of Zamość of 1720. In the 1830s, the consistory of the Uniate Vilnius Metropolis, led by Bishop Joseph Semashko, began efforts to change this situation, preparing for the eventual conversion of the entire administration to Orthodoxy. At the beginning of the de-Latinization campaign in 1834, the consistory identified the most important and wealthiest churches in the metropolis. Among these were 16 churches in Podlachia, including the sacral building in Boćki.

In the 1830s, the church did not have an iconostasis, which was typical for Latinized Uniate churches in the Podlachia region. Instead, a row of icons was hung on one of the walls in a manner resembling the deesis row of an iconostasis, with other icons placed above them in a more arbitrary arrangement. The Uniate church in Boćki also housed an organ and a pulpit.

In 1835, a Russian Orthodox main altar and a sacrificial table, as well as an iconostasis structure, were installed in the building. The organ was removed from the church before June 1837. Earlier, by 1836, the church in Boćki had received a complete set of Orthodox liturgical vessels. In the same year, liturgical books printed in St. Petersburg, adapted to the Synodal Rite, were also provided to the parish. However, the Uniate pulpit was left in the Boćki church, as the consistory deemed its presence in the large building not to be an issue.

Due to his opposition to the planned conversion to Orthodoxy, the parson of Boćki, Bazyli Wysiekirski (one of the signatories of a letter sent in 1838 by several Uniate priests to the Tsar, requesting permission to remain in the Uniate rite), was removed from his position in 1838. The parishioners unsuccessfully petitioned the consistory for his reinstatement.

Just before the conversion to Orthodoxy in 1839, the local parish was estimated to have 1,500 members living in Boćki and nearby villages. According to another source, in 1838, the Boćki parish had 1,822 members, of whom 1,475 were actively practicing.

The parish in Boćki officially joined the Russian Orthodox Church in 1839, in accordance with the decisions of the Synod of Polotsk, along with all other Uniate churches in the region.

=== Orthodox church in the Russian partition ===
After the January Uprising, Ignacy Borejsza, who came from a Polish landowning family but was completely Russified, served as the military commander of the Bielsk County. At his initiative, several chapels and monuments commemorating the suppression of the independence movement were erected in the district. Additionally, renovations of Orthodox churches were undertaken, incorporating Russian Revival architectural styles. In 1864, Borejsza initiated a meeting of a commission composed of local Russian authorities and clergy (including the local parson and dean) to discuss possible construction work in Boćki. During this meeting, it was decided to replace the flooring, substitute the 1836 iconostasis with a new one, and purchase a baptismal font, processional banners, two bells, and an Epitaphios. There was also a plan to renovate the rectory built in 1852. The participants concluded that the parishioners were too poor to finance the renovation.

In 1866, the local Orthodox community independently decided to include roof replacement, construction of a wooden ceiling, and painting the entire building as part of the renovation. That same year, a cost estimate was prepared, and a government grant was secured for the full amount – 3,174 rubles and 59 kopeks. In 1872, it was determined that the original amount was insufficient, and an additional 1,657 rubles were needed for the renovation. These costs were to be covered by the parishioners, but in case they could not raise the funds, they were allowed to apply for a loan from the Ministry of Internal Affairs. Since the local population had become impoverished due to fires and cattle plagues in the early 1870s, the parishioners immediately applied for such a loan, securing it with their own property.

The first renovation plan was drafted by architect Grosman, but his work was deemed inadequate, and a second project was commissioned from Leonard Krzyżanowski, a civilian provincial architect. He developed two proposals for the church's renovation. The first plan preserved the original character of the building, proposing only to top the towers with onion domes and to enlarge and reshape the windows. These changes were considered insufficiently radical, and the project was rejected. The accepted plan featured a central onion-shaped pseudo-dome on the roof ridge and onion domes on the two towers, which in the new design would no longer be the building's main dominant feature. Krzyżanowski also introduced elements reminiscent of Moscow architecture into the Boćki church, altering the portal's shape and decorating the windows with kokoshnik arches.

The sculptor Koronowski was hired to perform the woodcarving work on the iconostasis, which was also designed by Krzyżanowski. New icons for the iconostasis were purchased, funded by Joannikiy Kłopotowski, a merchant from Moscow, possibly originally from Podlachia, along with three additional icons, cast iron crosses for the domes, and sheet metal for the roof covering. In addition to state loan funds, the parishioners also contributed private funds to the renovation; the purchase of icons was further supported by Father Dmitriy Nowski, serving at the Dormition Cathedral in Moscow. A church porch was added to the building, onion domes were erected, and the windows were modified, with four semicircular openings on the façade replaced by eight arched windows. Additional windows were also created in the chancel and on the towers. The construction work was completed in December 1874.

The parish in Boćki belonged to the Drohiczyn Deanery of the Diocese of Lithuania. After the Diocese of Grodno and Vawkavysk was established, it became part of that jurisdiction. In 1864, the church had over 1,900 parishioners, and by the early 20th century, the number of parishioners was estimated at 2,260.

The church was severely damaged by a fire during World War I, which completely destroyed its interior. Most of the local faithful were in exile at the time; Orthodox residents began returning to the village after 1920.

=== After 1918 ===
The returning Orthodox faithful in Boćki carried out provisional repairs on the church to make it suitable for services. The Polish Ministry of Religious Affairs and Public Education initially refused to register a parish in the village. Consequently, the church operated as a filial entity of the Parish of St. Michael the Archangel in Bielsk Podlaski. It regained its status as a parish church in 1929.

During World War II, in 1941, the church suffered severe damage due to German shelling. The two towers and the ridge turret over the nave were ruined, the roof collapsed, and the interior furnishings were destroyed. In 1943, basic repairs were made to the structure, allowing it to be used for liturgical purposes once again. Due to a lack of funds, the towers were not rebuilt. The destruction and the two provisional post-war repairs led to the elimination of some architectural elements introduced during Krzyżanowski's renovation. The church was not re-dedicated until 1955. It was added to the register of historical monuments on 3 November 1966 under the number A-399.

In 1999, a comprehensive renovation of the entire building commenced, funded by voluntary contributions from parishioners and a donation from Anatol Siegień, an Orthodox clergyman of Polish origin serving in the United States. During the renovation, the foundations were replaced, the walls were reinforced, a dome over the nave was erected, and the towers were rebuilt to their former height based on a design by architect Marek Tryburski. Mold-infested plasters were removed, the ground around the church was drained, and nearby trees were cut down. New domes were installed, a new copper roof was laid, the interior columns and iconostasis were restored, and the church grounds were enclosed with a new fence and a renovated entrance gate. The primary initiator of the renovation was the local parish priest, Father Witalis Gawryluk, who eventually gained the support of local authorities and residents, not limited to the Orthodox community.

The church was re-dedicated by Metropolitan Sawa of Warsaw and all Poland on 28 August 2002. In 2003, a year after the completion of the renovation and its re-dedication, the church became the first Orthodox church in Poland – and the second historic building in Podlachia – to receive the Well-Kept Monument title awarded by the General Conservator of Monuments. In the early 21st century, the church's congregation was estimated to comprise about 800 members.

== Bibliography ==
- Dzienisiuk, A. (2009). "Historia parafii Zaśnięcia Matki Bożej w Boćkach". Kalendarz Prawosławny (in Polish). Warsaw: Warszawska Metropolia Prawosławna. ISSN 1425-2171.
- Matus, I. (2013). Schyłek unii i proces restytucji prawosławia w obwodzie białostockim w latach 30. XIX wieku (in Polish). Białystok: Wydawnictwo Uniwersytetu w Białymstoku. ISBN 978-83-7431-364-3.
- Kołamajska-Saeed, M. (1994). "Cerkiew w Boćkach. Problemy rebizantynizacji". In Konstantynów, D.; Paszkiewicz, P. (eds.). Kultura i polityka. Wpływ polityki rusyfikacyjnej na kulturę zachodnich rubieży Imperium Rosyjskiego (1772–1915) (in Polish). Warsaw: Instytut Sztuki PAN. ISBN 83-85938-06-0.
