= Grodzisk, Siemiatycze County =

Grodzisk
- Village
- Location within Poland
- Coordinates: 52°35′2″N 22°44′17″E
- Country: Poland
- Voivodeship: Podlaskie
- County: Siemiatycze
- Gmina: Grodzisk
- Population: 640

Grodzisk [ˈɡrɔd͡ʑisk] is a village in Siemiatycze County, Podlaskie Voivodeship, in north-eastern Poland. It is the seat of the gmina (administrative district) called Gmina Grodzisk.
