= Masurian Canal =

Abandoned canal between Poland and Russia

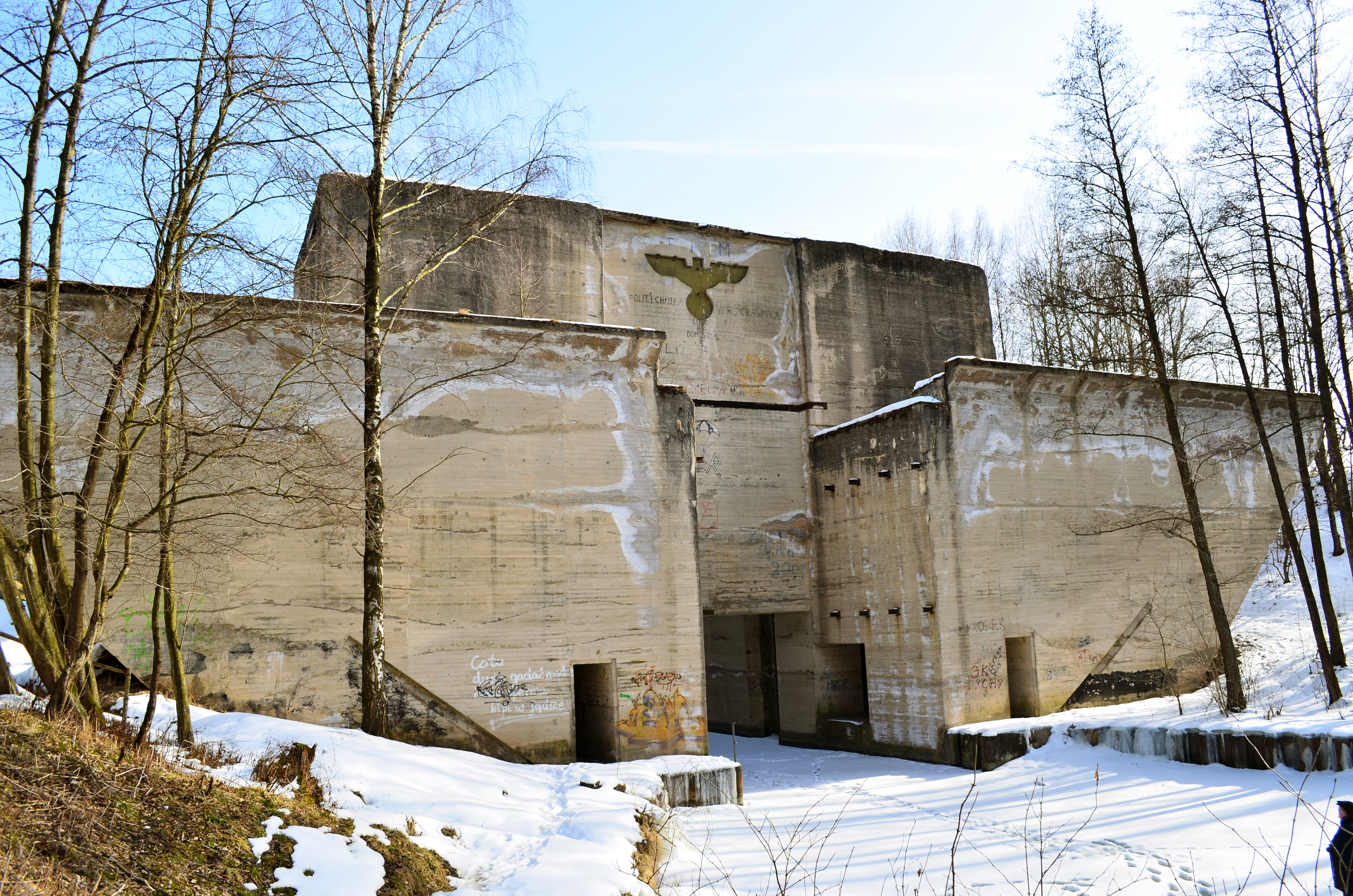
- The lock at Leśniewo with its Reichsadler recess

Specifications
- Locks: 10
- Total rise: 110.7 metres (363 ft)
- Status: Abandoned

History
- Date of act: 14 May 1908
- Construction began: April 1911

Geography
- Start point: Łyna, Kaliningrad Oblast, Russia
- End point: Lake Mamry, Poland
- Beginning coordinates: 54.5012°N 21.1955°E
- Ending coordinates: 54.1910°N 21.6524°E

The Masurian Canal (Polish: Kanał Mazurski, Russian: Мазурский Канал, German: Masurischer Kanal) is a 50.4-kilometre-long (31.3 mi) abandoned canal in Poland and Russia in Central Europe. Planned to connect Königsberg (Kaliningrad) and Mauersee (Lake Mamry) in Prussia, construction of the canal was paused for the World Wars and hyperinflation in the Weimar Republic, before being abandoned.

== History ==
Proposals for a canal connecting the Masurian Lakes area with the Baltic Sea at Königsberg existed from the 18th century, when other canal schemes to connect the Masurian Lakes were enacted by Johann Friedrich Domhardt. An early proposal would have had a canal from Lake Ryńskie to the sea making substantial use of river navigations, and another plan was to have a canal leave Lake Mamry north via Węgielsztyn. A further plan for a canal was proposed in 1849, and a survey was drawn up by 1862. This plan would have used inclined planes as on the nearby Elbląg Canal. Failure to acquire consent from landowners was one reason this proposal did not come to fruition.

In 1890, hydraulic engineer August Hess—who had previously designed the Aller Canal—revised the plans to replace the inclined planes with locks, publishing The Masurian Shipping Canal in East Prussia (German: Der Masurische Schiffahrtskanal in Ostpreußen) in 1892. Two years later, engineer Otto Intze published his Expert Opinion on the Utilization of Considerable Water Power for Industrial Purposes Through the Masurian Shipping Canal (German: Gutachten über die Nutzbarmachung erheblicher Wasserkräfte für industrielle Zwecke durch den Masurischen Schiffahrtskanal) which recommended the installation of hydroelectric power stations at the locks.

By 1898 the Landtag approved the land purchase of 200,000 ℳ. On 14 May 1908, authorisation was given to construct a 50.4-kilometre (31.3 mi) navigable waterway between Königsberg and Lake Mamry. (Note: In 1945, following the Second World War, Königsberg was renamed Kaliningrad and is now part of Russia's Kaliningrad Oblast; since 1945 Lake Mamry has been within Poland) The canal, planned to make use of the Pregolya and Łyna rivers upstream of Königsberg and a canal from Allenburg (now Druzhba) to Mamry, would drop approximately 110.7 metres (363 ft) from the lakes to the river.

A second phase of construction would have seen an extension to the Narew valley which would have provided an onward connection to Warsaw.

=== Construction ===
After authorisation of the canal, the works were divided into two schemes; the first was from the Łyna to the Gerdauen–Nordenburg railway line, and the second was from the railway line to Lake Mamry. The contract for construction was given to Philipp Holzmann and Dyckerhoff & Widmann, and construction began in April 1911.

Construction was halted at the outbreak of the First World War in 1914; the canal was described as being "far from complete" with only two locks having been started. In September 1914, engagements of the First Battle of the Masurian Lakes took place near the canal works.

When construction recommenced after the war, completion was planned for 1940. Many navvies came from western Germany and had accommodation in barracks near the works; some of these later settled in Druzhba. Local men were also employed, which stimulated local economy. In 1921, it was again suggested that the canal could be used for hydroelectric power, with a recognised capacity of up to 20,000,000 kilowatt-hours (72,000,000 MJ). The following year, hyperinflation in the Weimar Republic again put works on hold. At this point, construction of most of the locks had begun, with one at Allenburg complete.

Construction recommenced in 1934, using local and forced labour, with a proposed completion of May 1941 and a projected total cost of 19,500,000 ℛℳ. In 1936, the lock at Kostromino was reported to have been complete.

The outbreak of the Second World War again halted construction; the cut was complete but many of the locks along the waterway remained unfinished. Navvies were subsequently employed to construct Adolf Hitler's nearby Wolf's Lair and the Mauerwald (Mamerki) base of the OKH; a legend suggests that the canal's real purpose was to serve a secret U-boat facility at Mauerwald.

Works were finally abandoned in 1942. The Polish–Soviet border agreement of August 1945 divided the course of the canal, with 20.43 kilometres (12.69 mi) assigned to Poland and 29.97 kilometres (18.62 mi) to the USSR. After the Second World War, many of the mechanisms at the locks and weirs were looted.

== Route ==
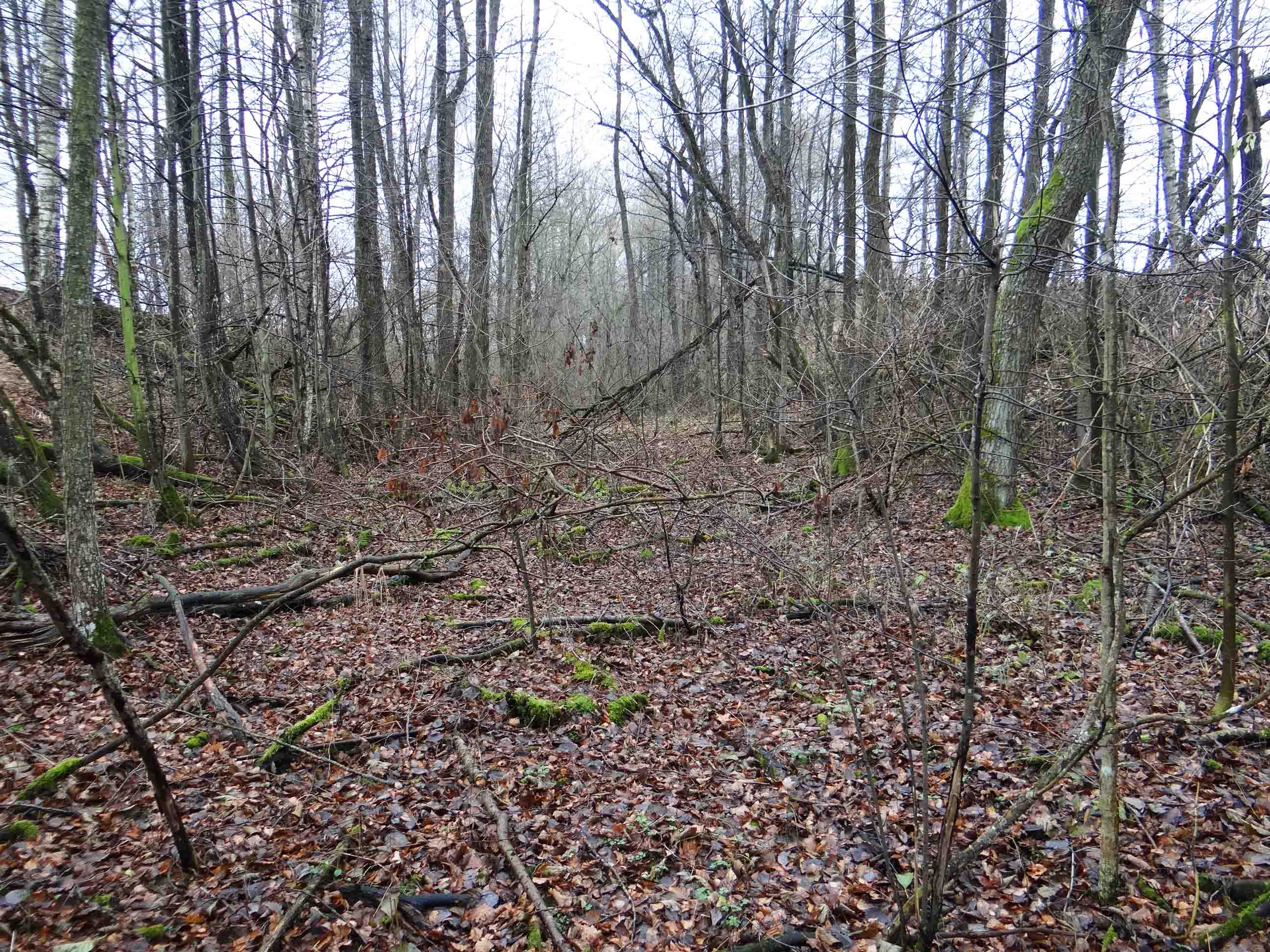
The dry abandoned canal bed in the Russian section

The canal begins at a fortified junction with Lake Przystań, a bay on the west side of Lake Mamry, at approximately 116.4 metres (382 ft) AMSL. Heading west, the canal was crossed by a road bridge and a railway bridge carrying the Kętrzyn–Węgorzewo line. The first lock, Leśniewo Upper Lock, is that with the greatest rise. Beyond the second lock, Leśniewo Lower Lock, the first cut ends and the waterway makes use of Lake Rydzówka for 3.5 kilometres (2.2 mi) of its route. The canal heads north from the lake on another cut, through Piaski Lock, the only completed lock on the Polish side of the canal. Passing the Marszałki forest, the canal drops through locks at Bajory Małe and Bajory Wielkie. Beyond the locks the canal was crossed by the narrow gauge railway between Barciany and Krylovo. The last lock on the Polish side, Długopole Lock, had the lowest rise of any on the canal. Adjacent to the lock was a watchtower, now administered by the Polish Teachers' Union.

North of the Poland–Russia border, the dry canal bed heads north-west and was crossed by the Zheleznodorozhny–Krylovo railway; the bridge is now demolished. The route passes through forest and the lost village of Wikrowo. The first lock in Russia is Ozerki Lock, beyond which is a railway bridge defended by anti-tank obstacles. After the next lock, near the village of Marinovka, the canal passes the Mauenwalde estate before heading west and reaching a lock at Kostromino. At Druzhba, two locks drop the canal to the level of the Łyna (approximately 5.1 metres (17 ft) AMSL); after the village, the canal enters a sweeping curve to the north to join the river.

== Specifications ==
The cut was dug to a specification of 2.5 metres (8 ft 2 in) depth and a maximum beam of 13 metres (43 ft). The beam at waterline (i.e. the breadth of the canal from bank to bank) was 23 metres (75 ft). The canal alternated between cuttings and embankments, with some earthworks reaching 15 metres (49 ft) high. The channel was lined with 20 centimetres (7.9 in) of stone to prevent leakage. Where the canal was cut through marshy ground, it was further strengthened with reinforced concrete. In inhabited areas such as villages and farms, the channel was secured with barbed wire and fencing.

The minimum-curve radius was designed to be 400 metres (1,300 ft) to allow Finowmaß-specification vessels (i.e. those measuring 40.2 by 4.6 metres (132 ft × 15 ft) and capable of navigating the Finow Canal) to navigate bends at full speed. At these locations, the channel was widened by 3–4 metres (9.8–13.1 ft).

=== Locks ===
Ten locks were constructed on the canal, with chambers made of reinforced concrete using the Torkret injection method. These were placed in one of three categories based on the pressure caused by the hydraulic head above the lock:

1. Category 1 – locks with a rise less than 8 metres (26 ft) (Długopole Lock, Marinovka Lock, Druzhba Lock 1, and Druzhba Lock 2)
2. Category 2 – locks with a rise of 8–12 metres (26–39 ft) (Piaski Lock, Bajory Lock, and Kostromino Lock)
3. Category 3 – locks with a rise greater than 12 metres (39 ft) (Leśniewo Upper Lock, Leśniewo Lower Lock, and Ozerki Lock)

These categories dictated the power systems used to drive the mechanisms of the gates, the need for side pounds (groups 2 and 3 only) to reduce water consumption when lockaging, and the type of lock gate used. Those extant gates show that they were constructed of steel; three different gate designs were employed—double mitre gates, vertically-lifting gates, and flat-folding gates. Operation was primarily electromechanical via a chain drive and rack and pinion gear (mitre gates) or a counterweighted drum motor system (vertical gates). The locks had the ability to be manually operated if necessary.

The superstructure of the upper lock at Leśniewo features a recess for the Reichsadler of the coat of arms of the Third Reich.

At the abandonment of works, the locks were in varying states of completion.

Lock name	Image	Distance from Łyna	Distance from Lake Mamry	Rise/fall	Location	Country (Note: since 1945)	Coordinates
Druzhba Lock 1 (Note: Polish: Śluza Drużba I; German: Mündungsschleuse Allenburg (English: Allenburg Estuary Lock))		1.2 km (0.75 mi)	49.2 km (30.6 mi)	6.9 m (22 ft 8 in) (Note: The depths of the uppermost three locks would have been affected by seasonal fluctuation of the Masurian Lakes levels, and the lowest by seasonal fluctuation of the Łyna. The rise of the upper locks vary up to 0.6 metres (2 ft 0 in) and the lowest by 1.3 metres (4 ft 3 in))	Druzhba, Pravdinsky District	Russia	54.4936°N 21.1973°E
Druzhba Lock 2 (Note: Polish: Śluza Drużba II; German: Bahnhofschleuse Allenburg (English: Allenburg Station Lock))		2.2 km (1.4 mi)	48.2 km (30.0 mi)	8 m (26 ft 3 in)	Druzhba, Pravdinsky District	Russia	54.4881°N 21.2107°E
Kostromino Lock (Note: Polish: Śluza Kostromino; German: Schachtschleuse Groß Allendorf (English: Greater Allendorf Lock))		8 km (5.0 mi)	42.4 km (26.3 mi)	12 m (39 ft 4 in)	Kostromino, Pravdinsky District	Russia	54.4732°N 21.2950°E
Marinovka Lock (Note: Polish: Śluza Marinowka; German: Schleuse Wilhelmshof (English: Wilhelmshof Lock))		14.4 km (8.9 mi)	36 km (22 mi)	7.5 m (24 ft 7 in)	Marinovka, Pravdinsky District	Russia	54.4367°N 21.3651°E
Ozerki Lock (Note: Polish: Śluza Ozierki; German: Schachtschleuse Georgenfelde (English: Georgenfelde Lock))		19.8 km (12.3 mi)	30.6 km (19.0 mi)	15.5 m (50 ft 10 in)	Ozerki, Pravdinsky District	Russia	54.3980°N 21.4012°E
Długopole Lock (Note: Polish: Śluza Długopole; German: Schleuse Langenfeld (English: Langenfeld Lock))		32.3 km (20.1 mi)	18.1 km (11.2 mi)	6.5 m (21 ft 4 in)	Bajory Wielkie, Gmina Srokowo	Poland	54.3062°N 21.4948°E
Bajory Lock (Note: Polish: Śluza Bajory; German: Schachtschleuse Bajohren (English: Bajohren Lock))		35.8 km (22.2 mi)	14.6 km (9.1 mi)	10.5 m (34 ft 5 in)	Bajory Małe, Gmina Srokowo	Poland	54.2786°N 21.5231°E
Piaski Lock (Note: Polish: Śluza Piaski; German: Schachtschleuse Sandhof (English: Sandyard Lock))		40.9 km (25.4 mi)	9.5 km (5.9 mi)	11.1 m (36 ft 5 in)	Guja, Gmina Węgorzewo	Poland	54.2520°N 21.5789°E
Leśniewo Lower Lock (Note: Polish: Śluza Leśniewo Dolne; German: Unterschleuse Fürstenau (English: Fürstenau Lower Lock))		45.4 km (28.2 mi)	5 km (3.1 mi)	16.2 m (53 ft 2 in)	Leśniewo, Gmina Srokowo	Poland	54.2128°N 21.5881°E
Leśniewo Upper Lock (Note: Polish: Śluza Leśniewo Górne; German: Oberschleuse Fürstenau (English: Fürstenau Upper Lock))		49.1 km (30.5 mi)	1.3 km (0.81 mi)	16.5 m (54 ft 2 in)	Leśniewo, Gmina Srokowo	Poland	54.2084°N 21.5937°E

== Bibliography ==
- Paul Blunk: Der halbfertige Masurische Kanal. Landesdruckerei, Königsberg 1929. (in German)
- Krzysztof Stachowski: Kanał Mazurski. Monografia nieukończonej drogi wodnej Giżycko 2024. ISBN 978-83-968621-0-5. (in Polish)
- Robert Sarnowski: A Guidebook to the Masurian Canal Lost & Found Books 2025, ISBN 979-8287334413.
