= Silec =

- Village
- Location within Poland
- Coordinates: 54°10′N 21°33′E
- Country: Poland
- Voivodeship: Warmian-Masurian
- County: Kętrzyn
- Gmina: Srokowo

Silec [ˈɕilɛt͡s] is a village in the administrative district of Gmina Srokowo, within Kętrzyn County, Warmian-Masurian Voivodeship, in northern Poland, close to the border with the Kaliningrad Oblast of Russia. The area lies approximately 6 km (4 mi) south of Srokowo, 15 km (9 mi) north-east of Kętrzyn, and 81 km (50 mi) north-east of the regional capital Olsztyn.
