= Domhardt =

Domhardt is a German surname. Notable people with the surname include:

- Gerd Domhardt (1945–1997), German composer
- Johann Friedrich Domhardt (1712–1781), Prussian administrator
