= Pieczarki =

Pieczarki may refer to:

- Pieczarki, Kętrzyn County, Poland
- Pieczarki, Węgorzewo County, Poland
