= Pyszki =

- Pyszki, Warmian-Masurian Voivodeship, settlement in the administrative district of Gmina Srokowo, within Kętrzyn County, Warmian-Masurian Voivodeship, in northern Poland
- Pyszki, West Pomeranian Voivodeship, settlement in the administrative district of Gmina Polanów, within Koszalin County, West Pomeranian Voivodeship, in north-western Poland
