= Łęknica (disambiguation) =

Łęknica may refer to the following places:

- Łęknica in Lubusz Voivodeship (west Poland)
- Łęknica, Warmian-Masurian Voivodeship (north Poland)
- Łęknica, West Pomeranian Voivodeship (north-west Poland)
