= Lesk =

Lesk may refer to:

- Łęsk, a settlement in Warmian-Masurian Voivodeship, Poland
- Arthur M. Lesk, American molecular biologist
- Mike Lesk, American computer scientist
- Lesk algorithm, a classical algorithm for word sense disambiguation
- Training Air Wing, Finnish Air Force (Finnish: Lentosotakoulu; LeSK), the Finnish Air Force pilot jet aircraft training school
