= Różanka-Leśniczówka =

- Village
- Location within Poland
- Coordinates: 54°08′55″N 21°31′01″E
- Country: Poland
- Voivodeship: Warmian-Masurian
- County: Kętrzyn
- Gmina: Srokowo

Różanka-Leśniczówka (Polish pronunciation: [ruˈʐaŋka lɛɕɲiˈtʂufka]) is a village in the administrative district of Gmina Srokowo, within Kętrzyn County, Warmian-Masurian Voivodeship, in northern Poland, close to the border with the Kaliningrad Oblast of Russia.
