= Bajory Małe =

- Village
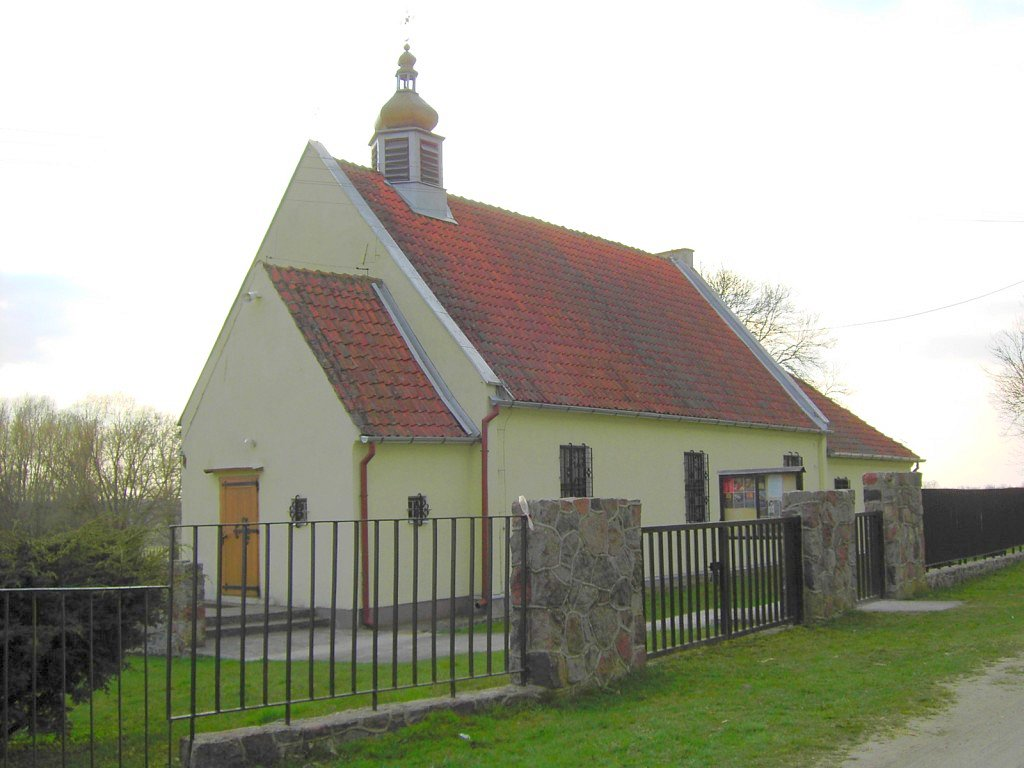
- Presentation of Mary Church in Bajory Małe

- Location within Poland
- Coordinates: 54°17′8″N 21°31′17″E
- Country: Poland
- Voivodeship: Warmian-Masurian
- County: Kętrzyn
- Gmina: Srokowo
- Population: 40
- Time zone: UTC+1 (CET)
  - Summer (DST): UTC+2 (CEST)
- Vehicle registration: NKE

Bajory Małe [baˈjɔrɨ ˈmawɛ] is a village in the administrative district of Gmina Srokowo, within Kętrzyn County, Warmian-Masurian Voivodeship, in northern Poland, close to the border with the Kaliningrad Oblast of Russia.

The Bajory Małe Lock of the Masurian Canal is located near the village.
