= Neman, Russia =

Town in Kaliningrad Oblast, Russia

Neman Неман
- Town
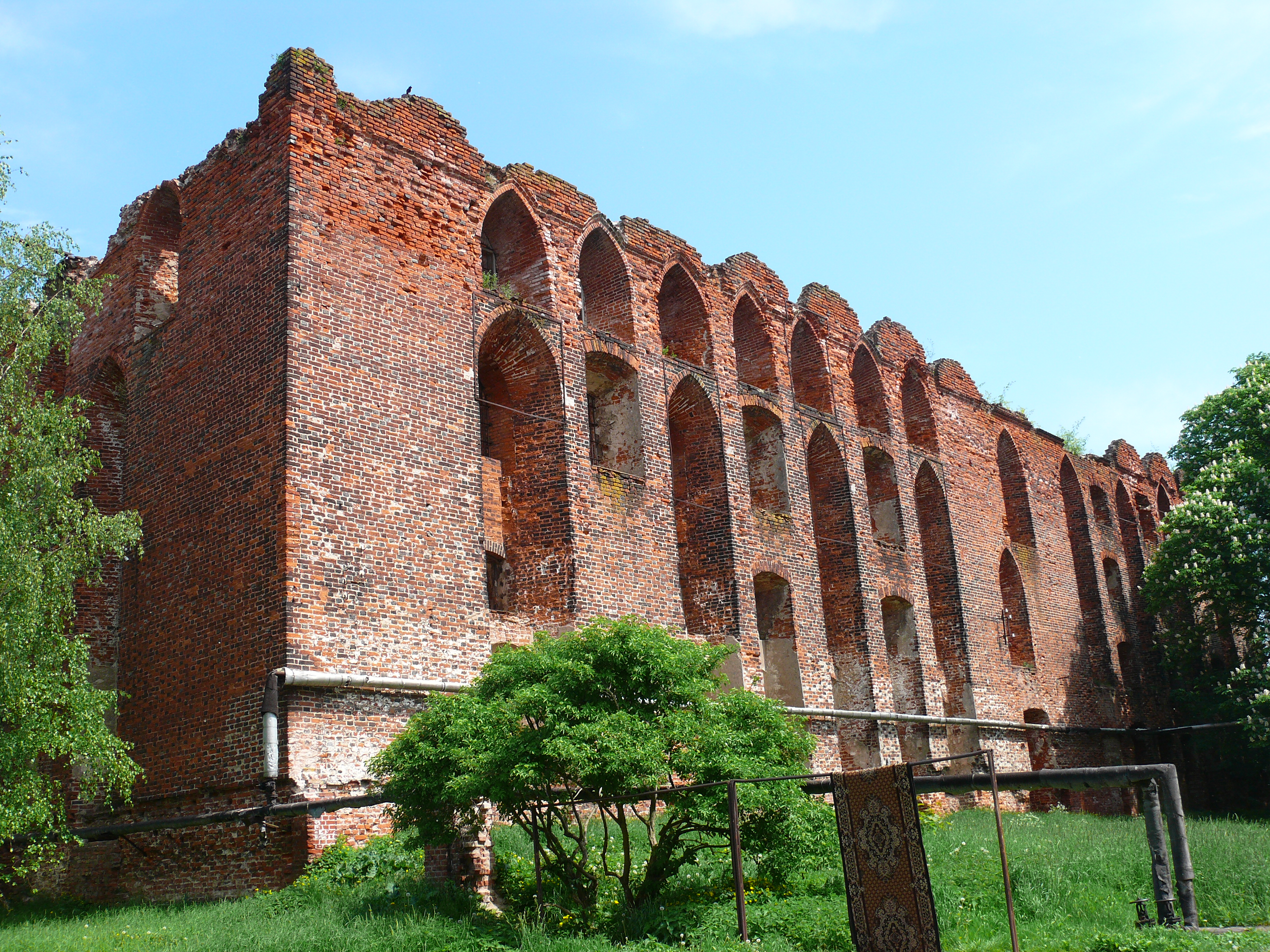
- Castle ruins

- Flag Coat of arms
- Interactive map of Neman
- Location of Neman Neman (Kaliningrad Oblast)
- Coordinates: 55°02′N 22°02′E
- Country: Russia
- Federal subject: Kaliningrad Oblast
- Administrative district: Nemansky District
- Town of district significanceSelsoviet: Neman
- Founded: 1288
- Town status since: 1722
- Elevation: 20 m (66 ft)

Population (2010 Census)
  - Total: 11,798
  - Estimate (2023): 9,216 (−21.9%)

Administrative status
  - Capital of: Nemansky District, town of district significance of Neman

Municipal status
  - Municipal district: Nemansky Municipal District
  - Urban settlement: Nemanskoye Urban Settlement
  - Capital of: Nemansky Municipal District, Nemanskoye Urban Settlement
- Time zone: UTC+2 (MSK–1)
- Postal codes: 238710, 238711
- Dialing code: +7 40162
- OKTMO ID: 27514000001
- Website: neman.gov39.ru

Neman (Russian: Не́ман; German: Ragnit; Lithuanian: Ragai̇̃nė; Polish: Ragneta) is a town and the administrative center of Nemansky District in Kaliningrad Oblast, Russia, located in the historic region of Lithuania Minor, on the steep southern bank of the Neman River, where it forms the Russian border with the Klaipėda Region in Lithuania, and 130 kilometers (81 mi) northeast of Kaliningrad, the administrative center of the oblast. Population figures: 11,798 (2010 census); 12,714 (2002 census); 13,821 (1989 Soviet census).

== History ==
=== Foundation and early history ===
Ragnita (from Old Prussian: ragas, "spur"), founded in 1288, was a settlement of the Baltic (Old Prussian) tribe of Skalvians. It was contested by the Grand Duchy of Lithuania since its creation in the 13th century, and on April 23, 1289 it was conquered by the Teutonic Knights, who built a castle there between 1397 and 1409, which later became the seat of a Komtur. Construction works were supervised by the Master of the Teutonic Order Konrad Fellenstein of Marienburg. A few decades later, a now-destroyed 25 meter guard tower was built onto the castle. The stronghold was called Landeshut, but the name did not become popular and the name Ragnit, after a local river, a tributary of the Memel (outside of Prussia called Neman), continued to be used.

Although the settlement had an important castle not only guarding the Prussian lands of the State of the Teutonic Order from the north but also serving as a military base for the Knights' campaigns into adjacent Samogitia, it was living in the shadow of the nearby city of Tilsit (present-day Sovetsk). In 1454, King Casimir IV Jagiellon incorporated the region into the Kingdom of Poland upon the request of the anti-Teutonic Prussian Confederation. After the subsequent Thirteen Years' War (1454–1466) the Teutonic Knights regained authority over the city as a fief of the Polish Crown. Afterwards the strategic importance of Ragnit declined. After the dissolution of the Order's State under its last Grand Master Albrecht von Hohenzollern, Ragnit on April 10, 1525 became a part of the Duchy of Prussia, which was ruled by the House of Hohenzollern as a fief of the Polish Crown until 1657.

=== Early modern period ===
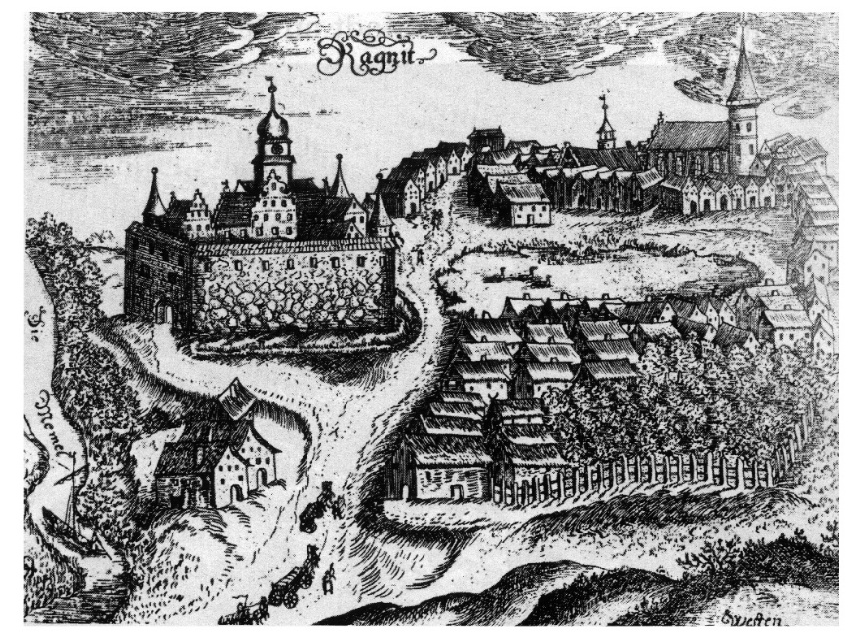
Castle and settlement, 1684

After the Reformation, the local Lutheran parish initially was Lithuanian, and the Lithuanian pastors held the title of district archpriests until the mid-17th century. From 1549 to 1563, famous Lithuanian writer and translator (who wrote the first book in the Lithuanian language, "Catechismusa Prasty Szadei" ("The Simple Words of Catechism")) Martynas Mažvydas was priest and Archdiacon of Ragainė. While living in Ragainė he wrote "The Song of St. Ambrosy" (with a dedication in Lithuanian), translated "The Form of Baptism" from German into Lithuanian, published "The Prussian Agenda" into the prayer "Paraphrasis". One of his major works was "The Christian Songs" (Giesmės Krikščioniškos). In 1590 and 1592, conferences of priests from Lithuania Minor were held there to discuss Jonas Bretkūnas' Lithuanian translation of the Bible.

Ducal Prussia was inherited by the Hohenzollern margraves of Brandenburg in 1618, becoming an integral part of Brandenburg-Prussia, whereby remote Ragnit retained its status as a regional capital.

Ragnit was devastated by Tatars during the Second Northern War in 1656 and again by Swedish forces during the Scanian War in 1678, while the "Great Elector" Frederick William of Brandenburg had achieved full sovereignty over Ducal Prussia by the 1657 Treaty of Wehlau. His son and successor Elector Frederick III elevated himself to a King in Prussia in 1701. Around half of the population of the settlement and surrounding area, mostly Lithuanians, died during the Great Northern War plague outbreak and famine in 1709–11. Afterwards immigrants from Salzburg were settled in the area by Prussian authorities. King Frederick William I of Prussia granted Ragnit town privileges on April 6, 1722. It was again destroyed during the Seven Years' War, this time by Russian forces in 1757.

=== 19th century ===
Incorporated into the Province of East Prussia from 1815, Ragnit became a part of the German Empire upon the Prussian-led unification of Germany in 1871. A military garrison was founded in 1824. The castle, having long lost its defensive purpose, became a court and prison.

In the 19th century, after the January Uprising when the Lithuanian language was banned from the office in all of Russian-ruled Lithuania, books in that language were printed in Ragnit and then smuggled to Russia by the Lithuanian book smugglers (knygnešiai). The Lithuanian newspaper Auszra began publishing in the town in 1883, and later also the Nemuno sargas, Varpas and Ūkininkas newspapers were printed there.

For centuries, the area was inhabited primarily by Lithuanians. In 1870, the majority of parishioners were Lithuanians, however, as a result of Germanisation and German settlement, the percentage of Lithuanians in the local Protestant parish fell, according to official Prussian statistics, to 24.9% in 1897. At the local teachers' seminary, founded in 1882, classes were taught in Lithuanian until 1902, and a local branch of the Lithuanian Conservative Election Societies operated in the town. According to German data 17,500 Lithuanians lived in the Ragnit district in 1890 (32% of the population). Lithuanian church services were held until 1944.

On November 1, 1892, a railroad line linking the town with Tilsit (now Sovetsk) was opened. New enterprizes, factories and facilities were established in the late 19th and early 20th century, including a machine factory in 1883, a slaughterhouse in 1887, a gasworks in 1898, and an agricultural school in 1901.

=== 20th century ===
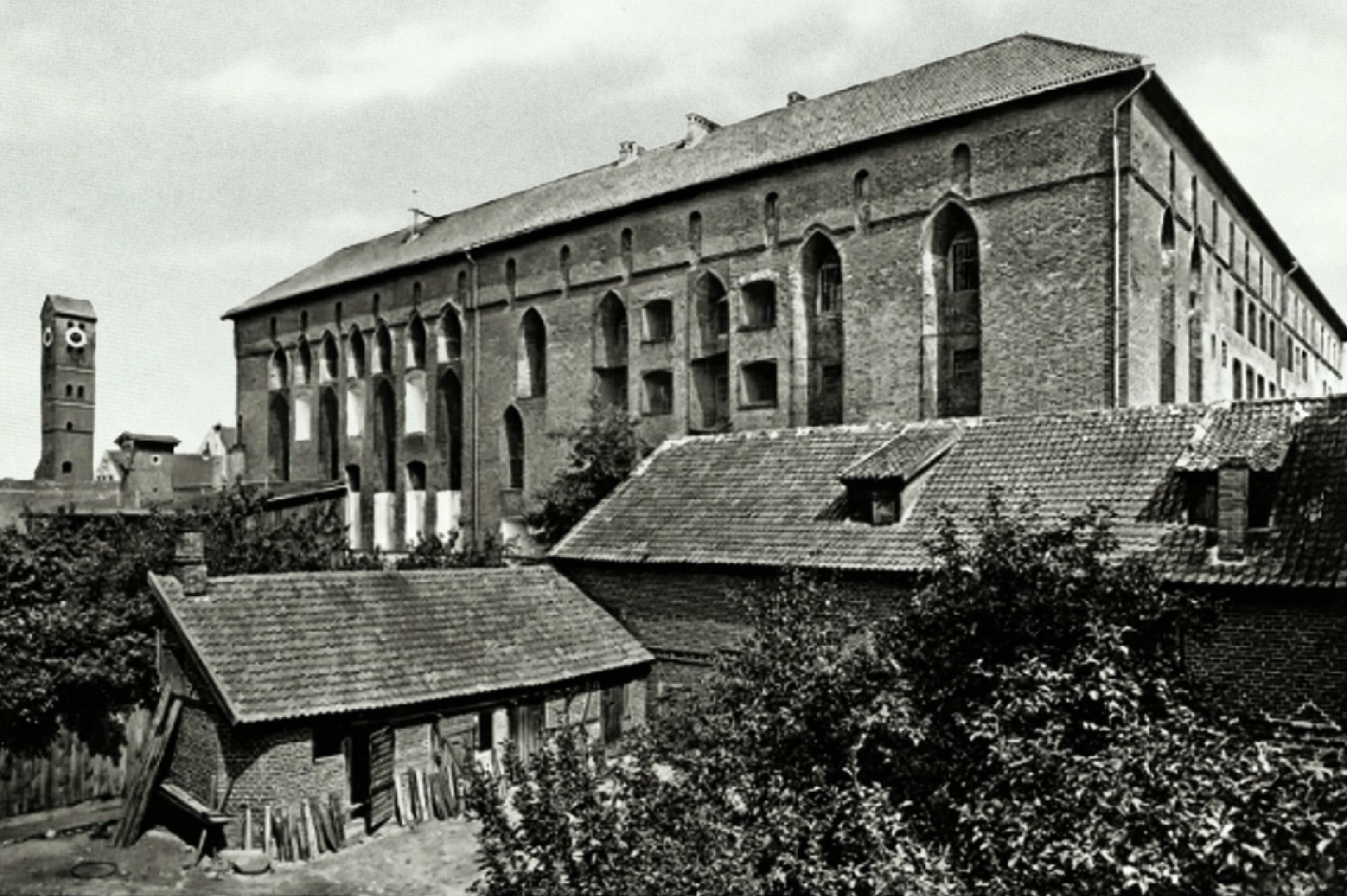
The castle in 1912

When Germany had to cede the Klaipėda Region north of the Neman River to the Conference of Ambassadors according to the 1919 Treaty of Versailles, Ragnit became a border town. In 1922, it lost its status as an administrative capital in favor of Tilsit. It was the location of a Nazi prison under Nazi Germany.

During World War II, on January 19, 1945, Ragnit was captured without a fight by the 3rd Belorussian Front of the Red Army in the course of the East Prussian Offensive. Much of the town was destroyed, including the castle, which remains ruined. In accordance to the 1945 Potsdam Agreement, the town became a part of Kaliningrad Oblast of the Russian SFSR. It was renamed to Neman in 1946. Most of the local inhabitants who had not fled during the Soviet conquest were subsequently expelled to Germany in accordance with the Potsdam Agreement.

== Administrative and municipal status ==
Within the framework of administrative divisions, Neman serves as the administrative center of Nemansky District. As an administrative division, it is, together with nineteen rural localities, incorporated within Nemansky District as the town of district significance of Neman. As a municipal division, the town of district significance of Neman is incorporated within Nemansky Municipal District as Nemanskoye Urban Settlement.

== Demographics ==
Historical population

Year	Pop.	±%
1782	1,882	—
1816	2,100	+11.6%
1850	2,875	+36.9%
1895	4,908	+70.7%
1912	6,734	+37.2%

Year	Pop.	±%
1932	9,447	+40.3%
1989	13,821	+46.3%
2002	12,714	−8.0%
2010	11,798	−7.2%

In 2010 Lithuanians composed 2.8% of the town's population, being the third largest ethnic group after Russians and Belarusians.

== Notable people ==
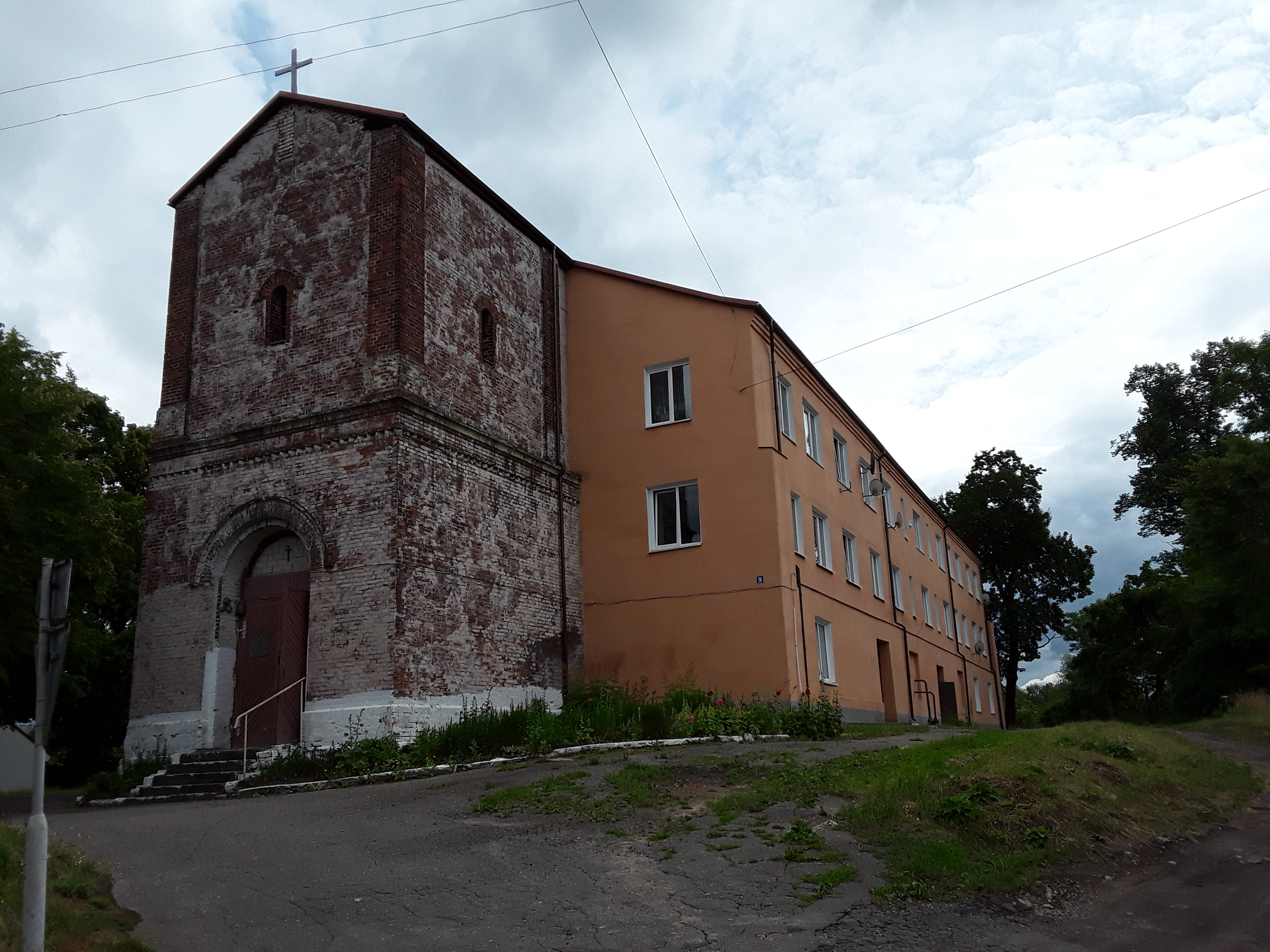
Former church

- Martynas Mažvydas (1510–1563), Lithuanian priest, writer, translator
- Johann Friedrich Domhardt (1712-1781), Administrator, Agriculturalist
- Johann Friedrich Reiffenstein (1719–1793), German painter, antiquarian
- Julius Bacher (1810–1889), German novelist
- Martynas Jankus (1858-1946), Lithuanian printer, publicist
- Erich Klossowski (1875-1949), German-Polish art historian, painter
- Walter Bruno Henning (1908–1967), German scholar

== International relations ==
=== Twin towns and sister cities ===
Neman is twinned with:

- Lida, Belarus
- Preetz, Germany
