= Sówka, Warmian–Masurian Voivodeship =

Sówka
- Village
- Location within Poland
- Coordinates: 54°14′26″N 21°32′14″E
- Country: Poland
- Voivodeship: Warmian-Masurian
- County: Kętrzyn
- Gmina: Srokowo

Sówka [ˈsufka] is a village in the administrative district of Gmina Srokowo, within Kętrzyn County, Warmian-Masurian Voivodeship, in northern Poland, close to the border with the Kaliningrad Oblast of Russia.
