= Niedziały, Gmina Srokowo =

Niedziały
- Village
- Location within Poland
- Coordinates: 54°10′19″N 21°26′18″E
- Country: Poland
- Voivodeship: Warmian-Masurian
- County: Kętrzyn
- Gmina: Srokowo

Niedziały [ɲɛˈd͡ʑawɨ] is a village in the administrative district of Gmina Srokowo, within Kętrzyn County, Warmian-Masurian Voivodeship, in northern Poland, close to the border with the Kaliningrad Oblast of Russia.
