= Chojnica, Warmian-Masurian Voivodeship =

Chojnica
- Village
- Location within Poland
- Coordinates: 54°10′N 21°29′E
- Country: Poland
- Voivodeship: Warmian-Masurian
- County: Kętrzyn
- Gmina: Srokowo
- Elevation: 29 m (95 ft)

Chojnica [xɔi̯ˈnit͡sa] is a village in the administrative district of Gmina Srokowo, within Kętrzyn County, Warmian-Masurian Voivodeship, in northern Poland, close to the border with the Kaliningrad Oblast of Russia.
