= Kałki, Warmian-Masurian Voivodeship =

Kałki
- Village
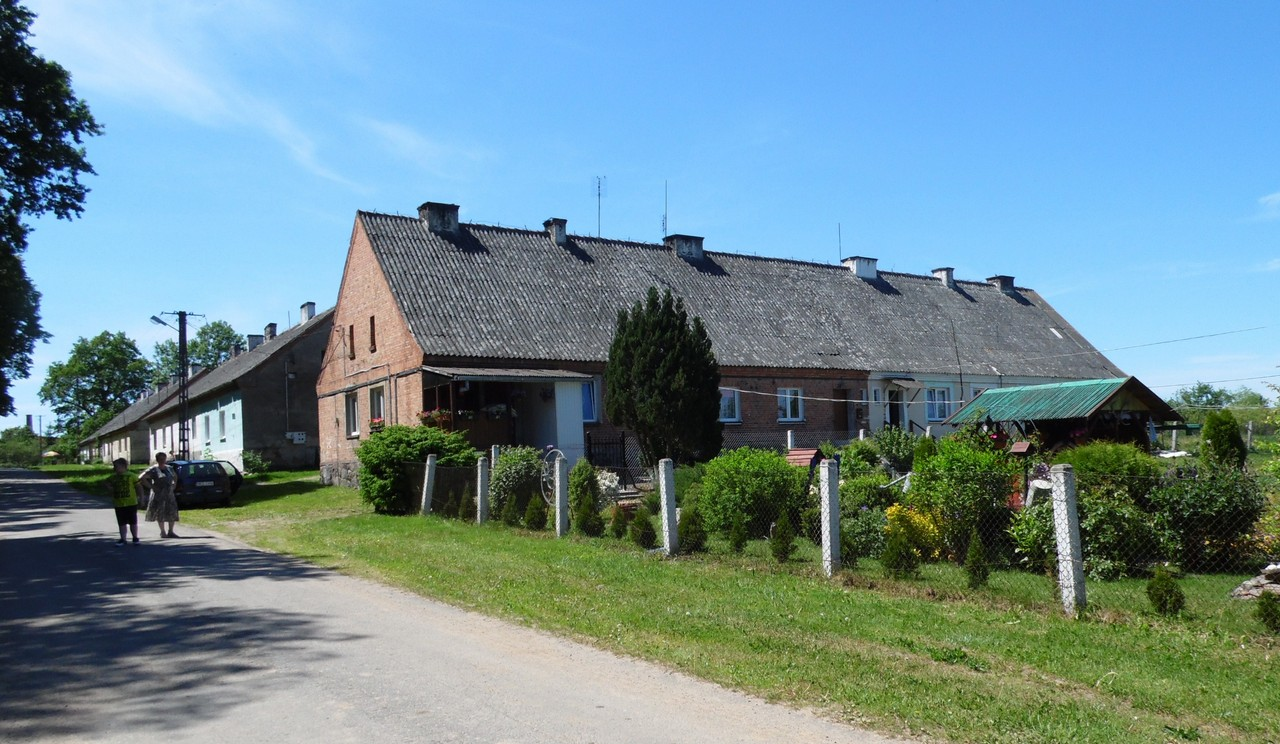
- Manor in Kałki

- Location within Poland
- Coordinates: 54°14′43.63″N 21°29′29.83″E
- Country: Poland
- Voivodeship: Warmian-Masurian
- County: Kętrzyn
- Gmina: Srokowo

Kałki [ˈkau̯ki] is a village in the administrative district of Gmina Srokowo, within Kętrzyn County, Warmian-Masurian Voivodeship, in northern Poland, close to the border with the Kaliningrad Oblast of Russia.
