= Siniec-Cegielnia =

- Village
- Location within Poland
- Coordinates: 54°08′26″N 21°31′12″E
- Country: Poland
- Voivodeship: Warmian-Masurian
- County: Kętrzyn
- Gmina: Srokowo

Siniec-Cegielnia [ˈɕiɲɛt͡s t͡sɛˈɡʲɛlɲa] is a village in the administrative district of Gmina Srokowo, within Kętrzyn County, Warmian-Masurian Voivodeship, in northern Poland, close to the border with the Kaliningrad Oblast of Russia.
