= Kaczory, Warmian-Masurian Voivodeship =

Kaczory
- Settlement
- Location within Poland
- Coordinates: 54°12′28″N 21°35′17″E
- Country: Poland
- Voivodeship: Warmian-Masurian
- County: Kętrzyn
- Gmina: Srokowo

Kaczory [kaˈt͡ʂɔrɨ] is a settlement in the administrative district of Gmina Srokowo, within Kętrzyn County, Warmian-Masurian Voivodeship, in northern Poland, close to the border with the Kaliningrad Oblast of Russia.
