= Johann Friedrich Domhardt =

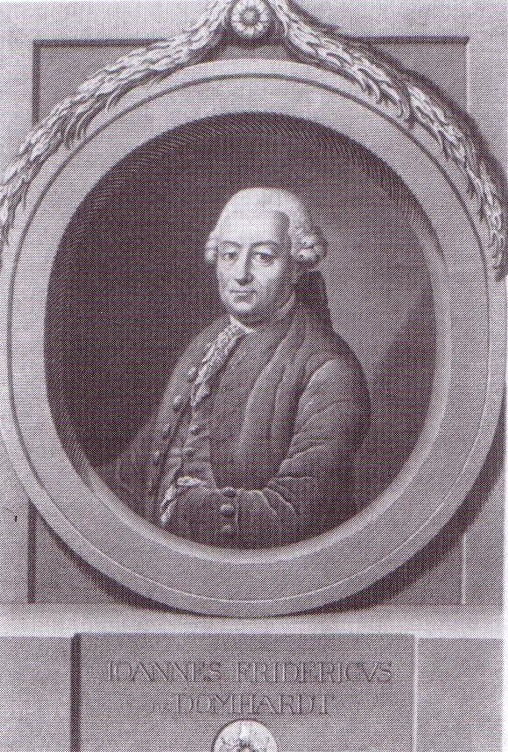
- Born: September 18, 1712; Allrode, district of Harz, in Saxony-Anhalt
- Died: November 29, 1781 (aged 69); Königsberg
- Burial place: Bestendorf
- Occupation: Administrative/Government official
- Years active: 1746–1781

Johann Friedrich Domhardt (18 September 1712 – 20 November 1781), was one of the most important and successful administrative officials of Frederick the Great's Prussia. He was the first President of East and West Prussia. Under his leadership, Frederick's royal stud farm was secured from Russian invasion and he developed and organized profitable settlement and agriculture in East Prussia.

== Family and education ==
Domhardt was the son of a domain tenant who immigrated from the Anhalt in 1724 to the north-east of Prussia. His parents were Justus Heinrich Domhardt († 1736) and his wife Katharina Gertrud Trüstedt, who came from a family of civic leaders in Gardelegen, Saxony-Anhalt. He attended the Martineum (Halberstadt) and the Royal Litvian Provincial School and acquired a good school education. His father died when he was 19 years old. Subsequently, he took over his father's lease of the property in Ragnit.

His efforts to improve farming drew the attention of Frederick William I. From 1732, Frederick William had resettled the area with Protestant refugees from the Archbishopric of Salzburg, who had been exiled by Prince-Archbishop Count Leopold Anton von Firmian. In addition, the King's son, the crown prince and later King Frederick II, became acquainted with Domhardt by 1735. When Frederick's father gave him control of the Trakehner stud farm, the Crown Prince entrusted Domhardt with the sole supervision of the royal stables, which provided much of the blood stock for the Prussian cavalry.

Upon his own ascension to the throne, Frederick remembered Domhardt's ability to grasp difficult tasks, to recognize and appropriately use the given circumstances, to maintain a firmness of judgment, to exercise power and diligence; these attributes, Frederick thought, made Domhardt an ideal of a Prussian state official. Consequently, after his accession to the throne, Frederick appointed him as a royal counselor and eventually president of the Gumbinnen Chamberin 1746. By improving local roads and rivers, and harnessing the energies of the Protestant refugees, Domhardt helped the region emerge as a critical "breadbasket" for the rest of Prussia.

=== Gumbinnen falls to Russia ===
In early 1756, shortly before the outbreak of the Seven Years' War, he was appointed the second director of the Chamber; the higher positions were reserved for nobles only. The king entrusted him with the care of the troops who were gathered against the expected Russian invasion. Domgardt showed prudent skill in mobilizing, organizing the land militia, and securing the Trakehner stud farm.

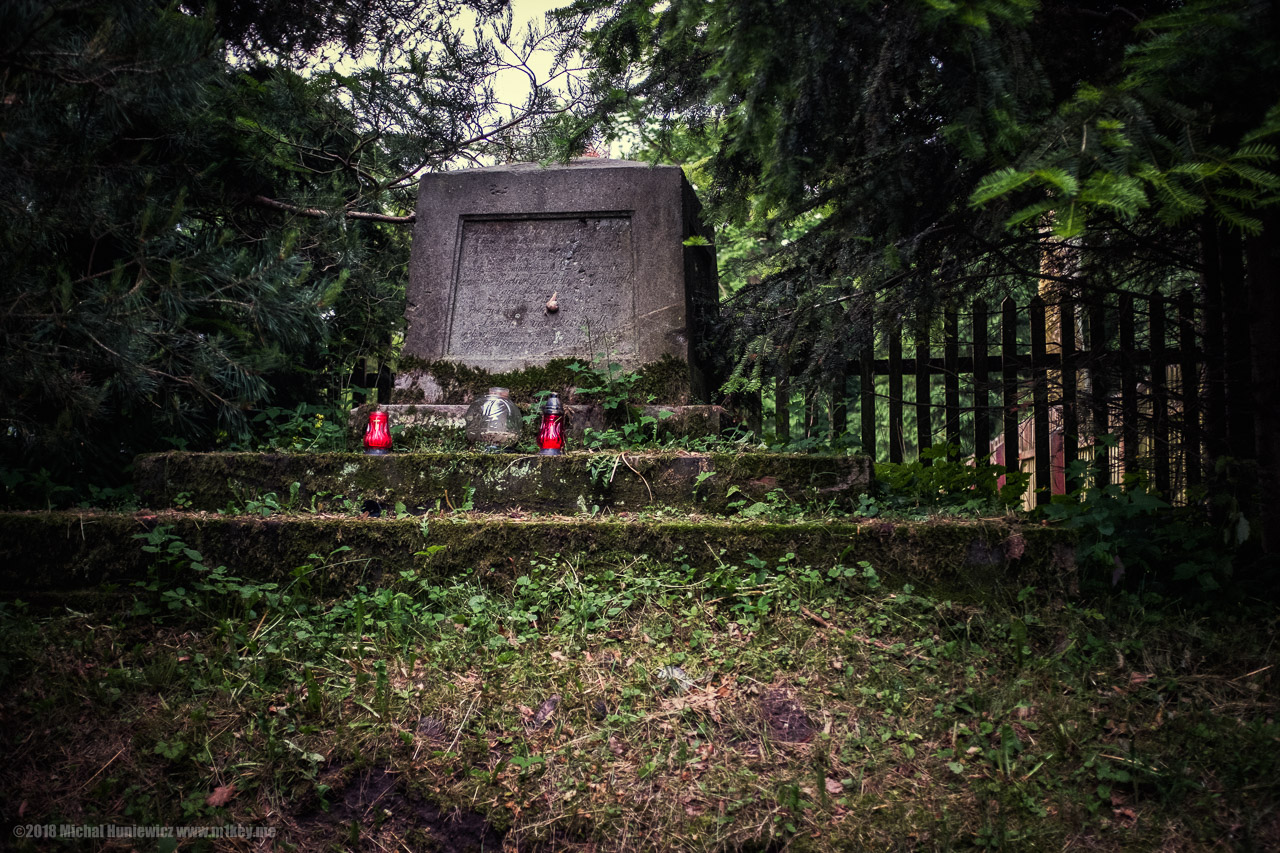
The grave of Johann Friedrich Domhardt in Dobrocin, Poland.

In the summer of 1757 the Russians, led by Count William Fermor and Field Marshal Count Stepan Fyodorovich Apraksin in East Prussia. The old Field Marshal Johann von Lehwaldt commanded the Prussian troops. At the expressed orders of the king, he attacked the Russians who were several times superior in men and artillery at Battle of Gross-Jägersdorf, west of Insterburg. The battle ended with heavy Prussian losses.

Elizabeth of Russia subsequently declared East Prussia as a Russian territory, by patent of 31 December 1757. In January 1758 a Russian army under Count Fermor occupied district. Most of the other senior civil servants fled the province before the occupation, but Domhardt remained in his post. Domhardt subsequently had to swear allegiance to the Russian Empress, but she retained him in his responsibilities; consequently, he kept the province from too heavy a war burden and, after the peace with Russia (May 5, 1762), the King acknowledged the province and made him president of the Royal Chamber. In August 1762, Frederick publicly acknowledged East Prussia as the best-preserved of all provinces.

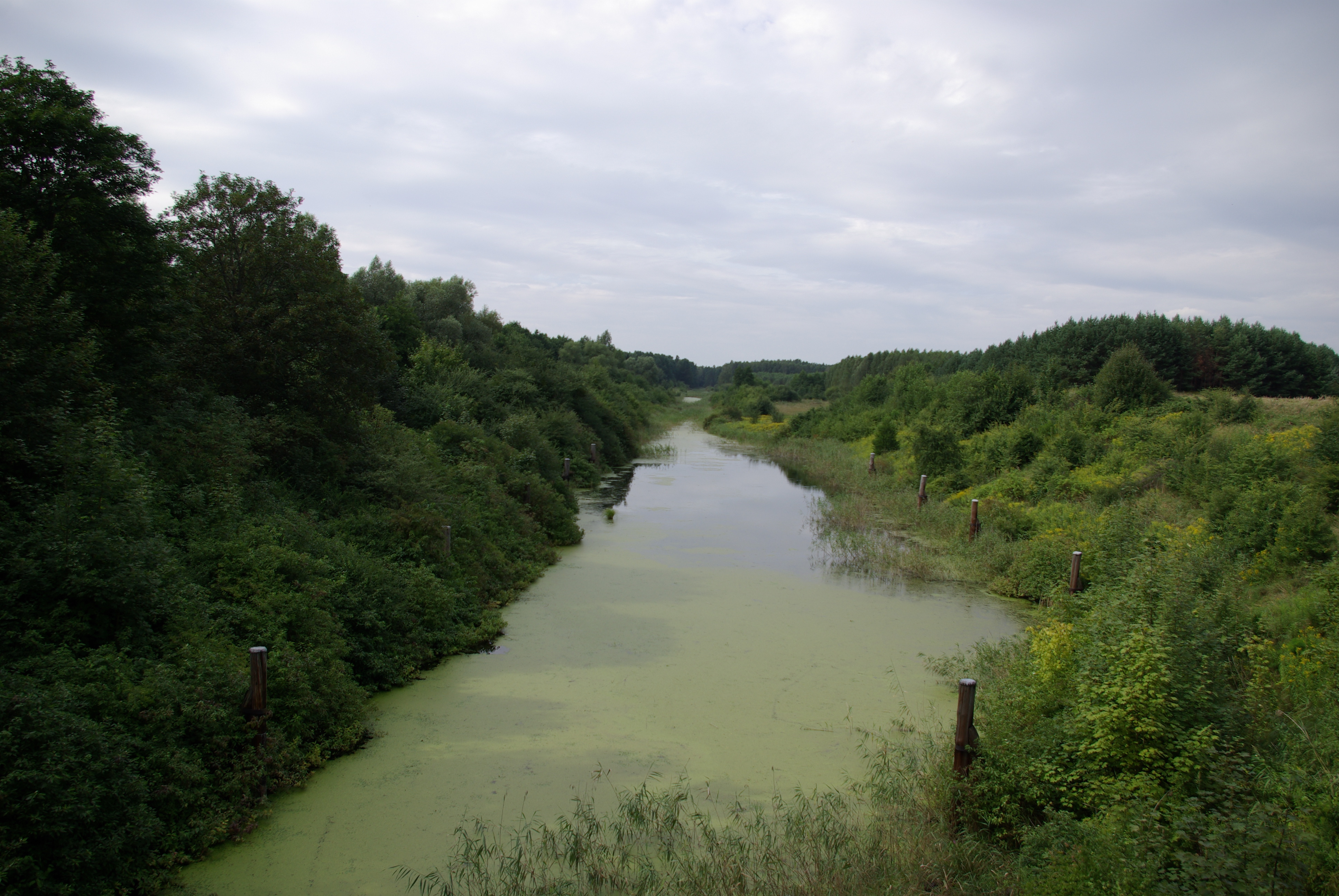
Masurian Canal was conceived in the 12th century; Domhardt started construction in the 18th, but technical difficulties in managing the meandering river caused the Prussians to give up the project.

Domhardt satisfied the King's demands for the supply of food, the recruitment of soldiers, and the acquisition of Russian magazines. In addition, he succeeded to restore the damaged land to a profitable state. Particularly noteworthy were the expansion of the Angrapa rivers flood containment and irrigation systems (1764–1774) and the settlement of 15,000 colonists. Domhardt's most laborious and in-depth activity was the construction of West Prussia from 1772 on. He planned, but did not build, the Masurian Canal.

In 1781, he became ill; with both arms paralyzed, Domhardt died in Königsberg after several weeks of sickness on 20 November. His ashes laid in Bestendorf near the district of Mohrungen.

== Marriage and children ==
He married Johanne Amalia Keydel (1716–1779), the daughter of Johann Casper Keydel, a Brunswick Forest Inspector Forstinspektor, who had also settled as a domain tenant in East Prussia. They had 10 children:

- Justus Frederick (1741–1796), Captain of Cavalry
- Ludwig Frederick (1744–1821), Financial Advisor, President of Chambers in Bromberg (1782), later Marienwerder (1786)
- Amalia Eleonore (* around 1745– before 1791)
- Ernestine Gertrud Frederica (1750–1807)
- Albertine Elisabeth Henriette (1752–1795) ∞ Sylvius Heinrich Moritz von Frankenberg und Proschlitz (1732–1795)
- Dorothea Frederica (1755–1775)
- Otto Heinrich Frederick (3 March 1756 – 1835), in 1774 served in Hesse-Kassel military,
