= Podlasie, Warmian-Masurian Voivodeship =

Podlasie
- Settlement
- Location within Poland
- Coordinates: 54°9′14″N 21°32′49″E
- Country: Poland
- Voivodeship: Warmian-Masurian
- County: Kętrzyn
- Gmina: Srokowo

Podlasie [pɔdˈlaɕɛ] is a settlement in the administrative district of Gmina Srokowo, within Kętrzyn County, Warmian-Masurian Voivodeship, in northern Poland, close to the border with the Kaliningrad Oblast of Russia.
