= Brzeźnica, Gmina Srokowo =

Brzeźnica
- Village
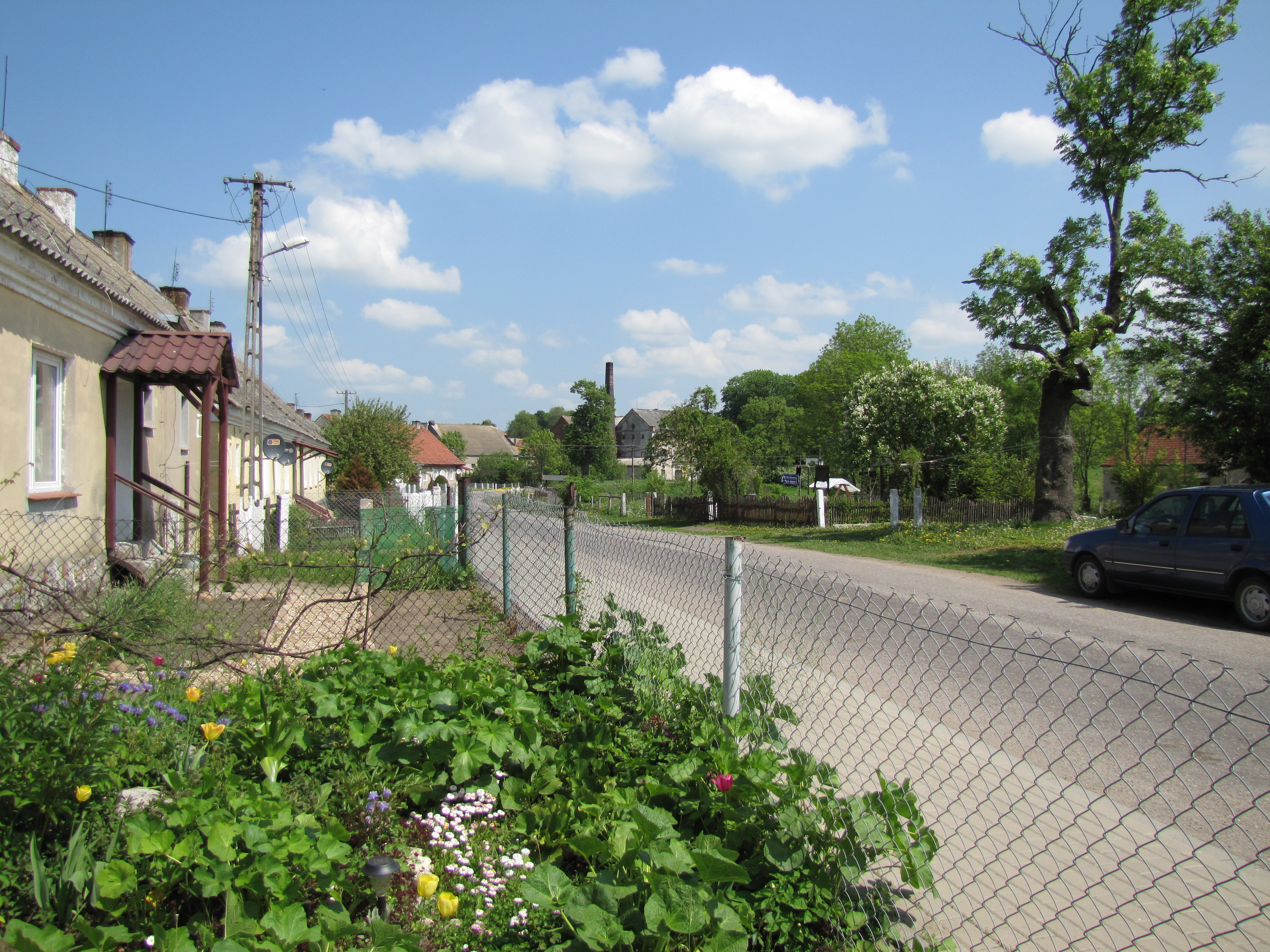

- Location within Poland
- Coordinates: 54°19′08″N 21°29′05″E
- Country: Poland
- Voivodeship: Warmian-Masurian
- County: Kętrzyn
- Gmina: Srokowo

Brzeźnica [bʐɛʑˈnit͡sa] is a village in the administrative district of Gmina Srokowo, within Kętrzyn County, Warmian-Masurian Voivodeship, in northern Poland, close to the border with the Kaliningrad Oblast of Russia.
