= Srokowski Dwór =

- Village
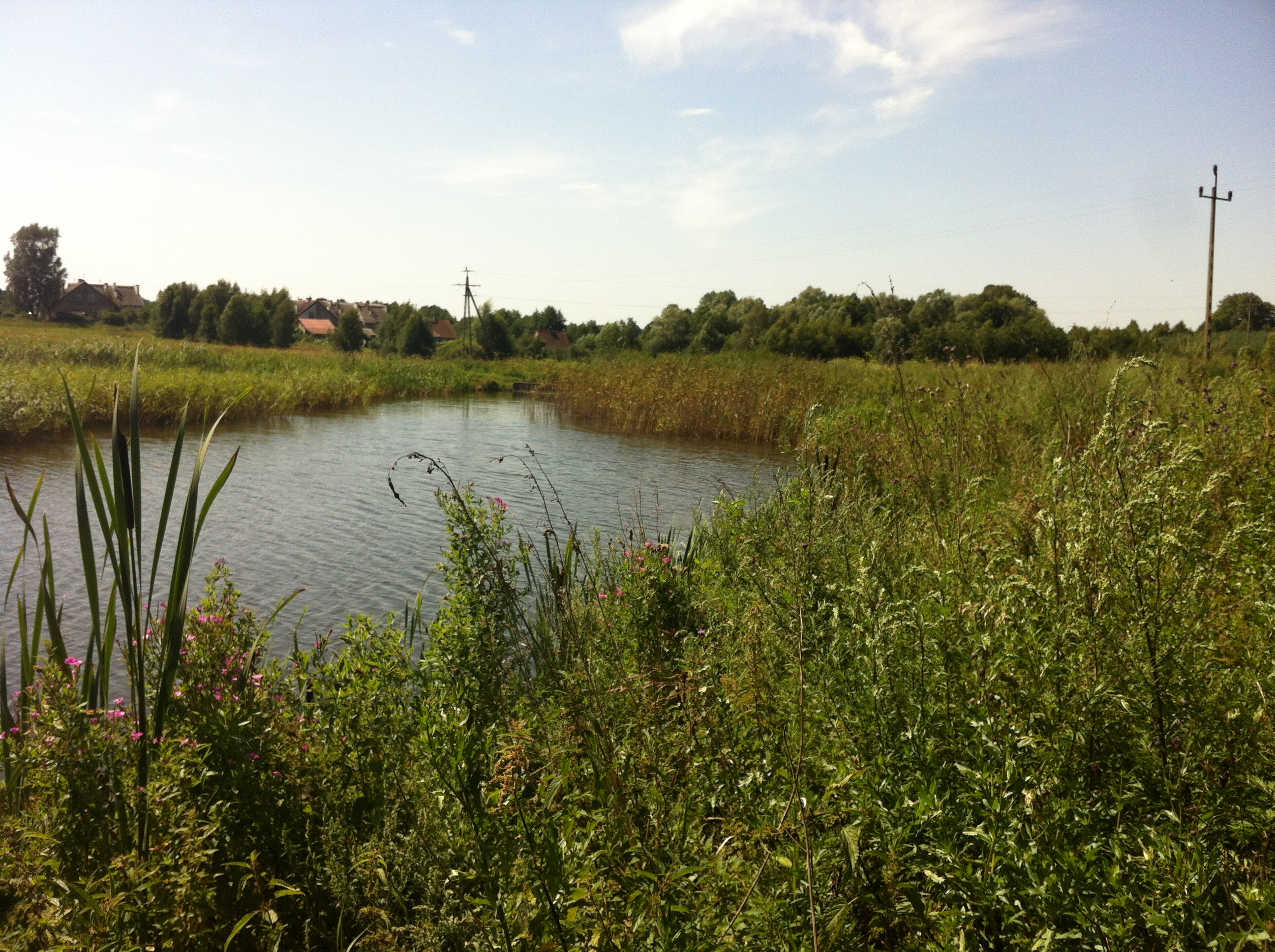
- A pond in Srokowski Dwór, a former Drengfurtshof farm

- Location within Poland
- Coordinates: 54°14′00″N 21°30′36″E
- Country: Poland
- Voivodeship: Warmian-Masurian
- County: Kętrzyn
- Gmina: Srokowo

Srokowski Dwór [srɔˈkɔfski ˈdvur] is a village in the administrative district of Gmina Srokowo, within Kętrzyn County, Warmian-Masurian Voivodeship, in northern Poland, close to the border with the Kaliningrad Oblast of Russia.
