= Goszczewo, Warmian-Masurian Voivodeship =

Goszczewo
- Village
- Location within Poland
- Coordinates: 54°18′50″N 21°26′40″E
- Country: Poland
- Voivodeship: Warmian-Masurian
- County: Kętrzyn
- Gmina: Srokowo

Goszczewo [ɡɔʂˈt͡ʂɛvɔ] is a village in the administrative district of Gmina Srokowo, within Kętrzyn County, Warmian-Masurian Voivodeship, in Northern Poland, close to the border with the Kaliningrad Oblast of Russia.

The postal code of Goszczewo is 11-420.
