= Nowa Różanka, Gmina Srokowo =

Nowa Różanka
- Settlement
- Location within Poland
- Coordinates: 54°08′45″N 21°26′46″E
- Country: Poland
- Voivodeship: Warmian-Masurian
- County: Kętrzyn
- Gmina: Srokowo

Nowa Różanka (Polish pronunciation: [ˈnɔva ruˈʐaŋka]) is a settlement in the administrative district of Gmina Srokowo, within Kętrzyn County, Warmian-Masurian Voivodeship, in northern Poland, close to the border with the Kaliningrad Oblast of Russia.
