= Złote Pole =

- Settlement
- Location within Poland
- Coordinates: 54°12′14″N 21°29′35″E
- Country: Poland
- Voivodeship: (Warmian–Masurian Voivodeship) Warmian-Masurian
- County: Kętrzyn
- Gmina: Srokowo

Złote Pole [ˈzwɔtɛ ˈpɔlɛ] is a settlement in the administrative district of Gmina Srokowo, within Kętrzyn County, Warmian-Masurian Voivodeship, in northern Poland, close to the border with the Kaliningrad Oblast of Russia.
