= Nemansky District =

Nemansky District Неманский район (Russian)
- District
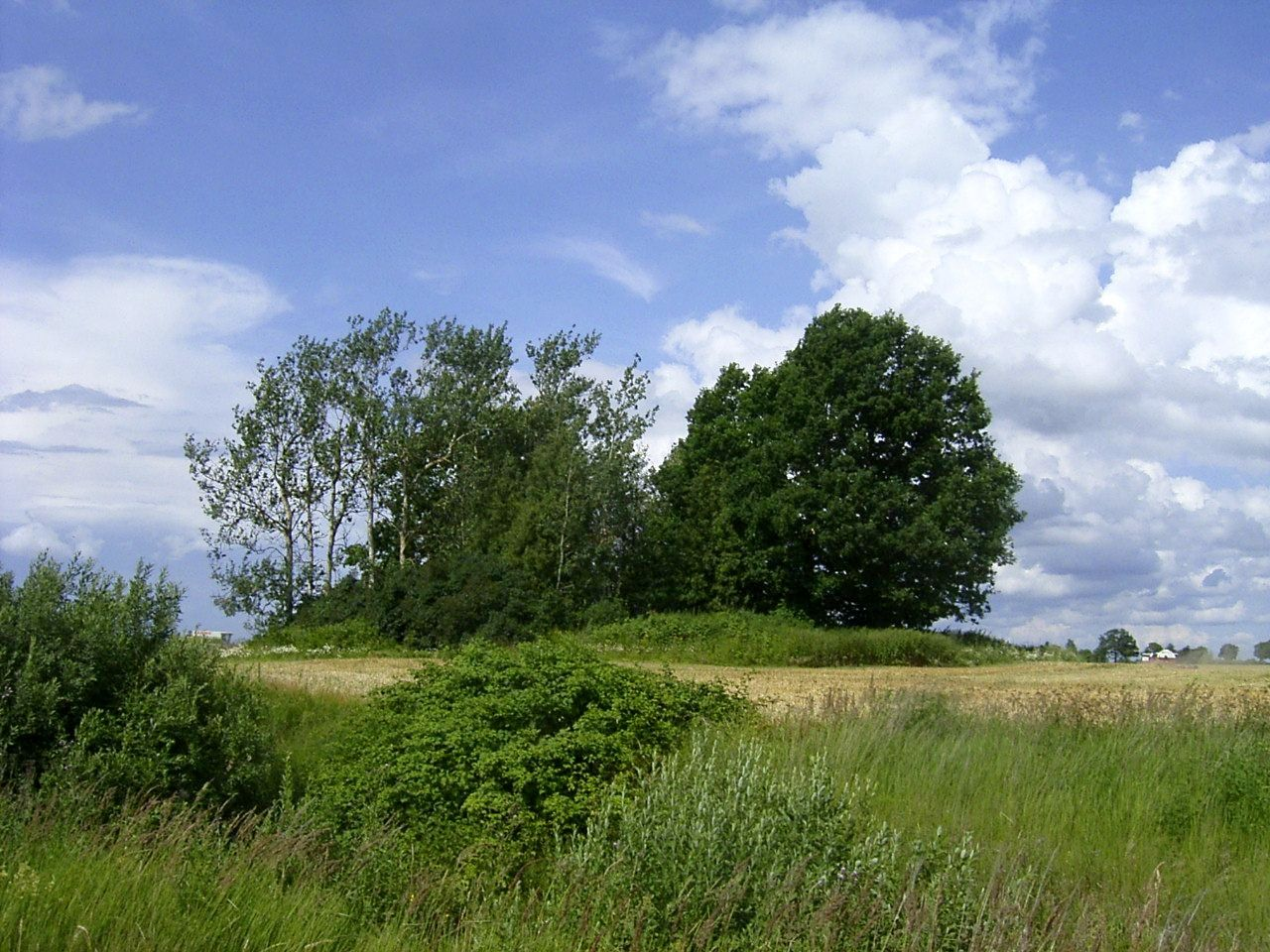
- Landscape in Nemansky District

- Flag Coat of arms
- Location of Nemansky District in Kaliningrad Oblast
- Coordinates: 54°02′N 22°02′E
- Country: Russia
- Federal subject: Kaliningrad Oblast
- Established: 7 April 1946
- Administrative center: Neman

Area
  - Total: 699.3 km^{2} (270.0 sq mi)

Population (2010 Census)
  - Total: 20,132
  - Density: 28.79/km^{2} (74.56/sq mi)
  - Urban: 58.6%
  - Rural: 41.4%

Administrative structure
  - Administrative divisions: 1 Towns of district significance, 2 Rural okrugs
  - Inhabited localities: 1 cities/towns, 49 rural localities

Municipal structure
  - Municipally incorporated as: Nemansky Municipal District
  - Municipal divisions: 1 urban settlements, 2 rural settlements
- Time zone: UTC+2 (MSK–1)
- OKTMO ID: 27621000
- Website: http://neman.gov39.ru/

Nemansky District (Russian: Нема́нский райо́н) is an administrative district (raion), one of the fifteen in Kaliningrad Oblast, Russia. As a municipal division, it is incorporated as Nemansky Municipal District. It is located in the north of the oblast. The area of the district is 699.3 square kilometers (270.0 sq mi). Its administrative center is the town of Neman. Population: 20,132 (2010 census); 22,536 (2002 Census); 8,904 (1989 Soviet census). The population of Neman accounts for 58.6% of the district's total population.

== Geography ==
The district borders Lithuania along the Neman River. It surrounds the town of Sovetsk, which is not a part of the district. The railway line from Chernyakhovsk to Sovetsk passes through the district, as well as a cargo line from Sovetsk to Neman, and the main road Kaliningrad–Talpaki–Sovetsk, which carries the major part of traffic to St. Petersburg via Lithuania and Latvia.

Nemansky District is sparsely populated; forests and steppe pasture-land prevail.
