= Julius Bacher =

German playwright and novelist

Julius Bacher (8 August 1810 – 1889) was a German playwright and novelist from Ragnit, Province of East Prussia.

== Biography ==
Bacher studied medicine in Königsberg, and settled there as a physician in 1837. After ten years, he abandoned his medical career to devote himself exclusively to literature. His first production in this field was a drama, Karl des XII. Erste Liebe (Charles XII's First Love). Then the political events of 1848 interrupted his literary activity, but he resumed it eight years later by publishing a novel, Sophie Charlotte, die Philosophische Königin, 3 vols. Its favorable reception by the public encouraged him to pursue literature, and he published successively: Die Brautschau Friedrich des Grossen (Frederick the Great's Search for a Bride; 1857), a drama; and Friedrich I. Letzte Tage (The Last Days of Frederick I; 1858), a romance in 3 vols. In 1859 his Charakterbild aus dem Leben was performed at the Royal Berlin Theater. Bacher thereupon settled in Berlin, whence he traveled to Switzerland and France. Upon his return to Berlin in 1860 he published three volumes of tales and a number of romances. The more celebrated of these works are: Ein Urteil Washington's, 2 vols., 1864; Sybilla von Kleve, 3 vols., 1865; Napoleon I. Letzte Liebe, 6 vols., 1868; Auf dem Wiener Kongress (On the Congress of Vienna), 4 vols., 1869; Prinzessin Sidonie, 3 vols., 1870; and the tragedies, Lady Seymour and Lucie.

== Sources ==
- A. de Gubernatis: Dictionnaire International des Ecrivains du Jour, Florence, 1891;
- Adolph Kohut: Berühmte Israelitische Männer und Frauen, 1901, xi. 89
