= Kąty, Kętrzyn County =

Kąty
- Village
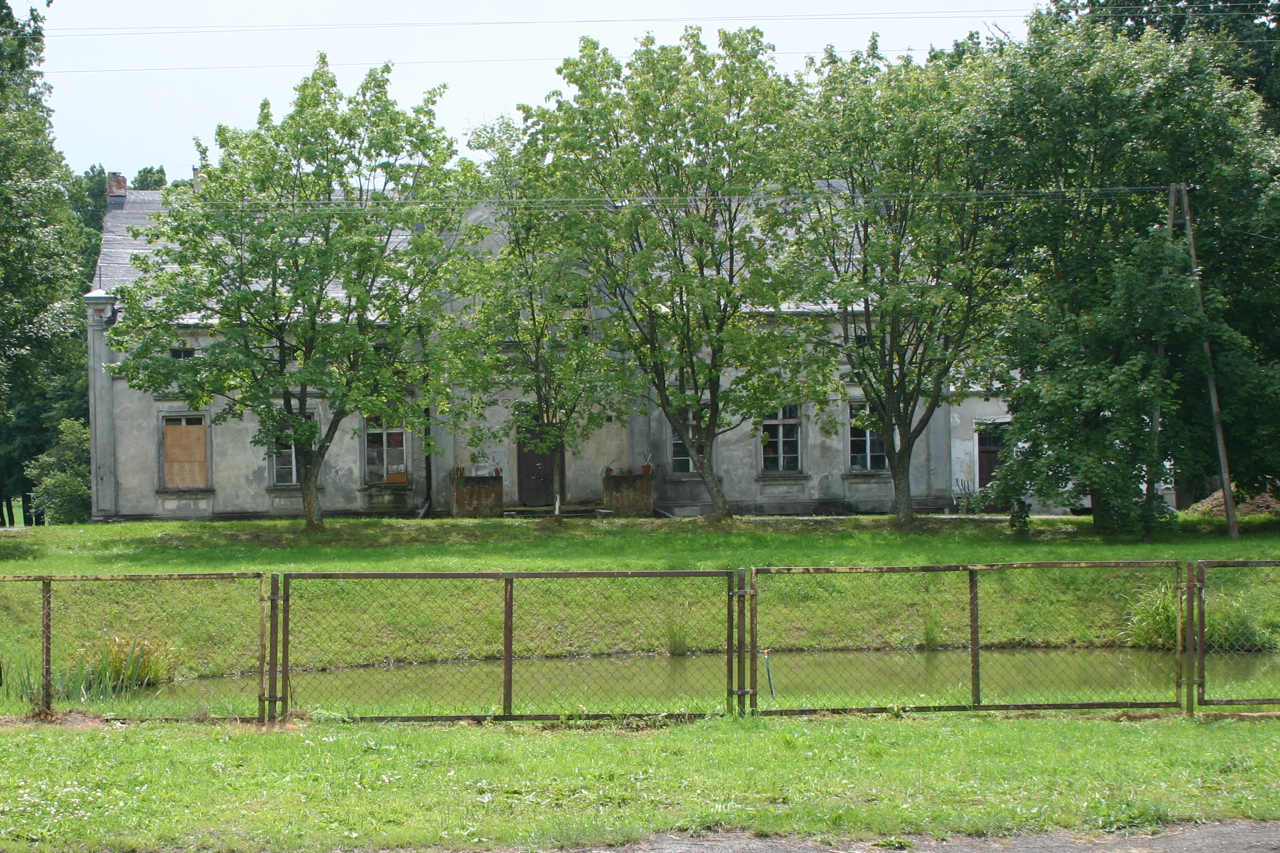
- Manor house in Kąty

- Location within Poland
- Coordinates: 54°08′52″N 21°28′52″E
- Country: Poland
- Voivodeship: Warmian-Masurian
- County: Kętrzyn
- Gmina: Srokowo

Kąty [ˈkɔntɨ] is a village in the administrative district of Gmina Srokowo, within Kętrzyn County, Warmian-Masurian Voivodeship, in northern Poland, close to the border with the Kaliningrad Oblast of Russia.
