= Rybakowo, Warmian-Masurian Voivodeship =

Rybakowo
- Settlement
- Location within Poland
- Coordinates: 54°11′9″N 21°31′37″E
- Country: Poland
- Voivodeship: Warmian-Masurian
- County: Kętrzyn
- Gmina: Srokowo

Rybakowo [rɨbaˈkɔvɔ] is a settlement in the administrative district of Gmina Srokowo, within Kętrzyn County, Warmian-Masurian Voivodeship, in northern Poland, close to the border with the Kaliningrad Oblast of Russia.
