= Leśniewo, Warmian-Masurian Voivodeship =

Leśniewo
- Village
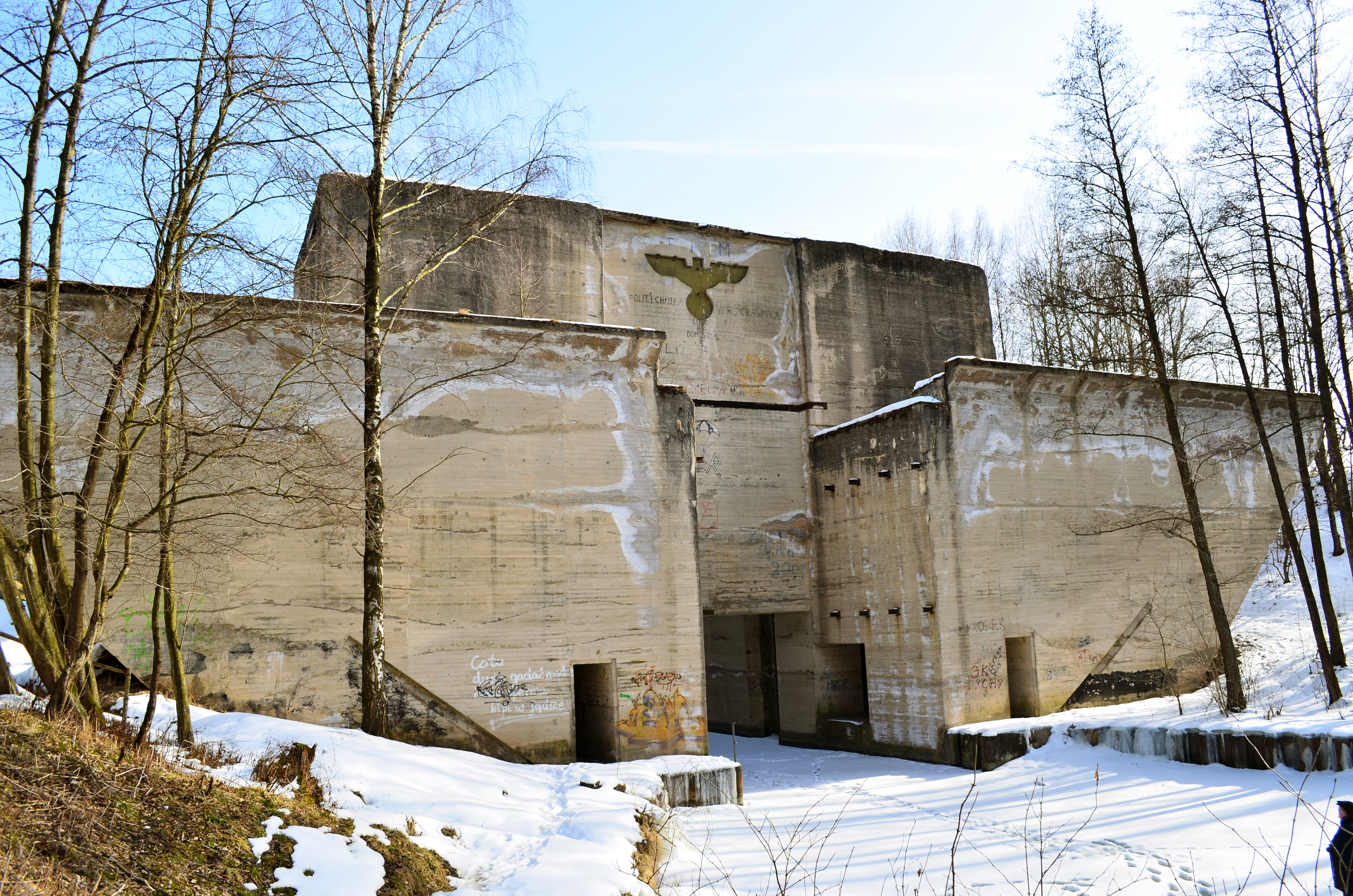
- Upper Lesniewo sluice. The location where the emblem of the Third Reich used to be visible at the top.

- Location within Poland
- Coordinates: 54°12′50″N 21°33′31″E
- Country: Poland
- Voivodeship: Warmian-Masurian
- County: Kętrzyn
- Gmina: Srokowo
- Population: 330
- Time zone: UTC+1 (CET)
  - Summer (DST): UTC+2 (CEST)
- Vehicle registration: NKE

Leśniewo [lɛɕˈɲɛvɔ] is a village in the administrative district of Gmina Srokowo, within Kętrzyn County, Warmian-Masurian Voivodeship, in northern Poland, close to the border with the Kaliningrad Oblast of Russia.

To the northwest of the village there is Diabla Góra. To the west of the village there is the Masurian Canal, near the village there are two unfinished sluices: Leśniewo Górne and Leśniewo Dolne. Both were constructed during the period of German Empire in 1906 and continued in the Nazi Germany period in the 1940s. Because of both World Wars, both attempts did not manage to finish those sluices. A legend says that they were to be used for U-boats that would sail for repairs through the canal inland or for barges. It is not known what would they be used for exactly. They are about 45 meters long in their current state. Had it been finished it could have been larger. Today it is a tourist attraction.
