= Mazurkowo =

- Settlement
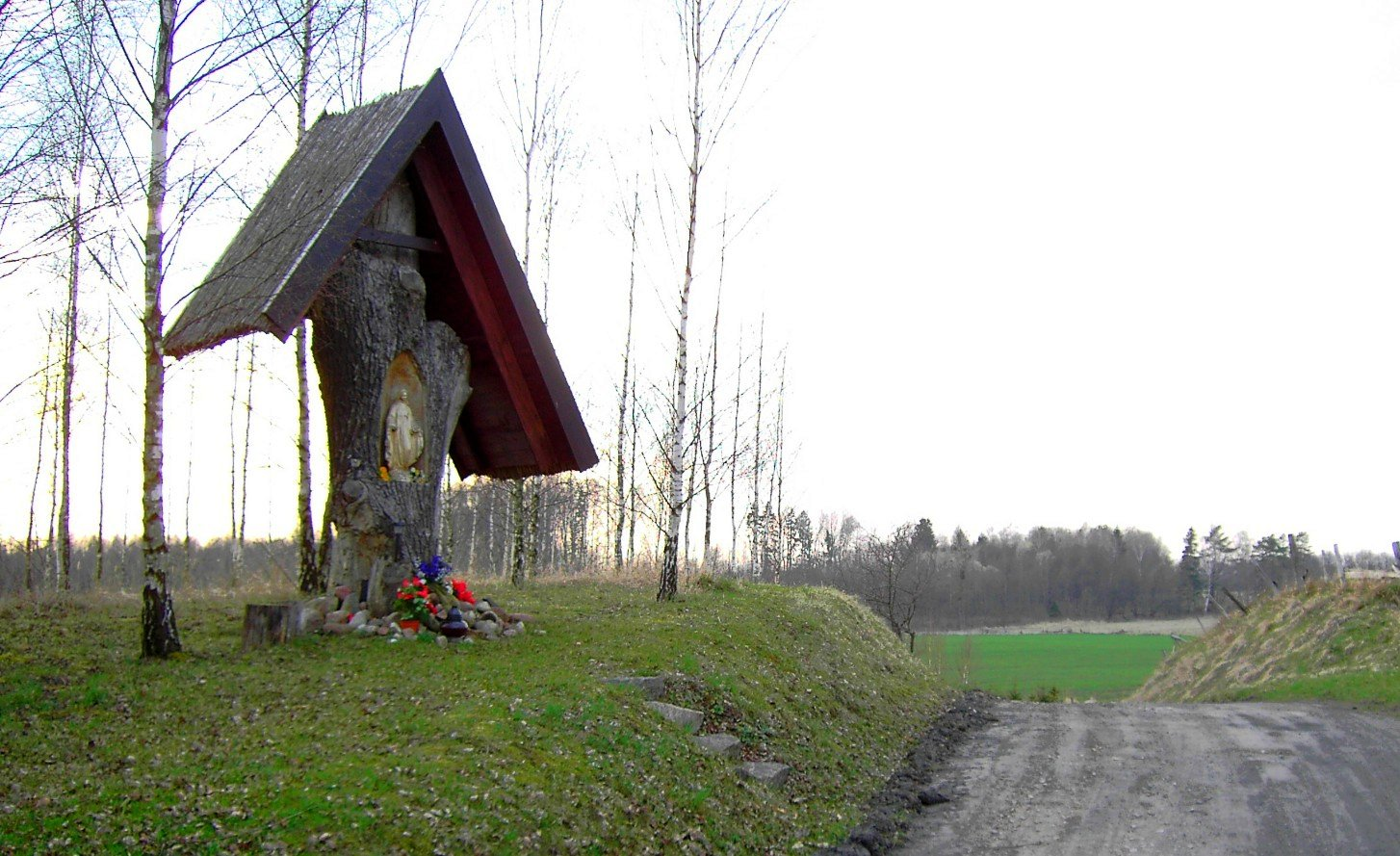
- A chapel in Mazurków

- Location within Poland
- Coordinates: 54°17′43″N 21°33′11″E
- Country: Poland
- Voivodeship: Warmian-Masurian
- County: Kętrzyn
- Gmina: Srokowo

Mazurkowo [mazurˈkɔvɔ] is a settlement in the administrative district of Gmina Srokowo, within Kętrzyn County, Warmian-Masurian Voivodeship, in northern Poland, close to the border with the Kaliningrad Oblast of Russia.
