= Siemkowo, Warmian-Masurian Voivodeship =

Siemkowo
- Village
- Location within Poland
- Coordinates: 54°9′47″N 21°33′55″E
- Country: Poland
- Voivodeship: Warmian-Masurian
- County: Kętrzyn
- Gmina: Srokowo

Siemkowo [ɕɛmˈkɔvɔ] is a village in the administrative district of Gmina Srokowo, within Kętrzyn County, Warmian-Masurian Voivodeship, in northern Poland, close to the border with the Kaliningrad Oblast of Russia.
