= Siniec, Warmian-Masurian Voivodeship =

Siniec
- Village
- Location within Poland
- Coordinates: 54°8′28″N 21°30′16″E
- Country: Poland
- Voivodeship: Warmian-Masurian
- County: Kętrzyn
- Gmina: Srokowo

Siniec [ˈɕiɲɛt͡s] is a village in the administrative district of Gmina Srokowo, within Kętrzyn County, Warmian-Masurian Voivodeship, in northern Poland, close to the border with the Kaliningrad Oblast of Russia.
