= Marszałki, Warmian-Masurian Voivodeship =

Marszałki
- Village
- Location within Poland
- Coordinates: 54°16′39″N 21°33′13″E
- Country: Poland
- Voivodeship: Warmian-Masurian
- County: Kętrzyn
- Gmina: Srokowo

Marszałki [marˈʂau̯ki] is a village in the administrative district of Gmina Srokowo, within Kętrzyn County, Warmian-Masurian Voivodeship, in northern Poland, close to the border with the Kaliningrad Oblast of Russia.
