= Srokowo =

- Village
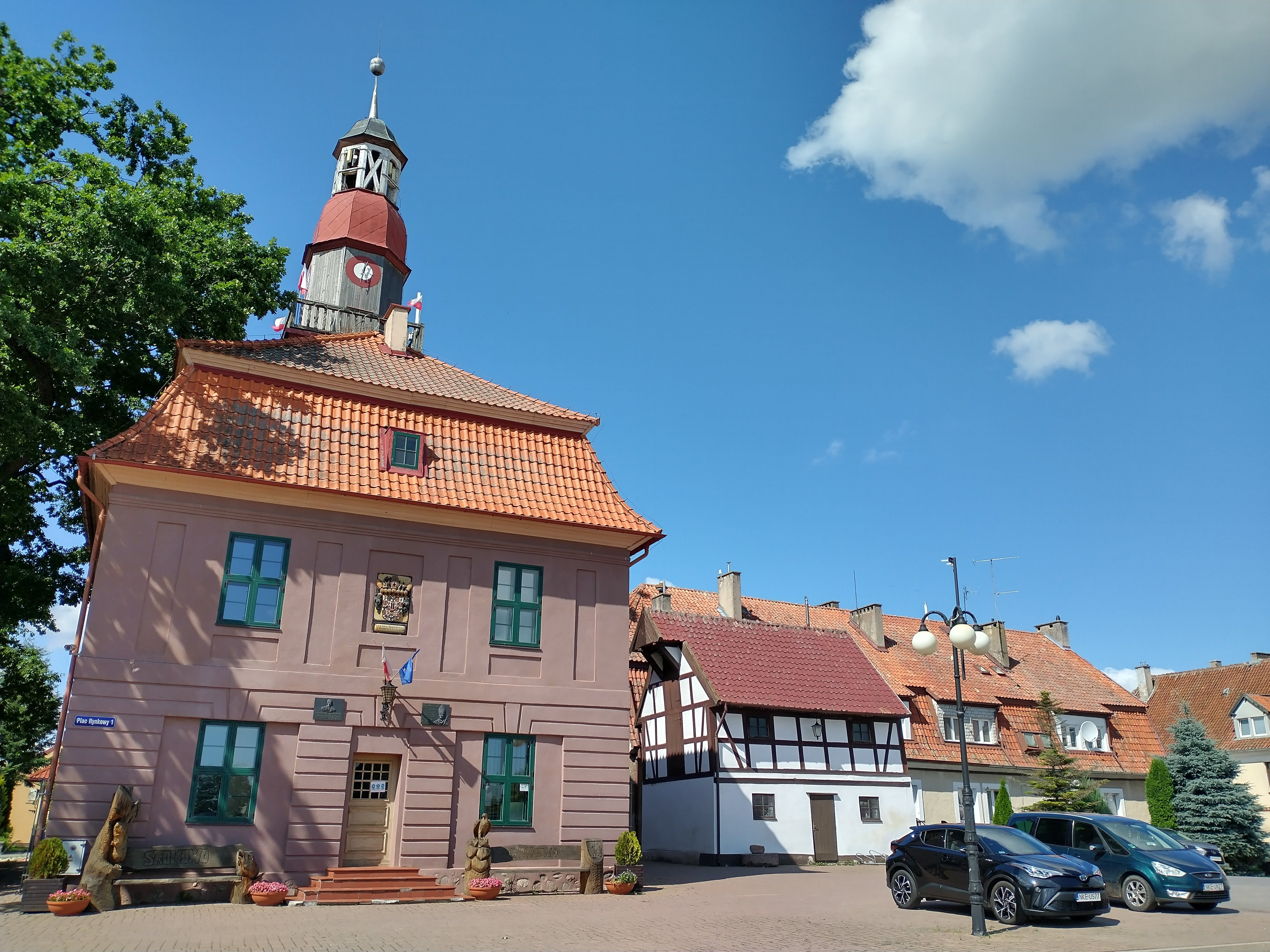
- Baroque Town hall and granary

- Location within Poland
- Coordinates: 54°12′49″N 21°31′14″E
- Country: Poland
- Voivodeship: Warmian-Masurian
- County: Kętrzyn
- Gmina: Srokowo

Population
  - Total: 1,400
- Time zone: UTC+1 (CET)
  - Summer (DST): UTC+2 (CEST)
- Vehicle registration: NKE

Srokowo [srɔˈkɔvɔ] (until 1946 Dryfort, German: Drengfurth) is a village in Kętrzyn County, Warmian-Masurian Voivodeship, in northern Poland, close to the border with the Kaliningrad Oblast of Russia. It is the seat of the gmina (administrative district) called Gmina Srokowo. It is located in Masuria.

== History ==
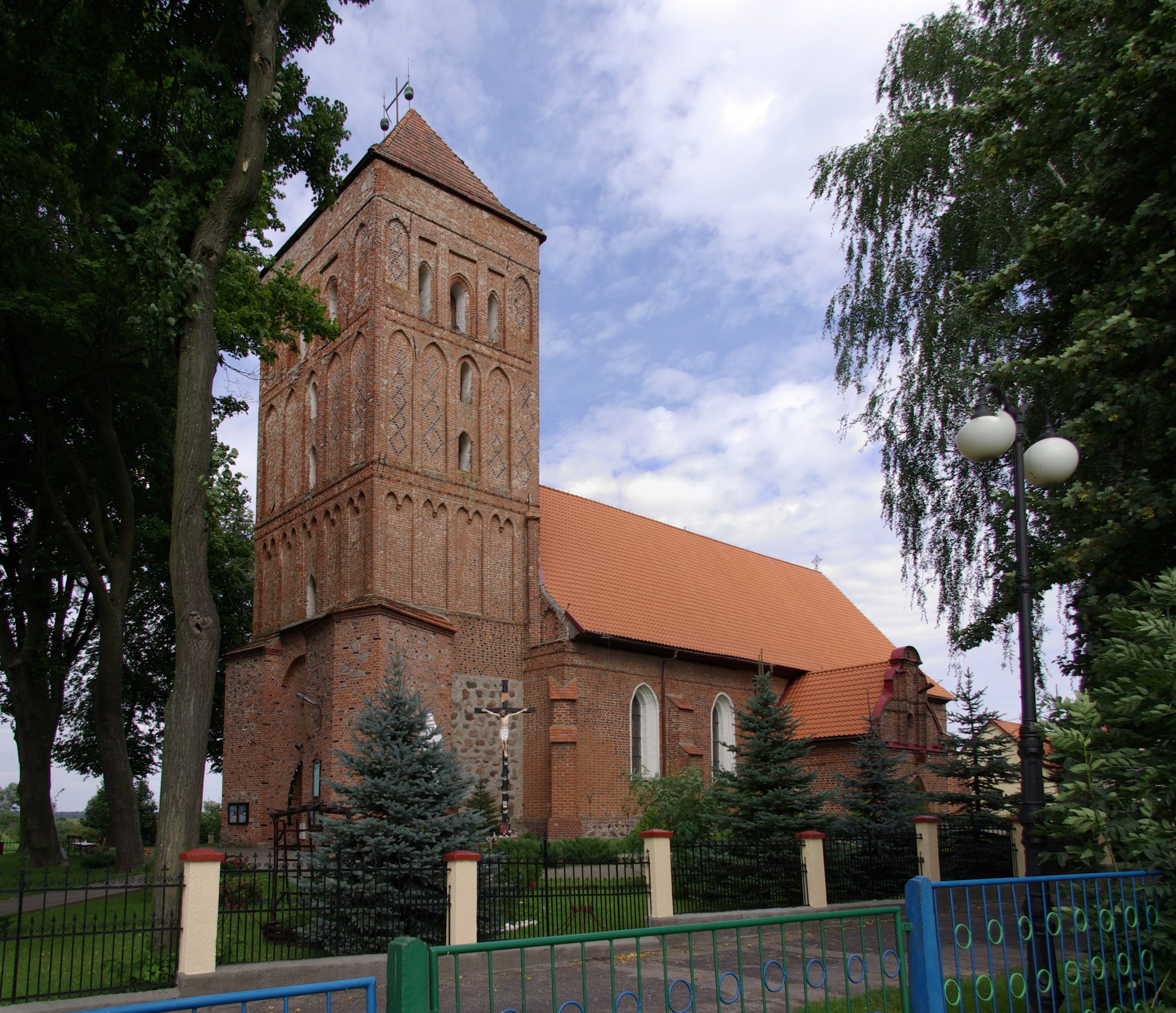
Gothic Church of the Holy Cross

The settlement was founded sometime before 1397 with a grid plan. In 1405 it received town privileges modeled on the city law of Chełmno by the Grand Master of the Teutonic Order Konrad von Jungingen. During the Middle Ages the town defences consisted of palisades, a dry moat and three gates. In 1454, King Casimir IV Jagiellon incorporated the region to the Kingdom of Poland upon the request of the anti-Teutonic Prussian Confederation. After the subsequent Thirteen Years' War (1454–1466), it became a part of Poland as a fief held by the Teutonic Knights. Construction of the church was finished in 1409 and renovated in 1577. A school was founded in the town in 1592.

A privilege of protection was proclaimed for the town in 1618 by Elector John Sigismund, whose coat of arms can still be seen on the facade of the town hall. The town was severely damaged in 1635 during the Thirty Years' War and almost completely destroyed by Tatar troops in 1657 during the Deluge. Because of its location, the town never grew to become very large and continued to be populated mainly by farmers and artisans also during the 18th and 19th centuries. From the 18th century it was part of the Kingdom of Prussia, and from 1871 it was also part of Germany. The Polish parish still existed in the late 18th century. Eight annual fairs were held in the town in the late 19th century.

After Germany's defeat in World War II, the town became again part of Poland under its historic Polish name Dryfort. It was renamed Srokowo in 1946, after Stanisław Srokowski, the head of the Polish Committee for Settling of Place Names. There is an abandoned Bismarck tower that can be visited on the hill just outside of the village.

== Demographics ==
Historical population

Year	Pop.	±%
1843	1,743	—
1871	1,971	+13.1%
1880	1,842	−6.5%
1890	1,693	−8.1%

Year	Pop.	±%
1900	1,511	−10.8%
1910	1,521	+0.7%
1925	1,571	+3.3%
1933	1,588	+1.1%
