= Dobrocin, Warmian-Masurian Voivodeship =

Dobrocin
- Village
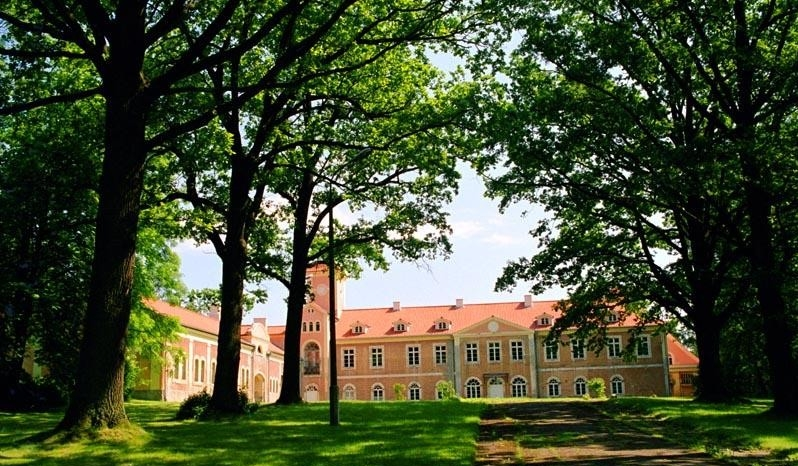

- Location within Poland
- Coordinates: 53°54′29″N 19°50′11″E
- Country: Poland
- Voivodeship: Warmian-Masurian
- County: Ostróda
- Gmina: Małdyty
- Population: 950

Dobrocin [dɔˈbrɔt͡ɕin] is a village in the administrative district of Gmina Małdyty, within Ostróda County, Warmian-Masurian Voivodeship, in northern Poland.

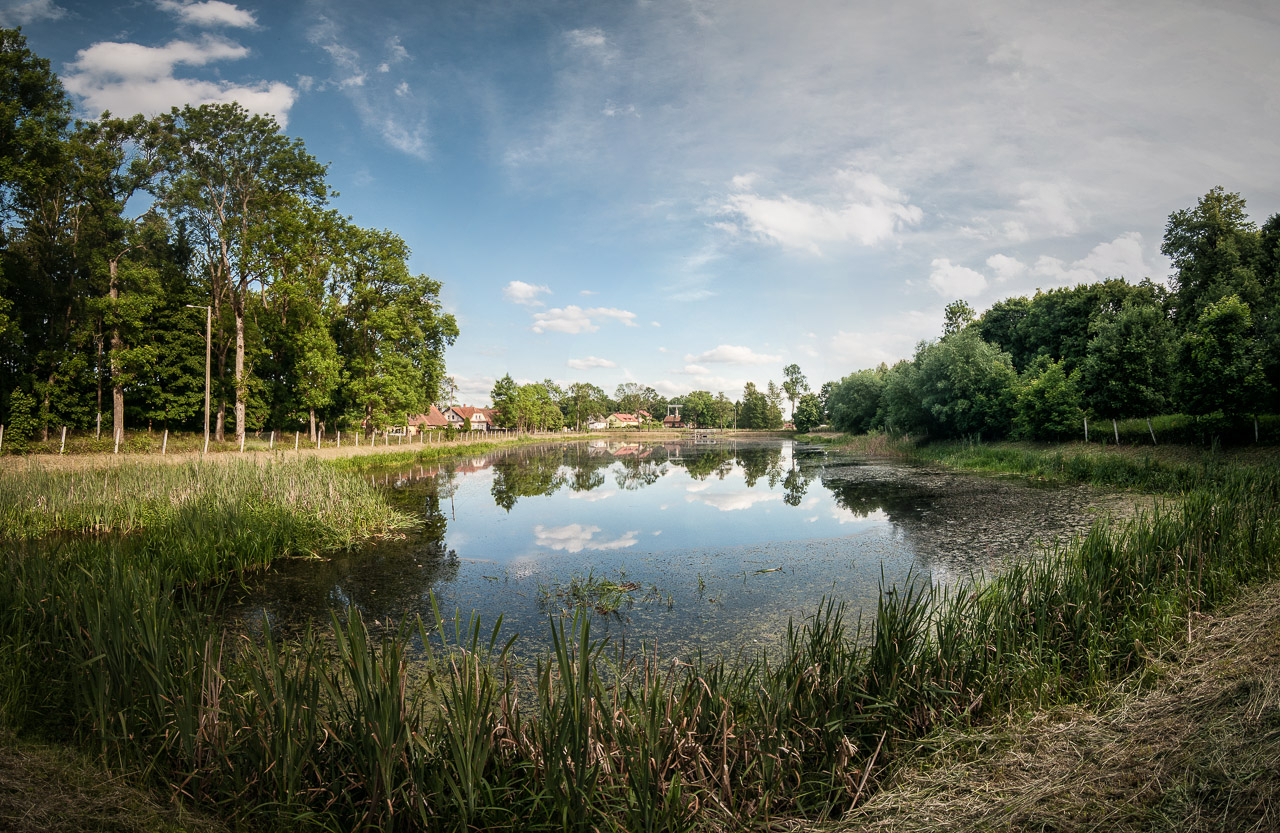
Dobrocin pond

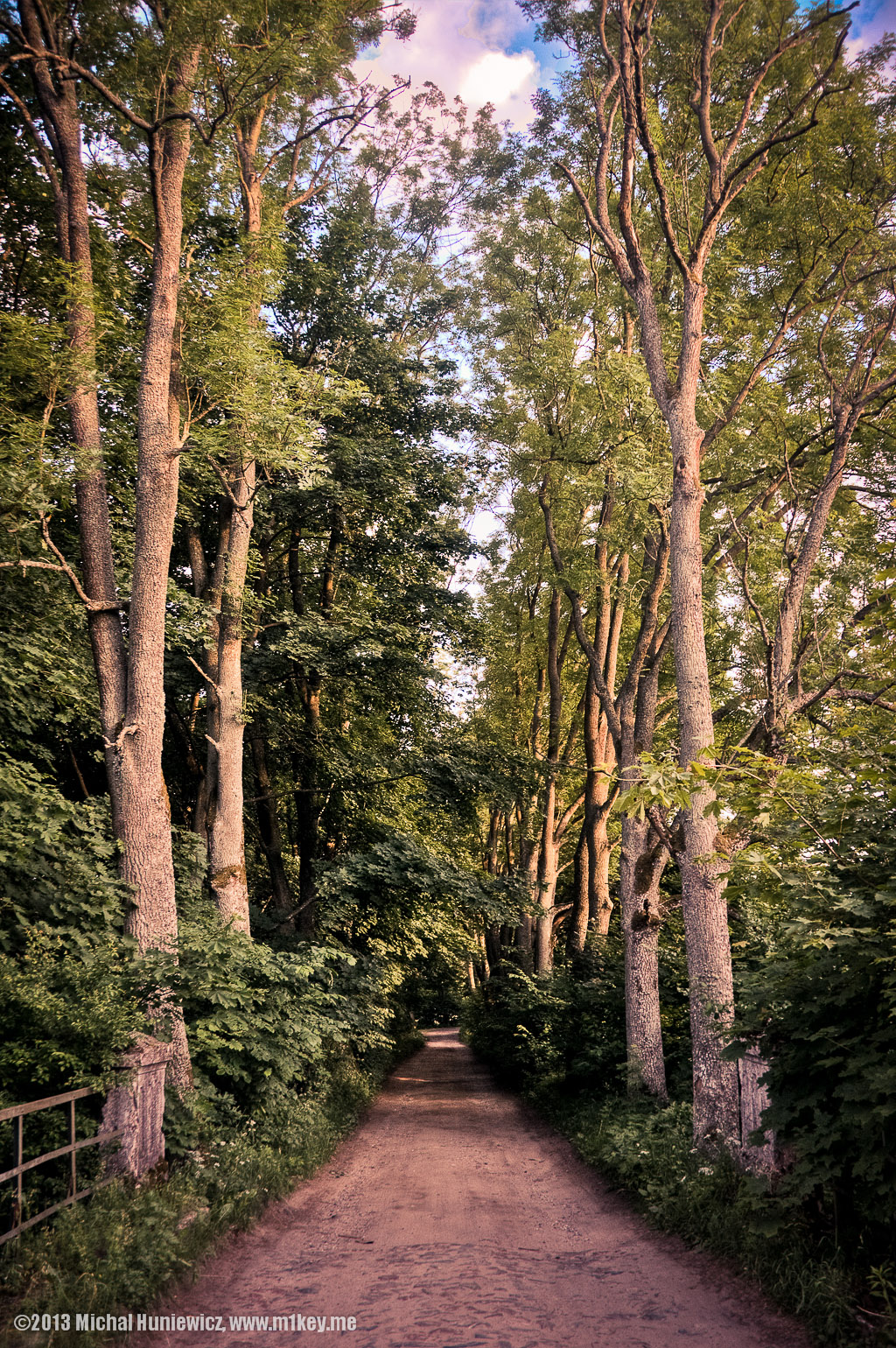
Forest road in Dobrocin

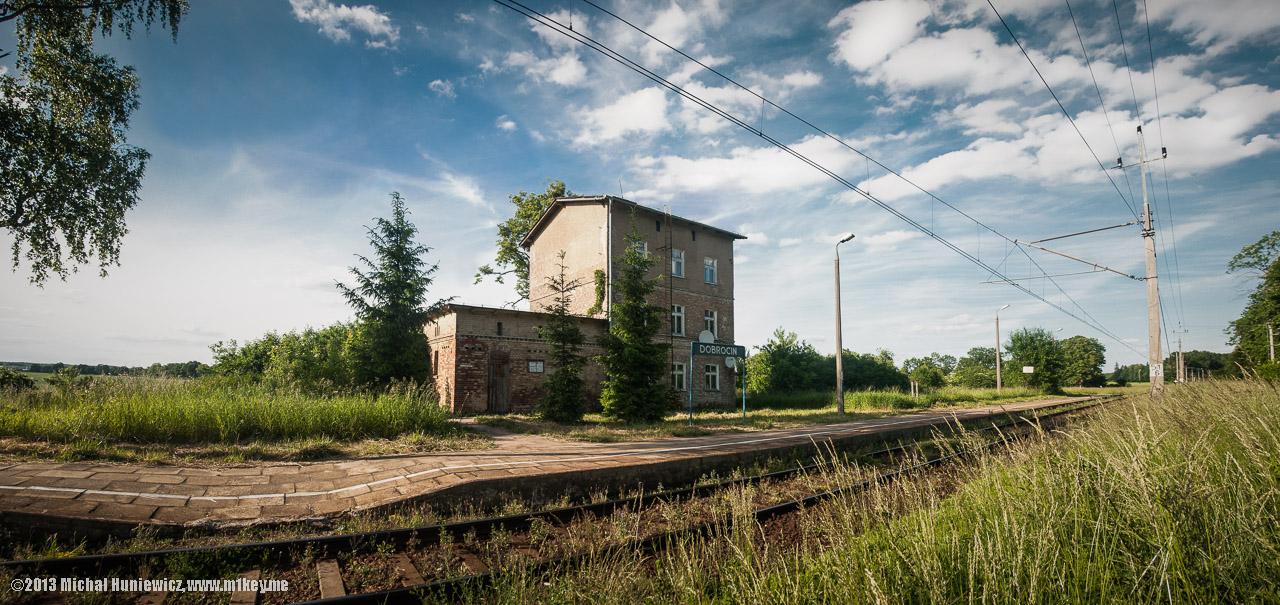
Dobrocin train stop

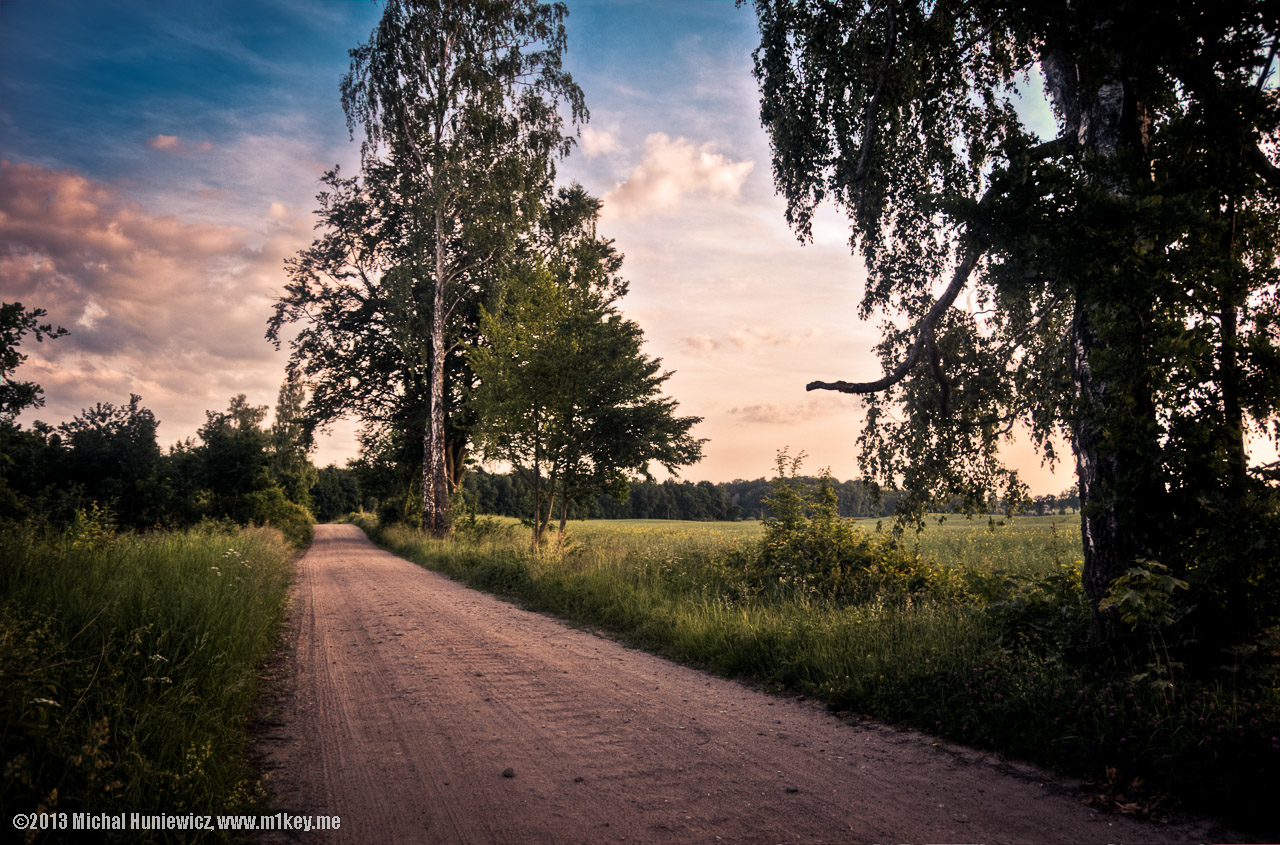
The dirt track from Dobrocin to Dobrocinek
