= Gmina Srokowo =

Gmina Srokowo Srokowo Commune
- Gmina
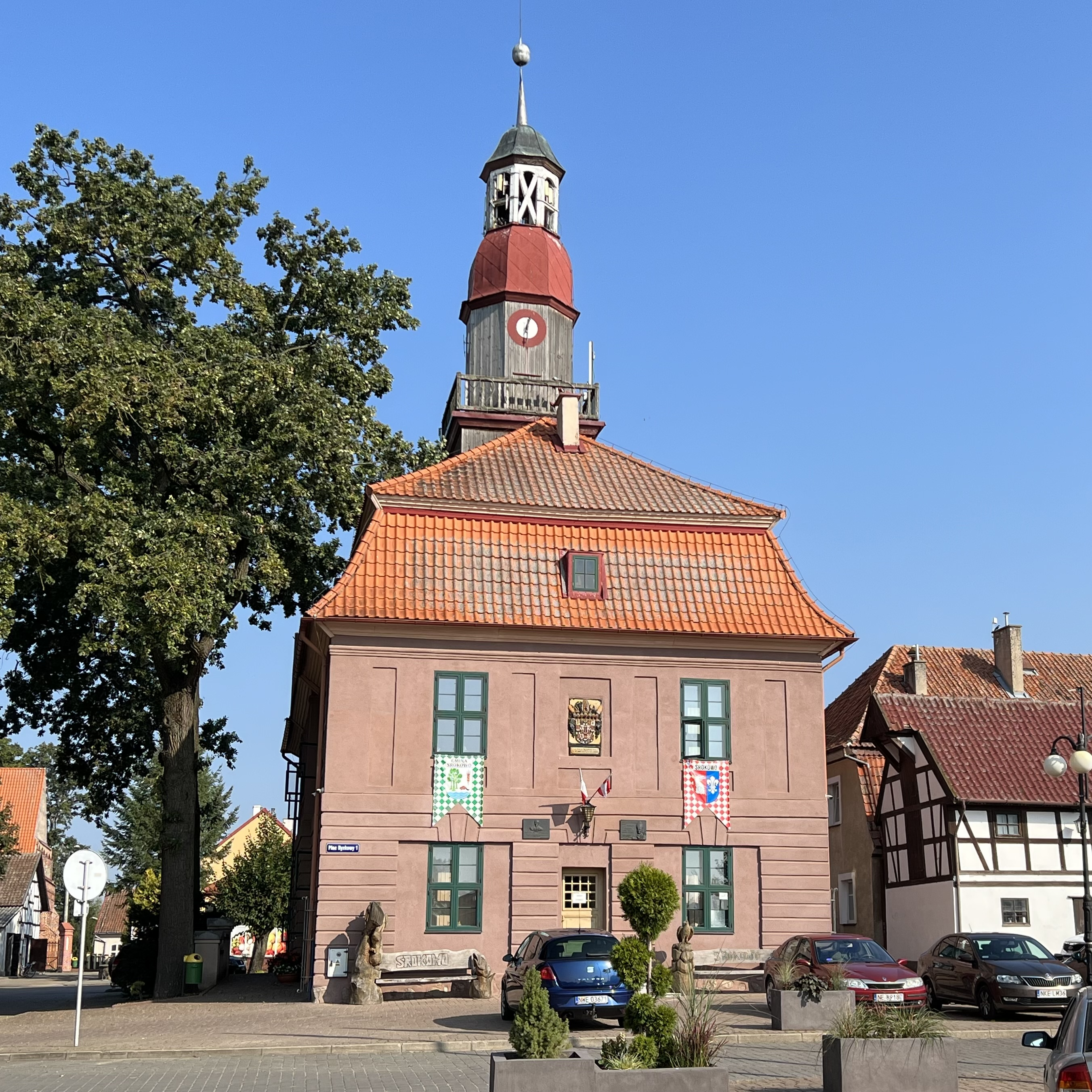
- Gmina office in Srokowo

- Coat of arms
- Interactive map of Gmina Srokowo
- Coordinates (Srokowo): 54°12′49″N 21°31′14″E
- Country: Poland
- Voivodeship: Warmian-Masurian
- County: Kętrzyn
- Seat: Srokowo

Area
  - Total: 194.63 km^{2} (75.15 sq mi)

Population (2006)
  - Total: 4,249
  - Density: 21.83/km^{2} (56.54/sq mi)
- Time zone: UTC+1 (CET)
  - Summer (DST): UTC+2 (CEST)
- Vehicle registration: NKE
- Website: http://www.srokowo.iaw.pl

Gmina Srokowo is a rural gmina (administrative district) in Kętrzyn County, Warmian-Masurian Voivodeship, in northern Poland, on the border with Russia. Its seat is the village of Srokowo, which lies approximately 17 kilometres (11 mi) north-east of Kętrzyn and 83 km (52 mi) north-east of the regional capital Olsztyn.

The gmina covers an area of 194.63 square kilometres (75.1 sq mi), and as of 2006 its total population is 4,249.

== Villages ==
Gmina Srokowo contains the villages and settlements of Bajorki, Bajorski Gaj, Bajory Małe, Bajory Wielkie, Brzeźnica, Chojnica, Dolny Siniec, Goszczewo, Jankowice, Jegławki, Jegławki-Osada, Kaczory, Kałki, Kąty, Kolkiejmy, Kosakowo, Księży Dwór, Łęknica, Lesieniec, Łęsk, Leśniewo, Leśny Rów, Lipowo, Marszałki, Mazurkowo, Mintowo, Młynowo, Niedziały, Nowa Różanka, Osikowo, Pieczarki, Podlasie, Pyszki, Różanka-Leśniczówka, Rybakowo, Rypławki, Siemkowo, Silec, Silecki Folwark, Sińczyk-Leśniczówka, Siniec, Siniec-Cegielnia, Skandławki, Solanka, Sówka, Srokowo, Srokowski Dwór, Stare Jegławki, Suchodoły, Szczeciniak, Wikrowo, Wilcza Wólka, Wilcze, Wilczyny, Wólka Jankowska, Wyskok, Wysoka Góra and Złote Pole.

== Neighbouring gminas ==
Gmina Srokowo is bordered by the gminas of Barciany, Kętrzyn and Węgorzewo. It also borders Russia (Kaliningrad oblast).
