= Łęsk =

- Settlement
- Location within Poland
- Coordinates: 54°13′16″N 21°26′0″E
- Country: Poland
- Voivodeship: Warmian-Masurian
- County: Kętrzyn
- Gmina: Srokowo

Łęsk [wɛ̃sk] is a settlement in the administrative district of Gmina Srokowo, within Kętrzyn County, Warmian-Masurian Voivodeship, in northern Poland, close to the border with the Kaliningrad Oblast of Russia.
