= Pieczarki, Kętrzyn County =

Pieczarki
- Village
- Location within Poland
- Coordinates: 54°13′54″N 21°33′09″E
- Country: Poland
- Voivodeship: Warmian-Masurian
- County: Kętrzyn
- Gmina: Srokowo

Pieczarki [pjɛˈt͡ʂarki] is a village in the administrative district of Gmina Srokowo, within Kętrzyn County, Warmian-Masurian Voivodeship, in northern Poland, close to the border with the Kaliningrad Oblast of Russia.
