= Trygort =

- Village
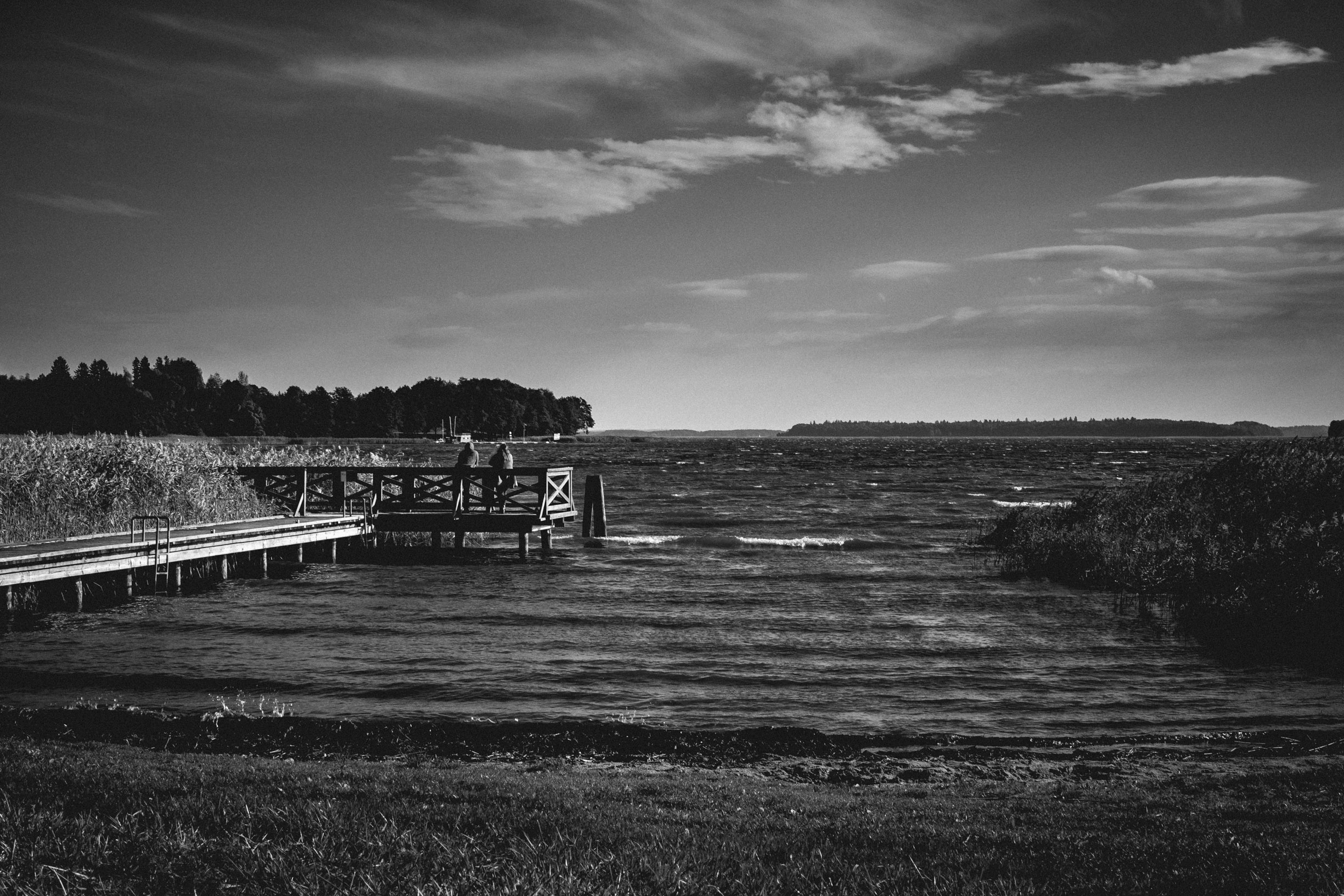

- Location within Poland
- Coordinates: 54°13′N 21°41′E
- Country: Poland
- Voivodeship: Warmian-Masurian
- County: Węgorzewo
- Gmina: Węgorzewo
- Founded: 1452
- Time zone: UTC+1 (CET)
  - Summer (DST): UTC+2 (CEST)
- Vehicle registration: NWE

Trygort [ˈtrɨɡɔrt] (German: Thiergarten) is a village in the administrative district of Gmina Węgorzewo, within Węgorzewo County, Warmian-Masurian Voivodeship, in north-eastern Poland. It is located on the northern shore of Lake Mamry in the region of Masuria, close to the border with the Kaliningrad Oblast of Russia.

The village was founded in 1452. Błażej Krasiński, starost of Przasnysz, lived in the village.
