= Kamionek Wielki, Węgorzewo County =

Kamionek Wielki
- Village
- Location within Poland
- Coordinates: 54°9′N 21°38′E
- Country: Poland
- Voivodeship: Warmian-Masurian
- County: Węgorzewo
- Gmina: Węgorzewo

Kamionek Wielki (Polish pronunciation: [kaˈmjɔnɛk ˈfjɛlkʲi]; German: Ziegelei Steinort) is a village in the administrative district of Gmina Węgorzewo, within Węgorzewo County, Warmian-Masurian Voivodeship, in northern Poland, near the border with the Kaliningrad Oblast of Russia. It is situated approximately 11 km (7 mi) south-west of Węgorzewo and 85 km (53 mi) north-east of the regional capital Olsztyn.
