= Kietlice, Warmian-Masurian Voivodeship =

Kietlice
- Settlement
- Location within Poland
- Coordinates: 54°09′25″N 21°39′27″E
- Country: Poland
- Voivodeship: Warmian-Masurian
- County: Węgorzewo
- Gmina: Węgorzewo
- Time zone: UTC+1 (CET)
  - Summer (DST): UTC+2 (CEST)
- Vehicle registration: NWE

Kietlice [kʲɛˈtlit͡sɛ] (German: Kittlitz) is a settlement in the administrative district of Gmina Węgorzewo, within Węgorzewo County, Warmian-Masurian Voivodeship, in north-eastern Poland. It is located on the western shore of Lake Mamry in the region of Masuria, close to the border with the Kaliningrad Oblast of Russia.

For centuries, it remained an ethnically Polish village, and as of 1719, it had an exclusively Polish population.
