= Suczki, Węgorzewo County =

Suczki
- Village
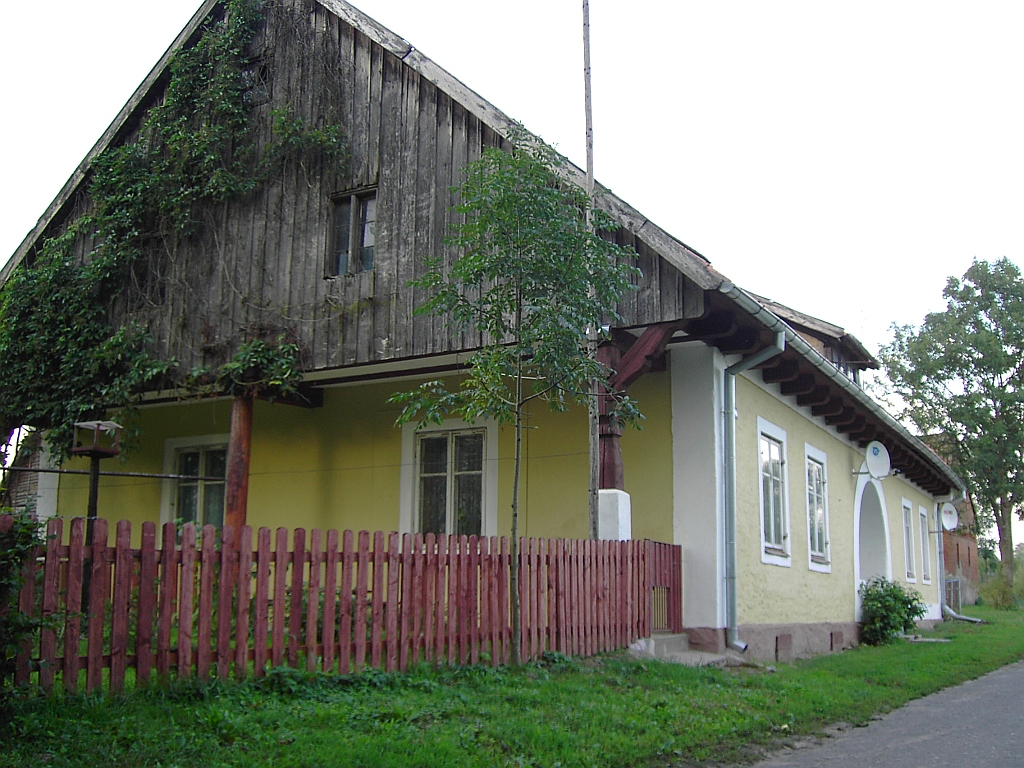

- Location within Poland
- Coordinates: 54°18′53″N 21°40′32″E
- Country: Poland
- Voivodeship: Warmian-Masurian
- County: Węgorzewo
- Gmina: Węgorzewo
- Time zone: UTC+1 (CET)
  - Summer (DST): UTC+2 (CEST)
- Vehicle registration: NWE

Suczki [ˈsut͡ʂki] is a village in the administrative district of Gmina Węgorzewo, within Węgorzewo County, Warmian-Masurian Voivodeship, in north-eastern Poland. It is located in Masuria.

The village was founded by Polish people.
