= Macki =

Macki may refer to:

- Mački, Slovenia, a village near Velike Lašče
- Mački, Croatia, a village near Farkaševac
- Maćki, a village in Poland
- Stephen "Macki" Mackintosh, a fictional character in Hollyoaks soap opera

== See also ==
- Mackie (disambiguation)
