= Mamerki =

- Settlement
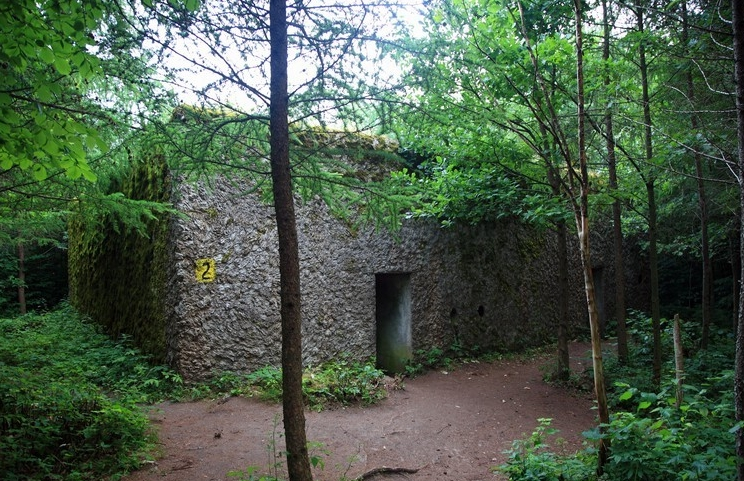
- Former headquarters of the Supreme Command of the Land Forces (OKH) in Mamerki

- Location within Poland
- Coordinates: 54°11′23″N 21°39′05″E
- Country: Poland
- Voivodeship: Warmian-Masurian
- County: Węgorzewo
- Gmina: Węgorzewo
- Time zone: UTC+01:00 (CET)
  - Summer (DST): UTC+02:00 (CEST)
- Vehicle registration: NWE

Mamerki [maˈmɛrki] (German: Mauerwald) is a settlement in the administrative district of Gmina Węgorzewo, within Węgorzewo County, Warmian-Masurian Voivodeship, in north-eastern Poland. It is located in the historic region of Masuria, at the point where the Masurian Canal and Lake Mamry meet.

It is located near the town of Węgorzewo and close to the border with the Kaliningrad Oblast of Russia.

A bunker complex, former headquarters of the Supreme Command of the Land Forces (OKH) from World War II, is located in Mamerki. Now it houses a museum.
