= Kal, Poland =

Kal
- Village
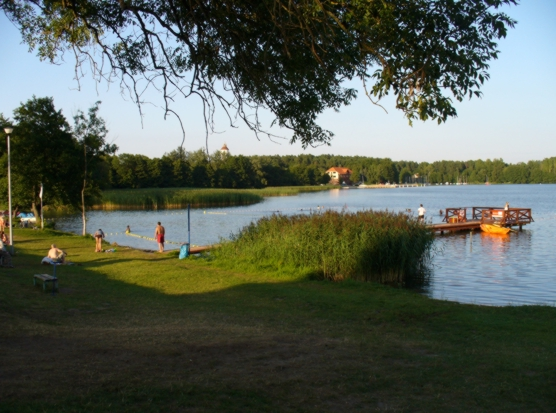

- Location within Poland
- Coordinates: 54°10′N 21°44′E
- Country: Poland
- Voivodeship: Warmian-Masurian
- County: Węgorzewo
- Gmina: Węgorzewo
- Elevation: 150 m (490 ft)
- Population: 150
- Time zone: UTC+1 (CET)
  - Summer (DST): UTC+2 (CEST)
- Vehicle registration: NWE

Kal [kal] (German: Kehlen) is a village in the administrative district of Gmina Węgorzewo, within Węgorzewo County, Warmian-Masurian Voivodeship, in northern Poland, close to the border with the Kaliningrad Oblast of Russia. It is located between lakes Mamry and Święcajty in the historic region of Masuria.

The village has a population of 150.
