= Kolonia Rybacka =

- Village
- Location within Poland
- Coordinates: 54°11′10″N 21°47′35″E
- Country: Poland
- Voivodeship: Warmian-Masurian
- County: Węgorzewo
- Gmina: Węgorzewo
- Time zone: UTC+01:00 (CET)
  - Summer (DST): UTC+02:00 (CEST)

Kolonia Rybacka [kɔˈlɔɲa rɨˈbat͡ska] is a village in the administrative district of Gmina Węgorzewo, within Węgorzewo County, Warmian-Masurian Voivodeship, in northern Poland, close to the border with the Kaliningrad Oblast of Russia.
