= Wilkowo, Węgorzewo County =

Wilkowo
- Village
- Location within Poland
- Coordinates: 54°17′N 21°44′E
- Country: Poland
- Voivodeship: Warmian-Masurian
- County: Węgorzewo
- Gmina: Węgorzewo

Wilkowo [vilˈkɔvɔ] (German: Wilkowen, 1938-1945 Geroldswalde) is a village in the administrative district of Gmina Węgorzewo, within Węgorzewo County, Warmian-Masurian Voivodeship, in northern Poland, close to the border with the Kaliningrad Oblast of Russia.
