= Biedaszki, Węgorzewo County =

Biedaszki
- Village
- Location within Poland
- Coordinates: 54°16′32″N 21°37′50″E
- Country: Poland
- Voivodeship: Warmian-Masurian
- County: Węgorzewo
- Gmina: Węgorzewo
- Founded: 1558
- Time zone: UTC+1 (CET)
  - Summer (DST): UTC+2 (CEST)
- Vehicle registration: NWE

Biedaszki [bjɛˈdaʂki] (German: Biedaschken) is a village in the administrative district of Gmina Węgorzewo, within Węgorzewo County, Warmian-Masurian Voivodeship, in north-eastern Poland. It is located in the region of Masuria, close to the border with the Kaliningrad Oblast of Russia.

== History ==
The village was founded on November 11, 1558, on the land received by Sebastian Pörlein. It was a village under Chełmno law. According to measurements, in the 17th century the village had 20 włókas.

During the plague epidemic in 1710, 69 people died. The school in Biedaszki was established in 1811. In 1853 there were 32 students. The school was closed at the beginning of the 20th century.

In 1858, 159 people lived in Biedaszki, and at that time the village had 20 włókas. On July 16, 1938, the then German Nazi administration changed the historical name of Polish origin Biedaschken to Wieskoppen. In 1939 there were 154 inhabitants.
