= Skrzypy, Warmian-Masurian Voivodeship =

Skrzypy
- Settlement
- Location within Poland
- Coordinates: 54°5′N 21°33′E
- Country: Poland
- Voivodeship: Warmian-Masurian
- County: Węgorzewo
- Gmina: Węgorzewo

Skrzypy [ˈskʂɨpɨ] (German: Steinhof bei Rosengarten) is a settlement in the administrative district of Gmina Węgorzewo, within Węgorzewo County, Warmian-Masurian Voivodeship. It is located in northern Poland, close to the border with the Kaliningrad Oblast of Russia.
