= Dłużec, Węgorzewo County =

Dłużec
- Village
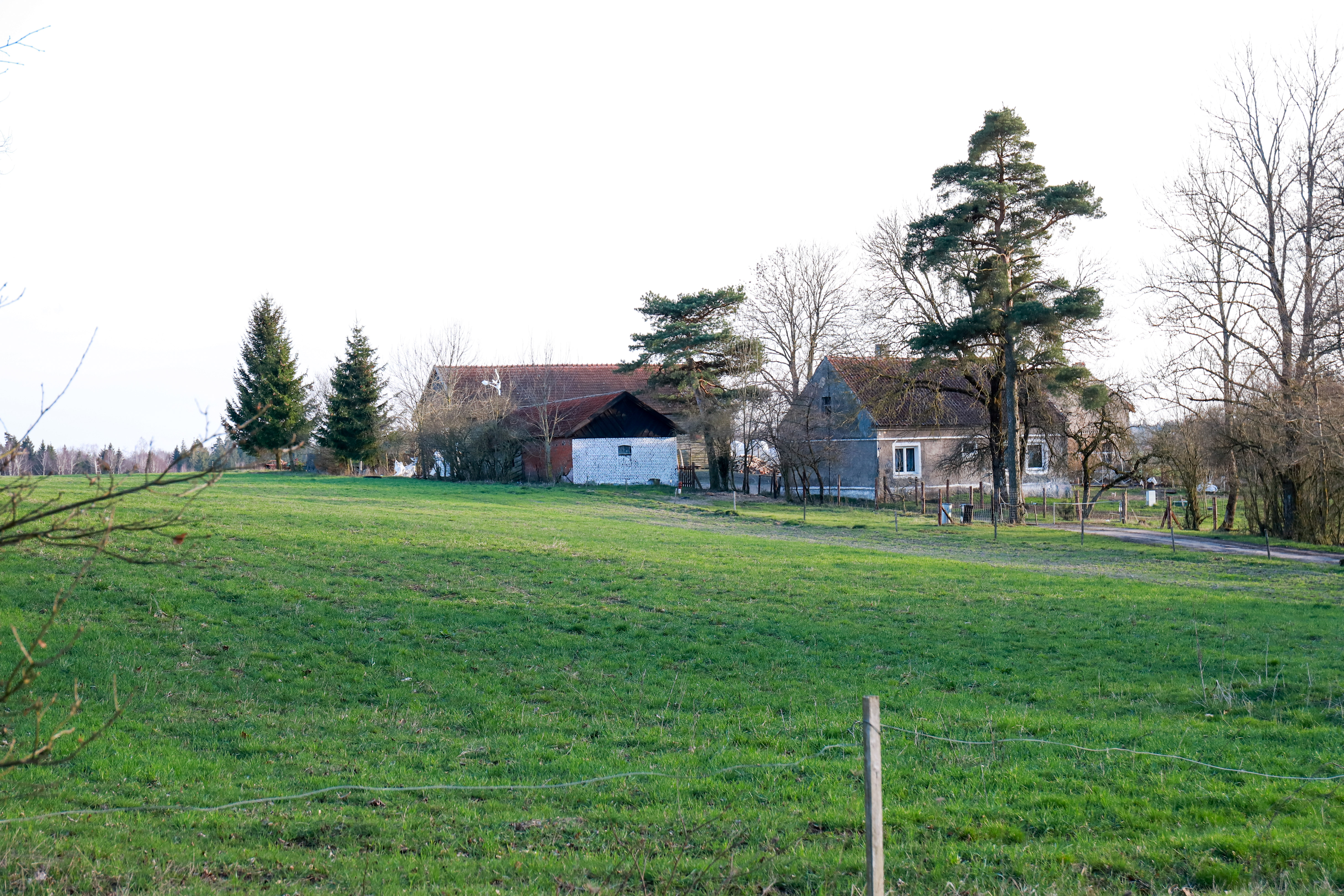

- Location within Poland
- Coordinates: 54°8′N 21°34′E
- Country: Poland
- Voivodeship: Warmian-Masurian
- County: Węgorzewo
- Gmina: Węgorzewo
- Population: 180

Dłużec [ˈdwuʐɛt͡s] (German: Langbrück) is a village in the administrative district of Gmina Węgorzewo, within Węgorzewo County, Warmian-Masurian Voivodeship, in northern Poland, close to the border with the Kaliningrad Oblast of Russia.

The village has a population of 180.
