= Pilwa, Węgorzewo County =

Pilwa
- Village
- Location within Poland
- Coordinates: 54°6′N 21°34′E
- Country: Poland
- Voivodeship: Warmian-Masurian
- County: Węgorzewo
- Gmina: Węgorzewo

Pilwa [ˈpilva] (German: Pilwe) is a village in the administrative district of Gmina Węgorzewo, within Węgorzewo County, Warmian-Masurian Voivodeship, in northern Poland, close to the border with the Kaliningrad Oblast of Russia.
