= Brzozowo, Warmian-Masurian Voivodeship =

Brzozowo
- Village
- Location within Poland
- Coordinates: 54°16′N 21°40′E
- Country: Poland
- Voivodeship: Warmian-Masurian
- County: Węgorzewo
- Gmina: Węgorzewo
- Founded: 1438
- Time zone: UTC+1 (CET)
  - Summer (DST): UTC+2 (CEST)
- Vehicle registration: NWE

Brzozowo [bʐɔˈzɔvɔ] is a village in the administrative district of Gmina Węgorzewo, within Węgorzewo County, Warmian-Masurian Voivodeship, in northern Poland, close to the border with the Kaliningrad Oblast of Russia.

The village was founded in 1438. The Polish noble family of Buschowicz lived in the village.
