= Ogonki, Warmian-Masurian Voivodeship =

Ogonki
- Village
- Location within Poland
- Coordinates: 54°11′N 21°49′E
- Country: Poland
- Voivodeship: Warmian-Masurian
- County: Węgorzewo
- Gmina: Węgorzewo

Ogonki [ɔˈɡɔnki] (German: Schwenten, until 1938 Ogonken) is a village in the administrative district of Gmina Węgorzewo, within Węgorzewo County, Warmian-Masurian Voivodeship, in northern Poland, close to the border with the Kaliningrad Oblast of Russia.
