= Wysiecza =

- Village
- Location within Poland
- Coordinates: 54°14′5″N 21°48′18″E
- Country: Poland
- Voivodeship: Warmian-Masurian
- County: Węgorzewo
- Gmina: Węgorzewo
- Population: 100

Wysiecza [vɨˈɕɛt͡ʂa] (German: Waldheim) is a village in the administrative district of Gmina Węgorzewo, within Węgorzewo County, Warmian-Masurian Voivodeship, in northern Poland, close to the border with the Kaliningrad Oblast of Russia.

The village has a population of 100.
