= Kalskie Nowiny =

- Village
- Location within Poland
- Coordinates: 54°13′00″N 21°46′48″E
- Country: Poland
- Voivodeship: Warmian-Masurian
- County: Węgorzewo
- Gmina: Węgorzewo
- Time zone: UTC+01:00 (CET)
  - Summer (DST): UTC+02:00 (CEST)

Kalskie Nowiny [ˈkalskʲɛ nɔˈvinɨ] (German: Kehlerwald) is a village in the administrative district of Gmina Węgorzewo, within Węgorzewo County, Warmian-Masurian Voivodeship, in northern Poland, close to the border with the Kaliningrad Oblast of Russia. On March 28, 1949, the official Polish name of the village was established as Kalskie Nowiny, with the genitive case defined as Kalskich Nowin and the adjective form as nowiński.
