= Dąbrówka Mała, Węgorzewo County =

Dąbrówka Mała
- Village
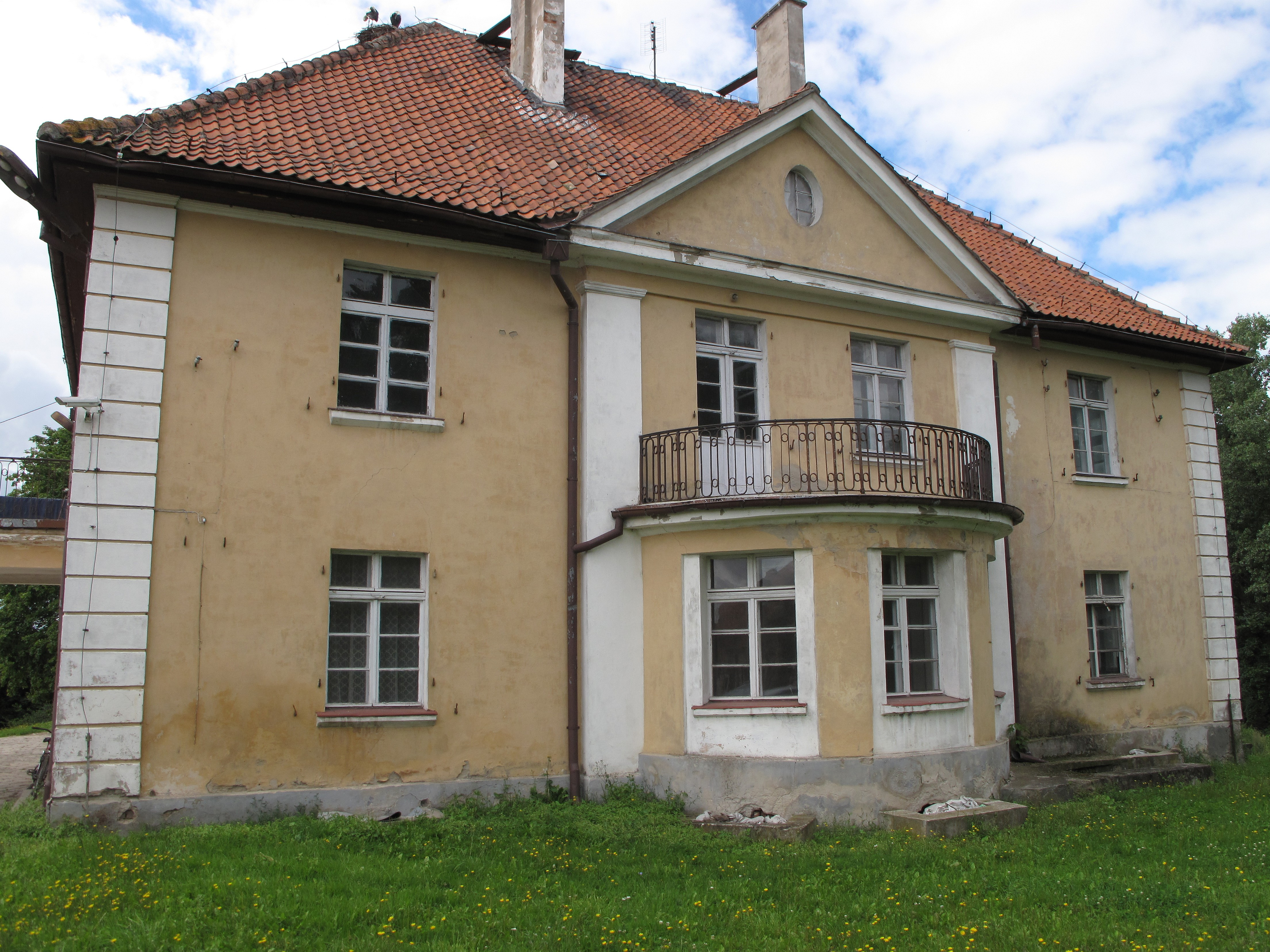
- Old manor house in Dąbrówka Mała

- Location within Poland
- Coordinates: 54°15′38″N 21°37′21″E
- Country: Poland
- Voivodeship: Warmian-Masurian
- County: Węgorzewo
- Gmina: Węgorzewo
- Founded: 1552

Population
  - Total: 180
- Time zone: UTC+1 (CET)
  - Summer (DST): UTC+2 (CEST)
- Vehicle registration: NWE

Dąbrówka Mała [dɔmˈbrufka ˈmawa] (German: Klein Dombrowken, 1482: Damerau) is a village in the administrative district of Gmina Węgorzewo, within Węgorzewo County, Warmian-Masurian Voivodeship, in northern Poland, close to the border with the Kaliningrad Oblast of Russia. It is located in the historic region of Masuria.

The village has a population of 180.

The village was founded in 1552.
