= Przystań, Warmian-Masurian Voivodeship =

Przystań
- Village
- Location within Poland
- Coordinates: 54°12′2″N 21°38′43″E
- Country: Poland
- Voivodeship: Warmian-Masurian
- County: Węgorzewo
- Gmina: Węgorzewo
- Population: 80

Przystań [ˈpʂɨstaɲ] (German: Pristanien, from 1938 to 1945 Passdorf) is a village in the administrative district of Gmina Węgorzewo, within Węgorzewo County, Warmian-Masurian Voivodeship, in northern Poland, close to the border with the Kaliningrad Oblast of Russia.

The village has a population of 80.
