= Karłowo, Warmian-Masurian Voivodeship =

Karłowo
- Village
- Location within Poland
- Coordinates: 54°14′55″N 21°33′17″E
- Country: Poland
- Voivodeship: Warmian-Masurian
- County: Węgorzewo
- Gmina: Węgorzewo

Karłowo [karˈwɔvɔ] (German: Karlswalde) is a village in the administrative district of Gmina Węgorzewo, within Węgorzewo County, Warmian-Masurian Voivodeship, in northern Poland, close to the border with the Kaliningrad Oblast of Russia.
