= Wessel Freytag von Loringhoven =

Member of the German resistance (1899–1944)

Wessel Freiherr Freytag von Loringhoven
- Born: 22 November [O.S. 10] 1899; Groß Born Manor, Groß Born, Kreis Illuxt, Courland Governorate, Russian Empire (in present-day Lielborne, Krāslava Municipality, Latvia)
- Died: 26 July 1944 (aged 44); Mauerwald, Gau East Prussia, Nazi Germany (present-day Mamerki, Warmian-Masurian Voivodeship, Poland)
- Military career
- Allegiance: Baltic nobility Latvia; Weimar Republic; Nazi Germany
- Rank: Oberst
- Conflicts: Latvian War of Independence; World War II

Wessel Oskar Karl Johann Freiherr Freytag von Loringhoven (22 November [O.S. 10] 1899 – 26 July 1944) was a Baltic German colonel in the High Command of the German Armed Forces (OKW) and a member of the German Resistance (Widerstand) against Adolf Hitler. Loringhoven was a friend of Claus von Stauffenberg, who was the leader of the 20 July Plot to assassinate Hitler in 1944.

== Biography ==
Loringhoven came from an aristocratic Baltic German family in Courland, the Frydag, that was descended from Westphalia. He was born in the Groß Born Manor, Courland Governorate (in now Lielborne) but grew up in Adiamünde Manor (in now Skulte) in Livonia. After his Final Exams (Abitur), Loringhoven joined the Baltic-German Army (Baltische Landeswehr) in 1918, and with the formation of independent Latvia he became an officer of the 13th Infantry Regiment of Latvia and participated in liberation of Latgale. After Latvian agrarian reforms in 1920 and subsequent nationalisation of manor lands he decided to leave Latvia in 1922 in order to enter the Army of Weimar Germany (Reichswehr).

Loringhoven initially sympathized with the National Socialist program for Germany. But, in 1934, he was disaffected by the Night of the Long Knives. After more negative experiences with war crimes during the German invasion of the Soviet Union (Operation Barbarossa), Loringhoven joined the resistance against Nazi Germany. In 1943, with the help of Admiral Wilhelm Canaris, Loringhoven was relocated to the High Command of the German Armed Forces (Oberkommando der Wehrmacht, or OKW) as a colonel.

=== 20 July plot ===
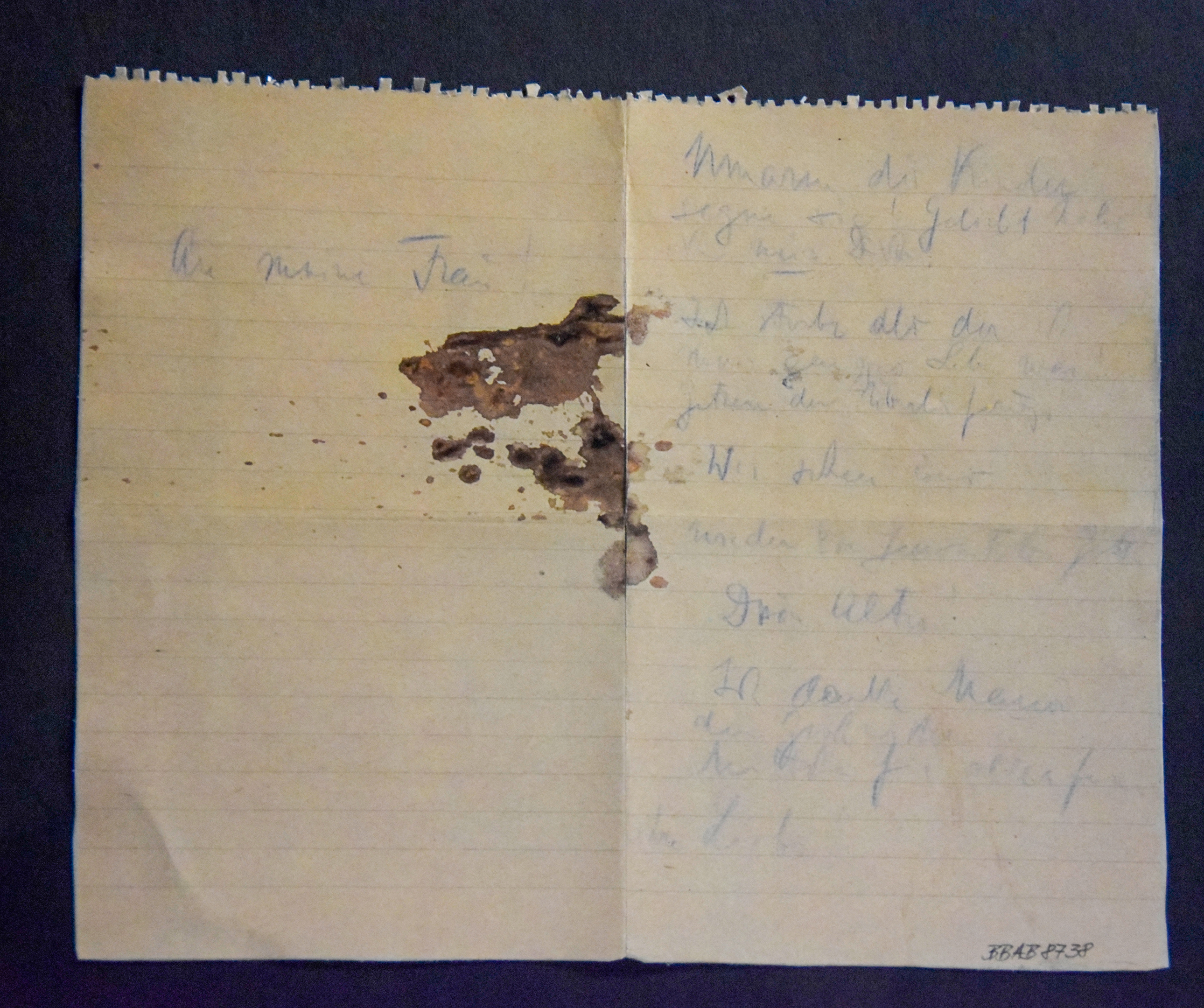
Wessel Freytag von Loringhoven's suicide note with his blood on the paper

Loringhoven provided the detonator charge and explosives for the assassination attempt against Hitler on 20 July 1944. He was able to obtain captured British explosives from German intelligence (Abwehr) sources. British explosives were used in order to make it harder to detect who had supplied them, and also to imply that the British were involved in the plot, thereby diverting attention from the actual conspirators. Nonetheless, Ernst Kaltenbrunner, Chief of the Reich Security Main Office (Reichssicherheitshauptamt; RSHA), discovered the actions of Loringhoven. On 26 July 1944, immediately before he was to be arrested by the Gestapo and fully aware of the interrogation techniques utilized by them, Loringhoven committed suicide at Mauerwald in East Prussia.

=== Aftermath ===
After his death, Loringhoven's wife was imprisoned along with relatives of the other members of the plot. Loringhoven's four sons were separated from their mother. All were eventually liberated by Allied forces.

A close cousin, Bernd Freytag von Loringhoven, was not implicated only due to the intervention of General Heinz Guderian. His cousin was an occupant of the Führerbunker in Berlin towards the end of World War II in Europe. Bernd Freytag von Loringhoven escaped Berlin, was captured by the British, and survived the war.

== Sources ==
- Astaf von Transehe-Roseneck u.a.: Genealogisches Handbuch der Baltischen Ritterschaften. Band Livland, Görlitz 1929, S. 416ff.
- Bernd Freytag von Loringhoven: Freytag von Loringhoven. Eine kurzgefaßte Familiengeschichte, München 1986
- Ulrich Cartarius: Opposition gegen Hitler. Deutscher Widerstand 1933–1945 Berlin 1984, ISBN 3-88680-110-1
- Harald Steffahn: Die Wahrheit über Stalingrad, in: Christian Zentner: Adolf Hitler, Hamburg 1979
- Kaltenbrunner-Berichte an Bormann und Hitler über das Attentat vom 20. Juli 1944, in: Hans-Adolf Jacobsen (Hrsg.): Spiegelbild einer Verschwörung, Stuttgart 1961
- Sven Steenberg: Wlassow – Verräter oder Patriot?< Köln 1968
- Peter Hoffmann: Widerstand, Staatsstreich, Attentat. Der Kampf der Opposition gegen Hitler, München 1969
- Wessel Baron Freytag von Loringhoven. Zum 25. Jahrestag des 20. Juli 1944, in: Nachrichtenblatt der Baltischen Ritterschaften< 11. Jg. (1969), Heft 2 (Juni)
- 20. Juli 1944, hrsg. von der Bundeszentrale für Heimatdienst, Bonn 1960
