= Parowa, Węgorzewo County =

Parowa
- Village
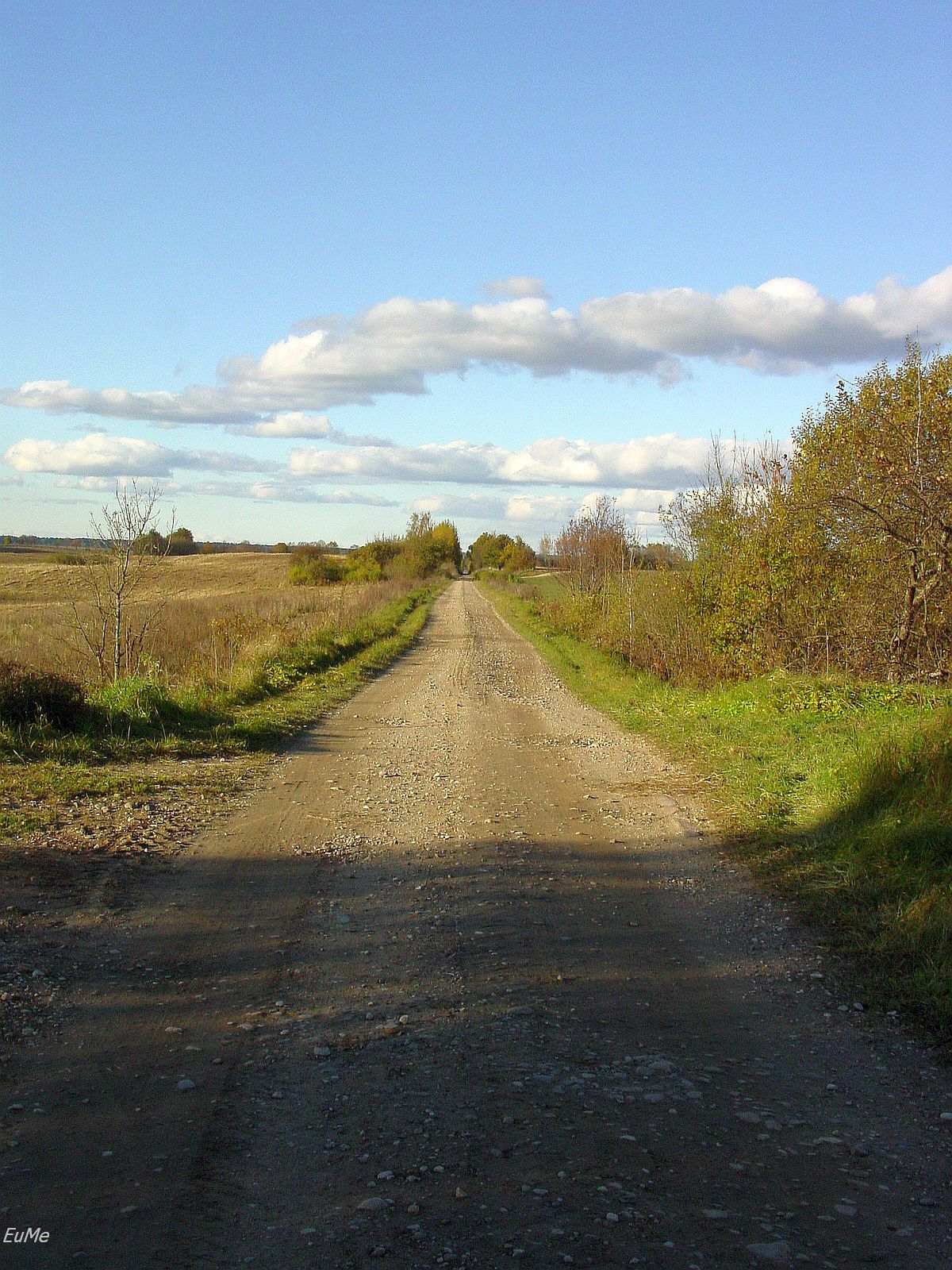
- Unpaved road in Parowa

- Location within Poland
- Coordinates: 54°16′55″N 21°39′46″E
- Country: Poland
- Voivodeship: Warmian-Masurian
- County: Węgorzewo
- Gmina: Węgorzewo

Parowa [paˈrɔva] (German: Birkental) is a village in the administrative district of Gmina Węgorzewo, within Węgorzewo County, Warmian-Masurian Voivodeship, in northern Poland, close to the border with the Kaliningrad Oblast of Russia.
