= Stawiska, Warmian-Masurian Voivodeship =

Stawiska
- Village
- Location within Poland
- Coordinates: 54°8′48″N 21°37′22″E
- Country: Poland
- Voivodeship: Warmian-Masurian
- County: Węgorzewo
- Gmina: Węgorzewo
- Population: 70

Stawiska [staˈviska] (German: Stawisken, from 1938-45 Teichen) is a village in the administrative district of Gmina Węgorzewo, within Węgorzewo County, Warmian-Masurian Voivodeship, in northern Poland, close to the border with the Kaliningrad Oblast of Russia.

The village has a population of 70.
