= Perły =

- Village
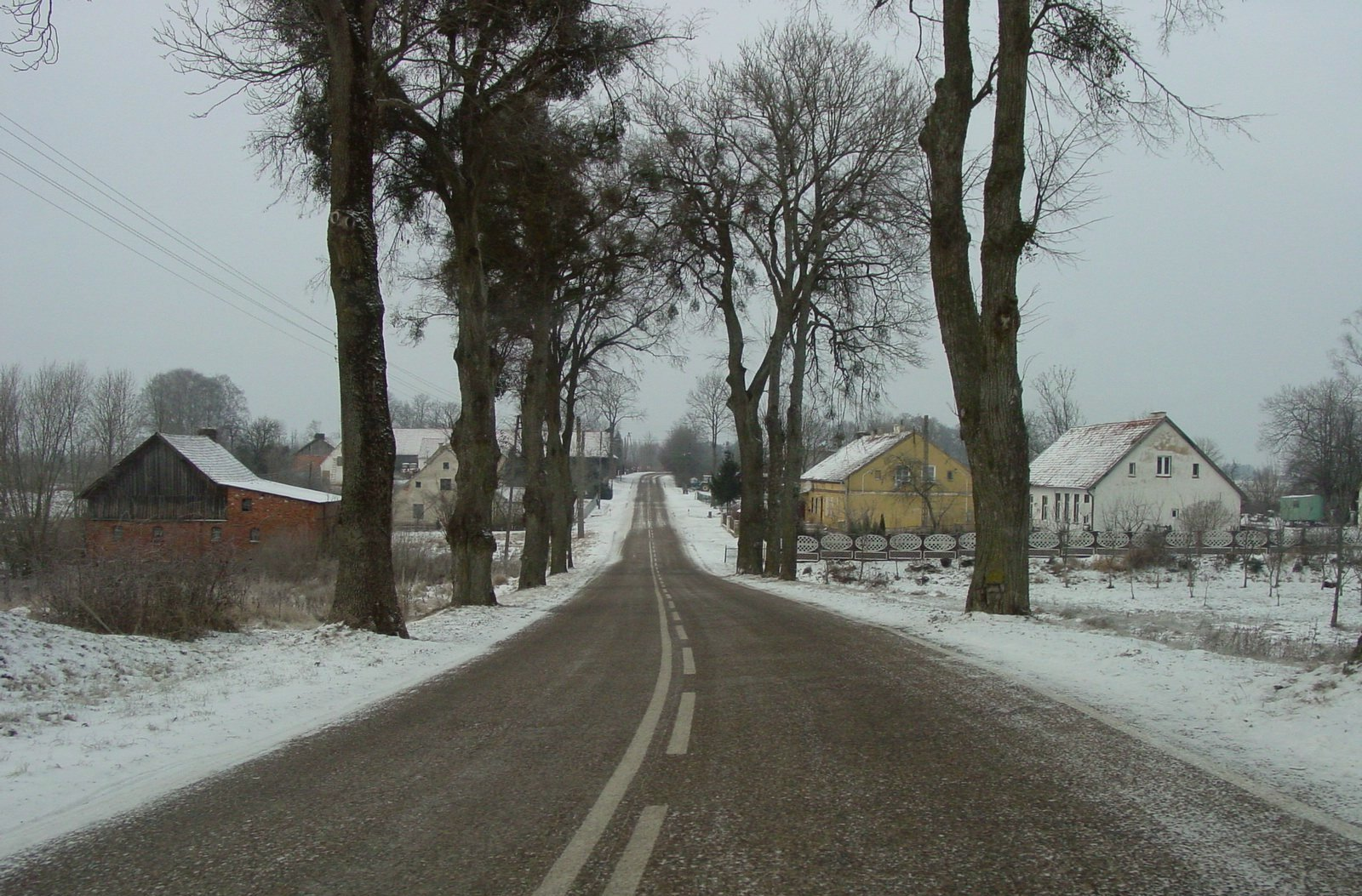

- Location within Poland
- Coordinates: 54°17′53″N 21°39′52″E
- Country: Poland
- Voivodeship: Warmian-Masurian
- County: Węgorzewo
- Gmina: Węgorzewo
- Founded: 1558
- Time zone: UTC+1 (CET)
  - Summer (DST): UTC+2 (CEST)
- Vehicle registration: NWE

Perły ([ˈpɛrwɨ], Polish for 'pearls'; German: Perlswalde) is a village in the administrative district of Gmina Węgorzewo, within Węgorzewo County, Warmian-Masurian Voivodeship, in north-eastern Poland. It is located in the region of Masuria, close to the border with the Kaliningrad Oblast of Russia.

== History ==
The village was founded in 1558. In the late 19th century, the village had a population of 410, Polish by ethnicity, living off farming and horse and cattle breeding.
