= Jerzykowo =

Jerzykowo may refer to the following places:

- Jerzykowo, Gniezno County in Greater Poland Voivodeship (west-central Poland)
- Jerzykowo, Poznań County in Greater Poland Voivodeship (west-central Poland)
- Jerzykowo, Warmian-Masurian Voivodeship (north Poland)
