= Ruska Wieś, Węgorzewo County =

Ruska Wieś
- Village
- Location within Poland
- Coordinates: 54°12′N 21°42′E
- Country: Poland
- Voivodeship: Warmian-Masurian
- County: Węgorzewo
- Gmina: Węgorzewo
- Founded: 1421

Population
  - Total: 34
- Time zone: UTC+1 (CET)
  - Summer (DST): UTC+2 (CEST)
- Vehicle registration: NWE

Ruska Wieś [ˈruska ˈvjɛɕ] (German: Reussen) is a village in the administrative district of Gmina Węgorzewo, within Węgorzewo County, Warmian-Masurian Voivodeship, in north-eastern Poland, close to the border with the Kaliningrad Oblast of Russia. It is located in Masuria.

Ruska Wieś was founded in 1421. Members of the Polish noble families of Bronikowski, Krasiński and Ossoliński lived in the village.
