= Zacisze, Warmian-Masurian Voivodeship =

Zacisze
- Village
- Location within Poland
- Coordinates: 54°8′49″N 21°34′28″E
- Country: Poland
- Voivodeship: Warmian-Masurian
- County: Węgorzewo
- Gmina: Węgorzewo

Zacisze [zaˈt͡ɕiʂɛ] is a village in the administrative district of Gmina Węgorzewo, within Węgorzewo County, Warmian-Masurian Voivodeship, in northern Poland, close to the border with the Kaliningrad Oblast of Russia.
