= Róże =

- Village
- Location within Poland
- Coordinates: 54°08′16″N 21°33′51″E
- Country: Poland
- Voivodeship: Warmian-Masurian
- County: Węgorzewo
- Gmina: Węgorzewo

Róże [ˈruʐɛ] (German: Rosenhof) is a village in the administrative district of Gmina Węgorzewo, within Węgorzewo County, Warmian-Masurian Voivodeship, in northern Poland, close to the border with the Kaliningrad Oblast of Russia.
