= Pasternak, Warmian-Masurian Voivodeship =

Pasternak
- Village
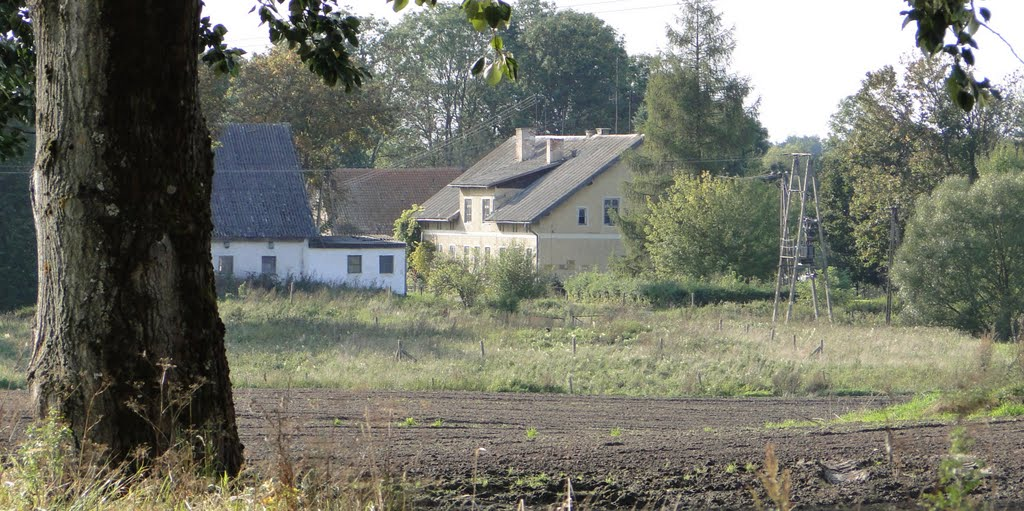

- Location within Poland
- Coordinates: 54°18′49″N 21°37′57″E
- Country: Poland
- Voivodeship: Warmian-Masurian
- County: Węgorzewo
- Gmina: Węgorzewo

Pasternak [pasˈtɛrnak] (German: Waldhof) is a village in the administrative district of Gmina Węgorzewo, within Węgorzewo County, Warmian-Masurian Voivodeship, in northern Poland, close to the border with the Kaliningrad Oblast of Russia.
