= Zielony Ostrów =

- Settlement
- Location within Poland
- Coordinates: 54°19′03″N 21°34′10″E
- Country: Poland
- Voivodeship: Warmian-Masurian
- County: Węgorzewo
- Gmina: Węgorzewo

Zielony Ostrów (Polish pronunciation: [ʑɛˈlɔnɨ ˈɔstruf]; German: Bergenthal) is a settlement in the administrative district of Gmina Węgorzewo, within Węgorzewo County, Warmian-Masurian Voivodeship, in northern Poland, close to the border with the Kaliningrad Oblast of Russia.
