= Janówko, Warmian-Masurian Voivodeship =

Janówko
- Village
- Location within Poland
- Coordinates: 54°13′36″N 21°41′54″E
- Country: Poland
- Voivodeship: Warmian-Masurian
- County: Węgorzewo
- Gmina: Węgorzewo

Janówko [jaˈnufkɔ] (German: Johanneshof) is a village in the administrative district of Gmina Węgorzewo, within Węgorzewo County, Warmian-Masurian Voivodeship, in northern Poland, close to the border with the Kaliningrad Oblast of Russia.
