= Czerwony Dwór, Węgorzewo County =

Czerwony Dwór
- Village
- Location within Poland
- Coordinates: 54°13′47″N 21°45′48″E
- Country: Poland
- Voivodeship: Warmian-Masurian
- County: Węgorzewo
- Gmina: Węgorzewo
- Population: 170

Czerwony Dwór [t͡ʂɛrˈvɔnɨ ˈdvur] (German: Rothof, Lithuanian: Raudondvaris) is a village in the administrative district of Gmina Węgorzewo, within Węgorzewo County, Warmian-Masurian Voivodeship, in northern Poland, close to the border with the Kaliningrad Oblast of Russia.

The village has a population of 170.
