= Różewiec =

- Village
- Location within Poland
- Coordinates: 54°14′47″N 21°36′07″E
- Country: Poland
- Voivodeship: Warmian-Masurian
- County: Węgorzewo
- Gmina: Węgorzewo

Różewiec [ruˈʐɛvjɛt͡s] (German: Rosenstein) is a village in the administrative district of Gmina Węgorzewo, within Węgorzewo County, Warmian-Masurian Voivodeship, in northern Poland, close to the border with the Kaliningrad Oblast of Russia.
