= Nowa Guja =

- Settlement
- Location within Poland
- Coordinates: 54°16′41″N 21°35′03″E
- Country: Poland
- Voivodeship: Warmian-Masurian
- County: Węgorzewo
- Gmina: Węgorzewo
- Time zone: UTC+01:00 (CET)
  - Summer (DST): UTC+02:00 (CEST)

Nowa Guja [ˈnɔva ˈɡuja] (German: Neu Guja) is a settlement in the administrative district of Gmina Węgorzewo, within Węgorzewo County, Warmian-Masurian Voivodeship, in northern Poland, close to the border with the Kaliningrad Oblast of Russia.
