= Sztynort Mały =

- Village
- Location within Poland
- Coordinates: 54°9′0″N 21°38′7″E
- Country: Poland
- Voivodeship: Warmian-Masurian
- County: Węgorzewo
- Gmina: Węgorzewo
- Population: 60

Sztynort Mały [ˈʂtɨnɔrt ˈmawɨ] (German: Klein Steinort) is a village in the administrative district of Gmina Węgorzewo, within Węgorzewo County, Warmian-Masurian Voivodeship, in northern Poland, close to the border with the Kaliningrad Oblast of Russia.

The village has a population of 60.
