= Wesołowo, Węgorzewo County =

Wesołowo
- Village
- Location within Poland
- Coordinates: 54°18′N 21°37′E
- Country: Poland
- Voivodeship: Warmian-Masurian
- County: Węgorzewo
- Gmina: Węgorzewo

Wesołowo [vɛsɔˈwɔvɔ] (German: Groß Wessolowen) is a village in the administrative district of Gmina Węgorzewo, within Węgorzewo County, Warmian-Masurian Voivodeship, in northern Poland, close to the border with the Kaliningrad Oblast of Russia.
