= Jakunowo =

- Village
- Location within Poland
- Coordinates: 54°16′N 21°46′E
- Country: Poland
- Voivodeship: Warmian-Masurian
- County: Węgorzewo
- Gmina: Węgorzewo
- Time zone: UTC+1 (CET)
  - Summer (DST): UTC+2 (CEST)
- Vehicle registration: NWE

Jakunowo [jakuˈnɔvɔ] is a village in the administrative district of Gmina Węgorzewo, within Węgorzewo County, Warmian-Masurian Voivodeship, in northern Poland, close to the border with the Kaliningrad Oblast of Russia.

Jakunowo was founded by 1565. The Łoś Polish noble family lived in the village.
