= Radzieje =

- Village
- Location within Poland
- Coordinates: 54°8′N 21°35′E
- Country: Poland
- Voivodeship: Warmian-Masurian
- County: Węgorzewo
- Gmina: Węgorzewo
- Population: 510

Radzieje [raˈd͡ʑɛjɛ] (German: Rosengarten) is a village in the administrative district of Gmina Węgorzewo, within Węgorzewo County, Warmian-Masurian Voivodeship, in northern Poland, close to the border with the Kaliningrad Oblast of Russia.

The village has a population of 510.

== Notable residents ==
- Kurt Haehling (1893–1983), German general
