= Łęgwarowo =

- Village
- Location within Poland
- Coordinates: 54°19′02″N 21°42′25″E
- Country: Poland
- Voivodeship: Warmian-Masurian
- County: Węgorzewo
- Gmina: Węgorzewo

Łęgwarowo [wɛnɡvaˈrɔvɔ] (German: Lingwarowen, from 1938-45 Berglingen) is a village in the administrative district of Gmina Węgorzewo, within Węgorzewo County, Warmian-Masurian Voivodeship, in northern Poland, close to the border with the Kaliningrad Oblast of Russia.
