= Stulichy =

- Village
- Location within Poland
- Coordinates: 54°15′N 21°45′E
- Country: Poland
- Voivodeship: Warmian-Masurian
- County: Węgorzewo
- Gmina: Węgorzewo
- Founded: 1562
- Time zone: UTC+1 (CET)
  - Summer (DST): UTC+2 (CEST)
- Vehicle registration: NWE

Stulichy [stuˈlixɨ] is a village in the administrative district of Gmina Węgorzewo, within Węgorzewo County, Warmian-Masurian Voivodeship, in northern Poland, close to the border with the Kaliningrad Oblast of Russia.

Stulichy was established in 1562 by Stańko, who bought land to establish the village.
