= Kamień, Węgorzewo County =

Kamień
- Village
- Location within Poland
- Coordinates: 54°11′54″N 21°35′50″E
- Country: Poland
- Voivodeship: Warmian-Masurian
- County: Węgorzewo
- Gmina: Węgorzewo

Kamień (pronounced [ˈkamjɛj̃]; German: Stein) is a village in the administrative district of Gmina Węgorzewo, within Węgorzewo County, Warmian-Masurian Voivodeship, in northern Poland, close to the border with the Kaliningrad Oblast of Russia.
