= Stawki, Warmian-Masurian Voivodeship =

Stawki
- Village
- Location within Poland
- Coordinates: 54°12′N 21°37′E
- Country: Poland
- Voivodeship: Warmian-Masurian
- County: Węgorzewo
- Gmina: Węgorzewo

Stawki [ˈstafki] (German: Stawken, 1938–1945 Staken) is a village in the administrative district of Gmina Węgorzewo, within Węgorzewo County, Warmian-Masurian Voivodeship, in northern Poland, close to the border with the Kaliningrad Oblast of Russia.
