= Y the Magician =

Polish magician, mentalist, and digital creator (born 1991)

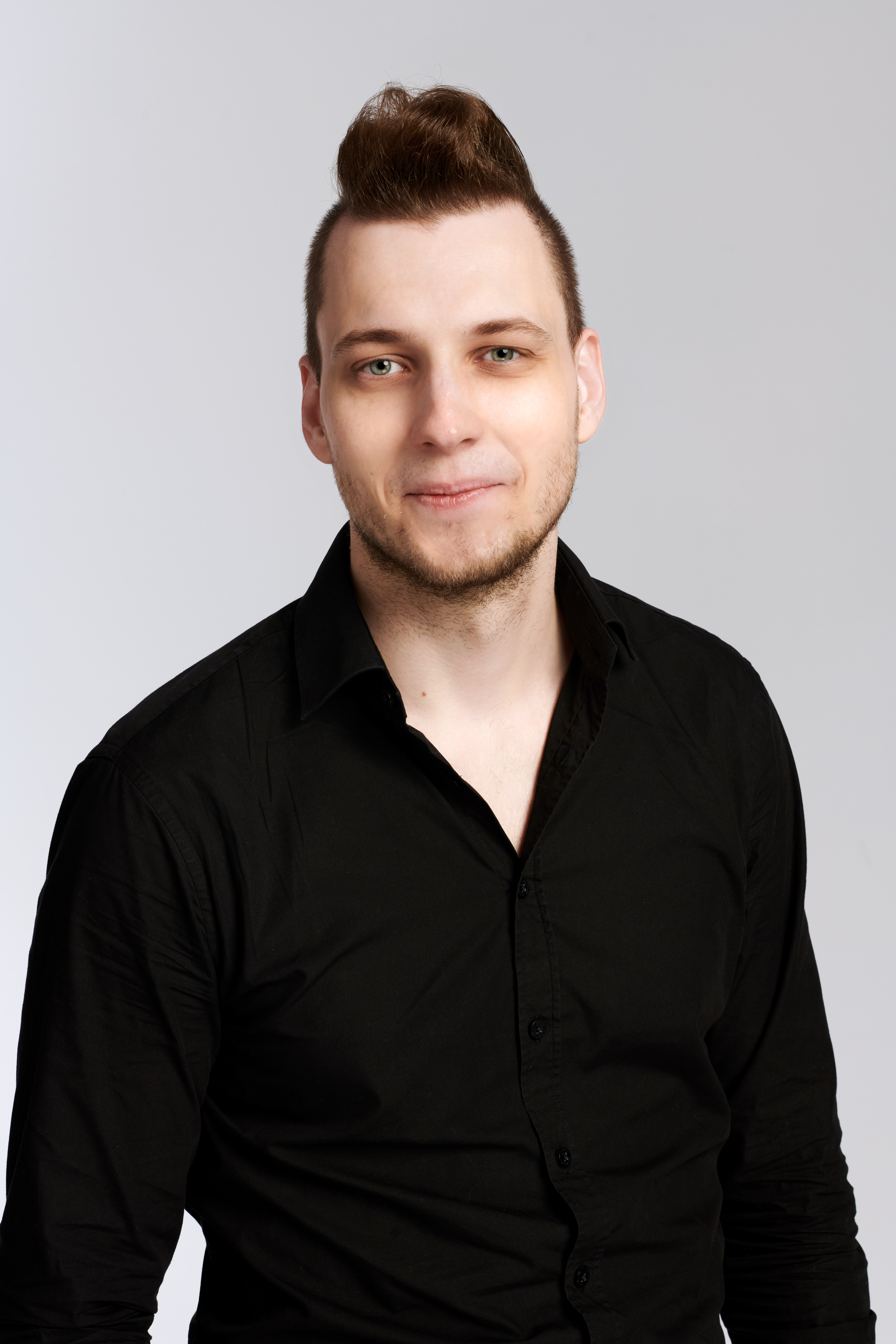
- Born: 3 November 1991 (age 34); Węgorzewo, Poland
- Occupations: Illusionist, mentalist
- Website: www.iluzjonista.pl

Y Dzięgielewski (born 3 November 1991), commonly known as Y the Magician, is a Polish illusionist, mentalist and online creator. He first gained public attention through televised talent shows and later built an online presence through digital media.

== Early life ==
Dzięgielewski was born in Węgorzewo, Poland. He developed an interest in magic during childhood and started studying techniques from books and online resources. He briefly studied applied mathematics before focusing on his performance.

== Career ==
He first appeared on national television on the talent show Mam Talent! where he reached the semifinals. Subsequently, he started a YouTube channel dedicated to magic and illusion techniques. According to Puls Biznesu newspaper, his online magic videos have made him one of the most followed magicians on social platforms. He is known for his large online audience and digital magic performances, with a combined online audience approaching three million followers.

Dzięgielewski has performed for internationally recognizable figures including Mike Tyson, Jared Leto, DJ Tiësto, MrBeast, Jesse Eisenberg, Dave Franco, and other cast members of the Lionsgate film Now You See Me: Now You Don’t (2025). He also collaborated with Lionsgate to create personalized illusions for the film’s global press junket.

His television appearances include a feature on the U.S. series Magic Caught on Camera on the Travel Channel.

=== Collaborations with global brands ===
Dzięgielewski has developed custom illusions and promotional content for multinational companies, including TikTok, Coca-Cola, the Ultimate Fighting Championship (UFC), and Procter & Gamble, with the performance for P&G broadcast simultaneously to audiences in more than 25 countries.

== Performance style ==
Dzięgielewski is known for a “one-man-show” approach that emphasizes interaction with spectators. His style combines elements of traditional illusion with psychological techniques emphasizing audience interaction. He has described magic as a way to address personal challenges and build confidence.

== Personal life ==
Dzięgielewski has stated that he originally turned to magic as a way to overcome shyness, later developing it into a full-time artistic career and establishing his digital-magic brand.
