= Węgielsztyn =

- Village
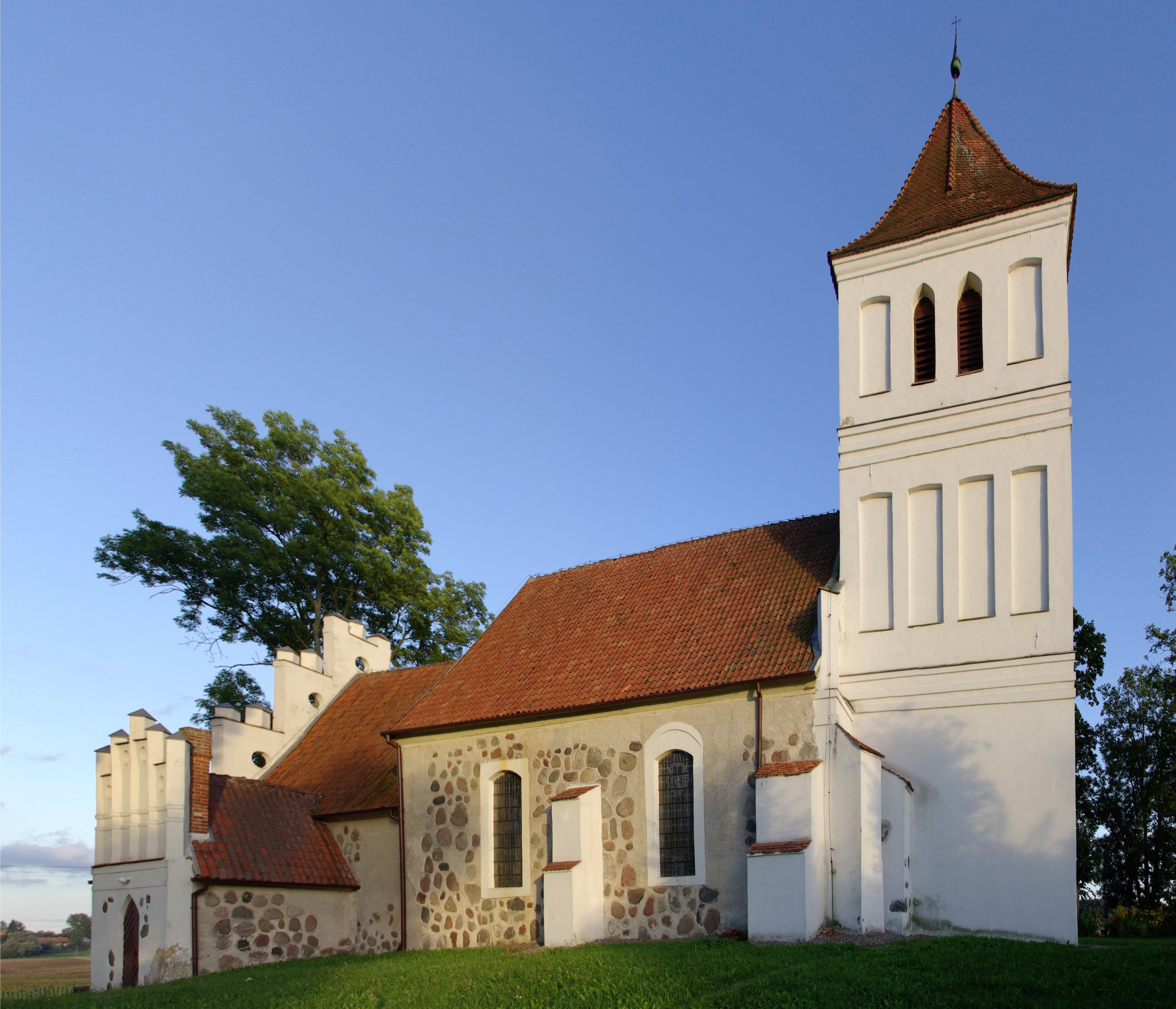
- Church of Saint Joseph

- Location within Poland
- Coordinates: 54°14′N 21°38′E
- Country: Poland
- Voivodeship: Warmian-Masurian
- County: Węgorzewo
- Gmina: Węgorzewo

Węgielsztyn [vɛnˈɡʲɛlʂtɨn] (German: Engelstein) is a village in the administrative district of Gmina Węgorzewo, within Węgorzewo County, Warmian-Masurian Voivodeship, in northern Poland, close to the border with the Kaliningrad Oblast of Russia.
