= Jerzykowo, Warmian-Masurian Voivodeship =

Jerzykowo
- Village
- Location within Poland
- Coordinates: 54°12′2″N 21°50′1″E
- Country: Poland
- Voivodeship: Warmian-Masurian
- County: Węgorzewo
- Gmina: Węgorzewo
- Population: 50

Jerzykowo [jɛʐɨˈkɔvɔ] (German: Georgenau) is a village in the administrative district of Gmina Węgorzewo, within Węgorzewo County, Warmian-Masurian Voivodeship, in northern Poland, close to the border with the Kaliningrad Oblast of Russia.

The village has a population of 50.
