= Guja =

- Village
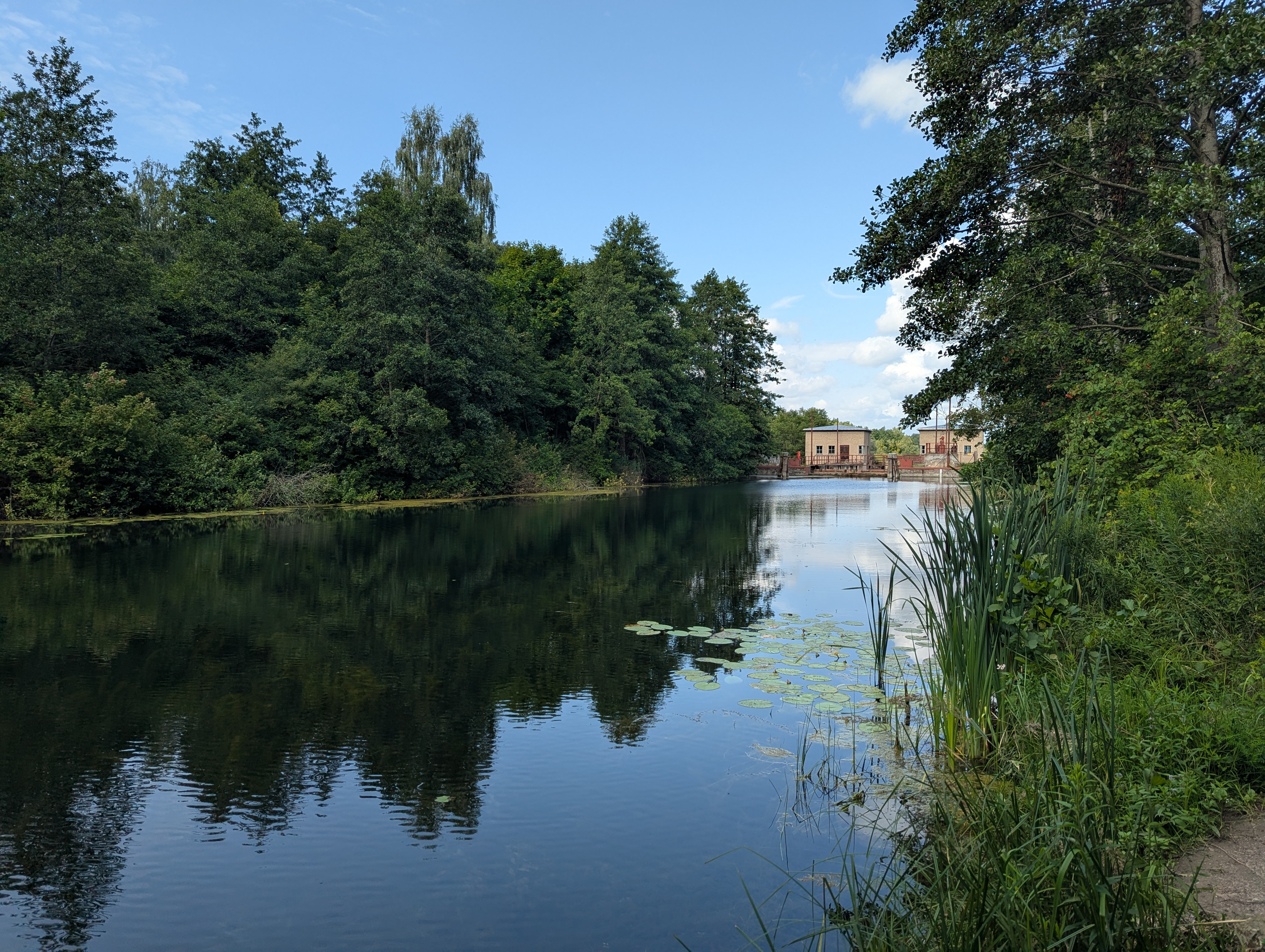
- Piaski Lock of the Masurian Canal in Guja

- Location within Poland
- Coordinates: 54°16′N 21°36′E
- Country: Poland
- Voivodeship: Warmian-Masurian
- County: Węgorzewo
- Gmina: Węgorzewo
- Population: 240
- Vehicle registration: NWE

Guja [ˈɡuja] (Note: German: Groß Guja) is a village in the administrative district of Gmina Węgorzewo, within Węgorzewo County, Warmian-Masurian Voivodeship, in north-eastern Poland, close to the border with the Kaliningrad Oblast of Russia.

The village has a population of 240.
