= Clan Mackie =

Lowland Scottish clan

Crest badge derived from the arms of Mackie of Larg. The crest within is blazoned A raven Proper and the motto is LABORA (Latin for "Toil").

Coat of arms of the Mackie of Larg, the last known chief of Mackie

Clan Mackie is a Lowland Scottish clan. The clan does not have a chief recognised by the Lord Lyon King of Arms therefore the clan has no standing under Scots Law. Clan Mackie is considered an armigerous clan, meaning that it is considered to have had at one time a recognised chief, or a chief who possessed the chiefly arms of the name; however, no one at present is in possession of such arms.

== Origins ==
The clan-name Mackie is an Anglicised form of the Gaelic MacAoidh.'". The Gaelic personal name Aoidh is an old one and means "fire".

== History ==
Clan Mackie was a prominent Galwegien family in the 16th and early 17th centuries. The Mackies of Larg were the principal family of the clan. At the beginning of the 17th century, Sir Patrick Mackie of Larg was one of the original fifty Scottish undertakers of the plantation of Ulster. About 1,000 acres (4.05 km^{2}; 1.56 sq mi) of his lands, near Donegal, were however later taken over by John, earl of Annandale. The Mackies of Larg acquired the lands of Bargaly in Kirkcudbrightshire and Auchencairn near Castle Douglas. Today there are still Mackies in Kirkcudbright.

One prominent cadet house was the Mackie of Corraith.

== Symbols ==
The arms of Mackie of Larg is blazoned Argent, two ravens pendant from an arrow fessways piercing their necks Proper, on a chief Azure a lion passant of the Field armed and langued Gules. The origin of these arms is explained by tradition. Mackie of Larg was to have been in the company of Robert II and was boasting of his prowess in the skill of archery. The king of Scots, growing weary of this, pointed out two ravens on a distant tree and asked Mackie of Larg to prove his boasts. However, much to the chagrin of the King, Mackie of Large skewered both ravens with his arrow. Tradition goes on to state that because of his feat Mackie of Larg was granted the right to bear on his shield two ravens pierced by an arrow through their neck, together with a lion which alluded to the king.

The 1906 book The Book of Mackay by Angus Mackay gives the following information: According to Barbour's Metrical History of Bruce, the hunted Robert escaped from the beagles of John MacDougall in 1306 and made his way alone on foot. He arrived at an appointed trysting place near Loch Dee in Galloway where he could safely wait. He came upon a widow, Anabel, and her three sons who were very good archers, M'Kie, M'Clurg and Muiredach; they hospitably entertained the Bruce. During the night the king was joined by his brother Edward and Sir James Douglas with about 150 men. The next morning the widow's sons gave an exhibition of their prowess with the bow which greatly delighted the Bruce. With one arrow M'Kie transfixed a brace of ravens perched upon a rock, while his brother Muiredach brought down the third corbie on the wing. Bruce asked the sons to join him as he could use their skills.

This incident is supposed to account for the brace of pierced ravens which find a place on the shield of M'Kie (Mackie). The arms of M'Kie of Larg were never recorded in the Lyon Register, but they are described in the Heraldic Manuscripts of Sir James Balfour as follows: Argent, two ravens pendent from an arrow fessways piercing their necks proper, on a shield azure a lion passant representation, and the crest and motto, which are respectively a raven proper and Labora.

In addition later the Bruce rewarded the loyal widow and her gallant sons, who had fought for him so well, bestowing upon the family, "...the hassock of land 'tween Palnure and Penkill," to wit, the thirty pound land of Cumloden in the parish of Minnigaff and stewartry of Kirkcudbright.

== Possible connection to the Clan Mackay ==
According to historian Angus Mackay, the Mackies of Galloway may have been descended from Martin who was the third son of Iye MacHeth, 1st chief of the Clan Mackay who lived in the thirteenth century. Angus Mackay states that in the 17th century, Sir Patrick Mackie of Lairg in Galloway commanded a company of the regiment that was commanded by Donald Mackay, 1st Lord Reay. He also states that the idea that the Clan Mackay family of Strathnaver were related to the Mackie family of Galloway through Martin of Stathnaver was evidently accepted by Sir Robert Gordon, 1st Baronet and that Gordon was closely acquainted with both Sir Donald Mackay of Stathnaver and Sir Patrick Mackie of Lairg, Galloway, and would have therefore gathered information from both. The Mackay of Stathnaver Blackcastle Manuscript also states that Martin of Stathnaver settled in Galloway in agreement with Sir Robert Gordon. Angus Mackay also notes the similarities in the coats of arms of the Mackay of Aberach branch of the Strathnaver Mackays and the Galloway Mackies. Sir Donald Mackay, 1st Lord Reay and Sir Patrick Mackie of Lairg, Galloway, both signed themselves as Mackie. Angus Mackay concludes that the Mackie form of the name was common in both Strathnaver (Clan Mackay territory) and in Galloway, but that the majority of those named Mackie would have been from Galloway.

== See also ==
- Mackie (disambiguation)
- Clan Mackay, a separate Scottish clan which also derives its name from the Gaelic Aodh
