= Maćki =

- Village
- Location within Poland
- Coordinates: 54°14′03″N 21°43′34″E
- Country: Poland
- Voivodeship: Warmian-Masurian
- County: Węgorzewo
- Gmina: Węgorzewo

Maćki [ˈmat͡ɕki] (German: Schönbrunn) is a village in the administrative district of Gmina Węgorzewo, within Węgorzewo County, Warmian-Masurian Voivodeship, in northern Poland, close to the border with the Kaliningrad Oblast of Russia.
