= Mackie =

Mackie may refer to:

== Organizations ==
- Mackie (company), American manufacturer of professional audio equipment
- Mackie International, a textile machinery engineering plant and foundry in Northern Ireland
- Mackie Academy, a secondary school in Stonehaven, Aberdeenshire, Scotland
- Mackie's, Scottish ice cream and confectionery manufacturer

== People ==
- Mackie (surname), a Scottish surname, including a list of people with the name
- Clan Mackie, a Scottish clan
- Mackie Osborne, designer and illustrator of many music albums since the 1980s
- Malcolm Mackie Hobson (born 1966), South African former cricketer
- Matthew Mackie Samoskevich (born 2002), American ice hockey player
- Michael Mackie Crane (born 1982), Bermudian cricketer
- Mackie Mackintosh, Scottish musician, member of the band 'Aerial'
- Mackenzie McDonald (born 1995), American tennis player
- Mackie Ratwatte, Sri Lankan physician

== Places ==
- Mackie River, Western Australia
- Mackie Lake (Manitoba), Canada
- Mackie Lake (Ontario), Canada, north of Plevna, Ontario
- Mackie Lake, (Wisconsin), United States - see List of lakes in Wisconsin
- Mackie Building, Milwaukee, Wisconsin, United States, on the National Register of Historic Places

== See also ==
- Mackie lines, a border effect in photography
