= Węgorzewo =

Town in Warmian-Masurian Voivodeship, Poland

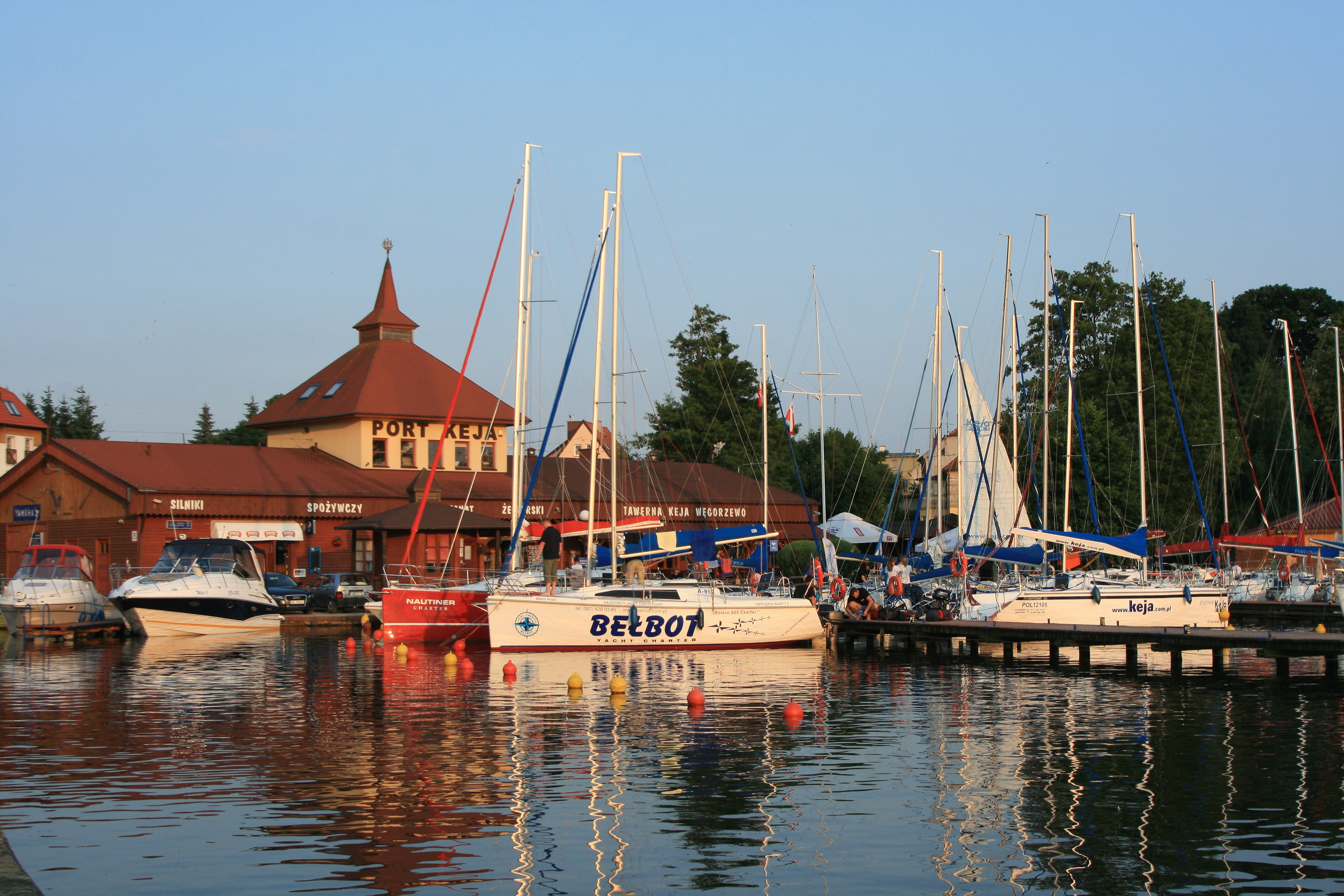
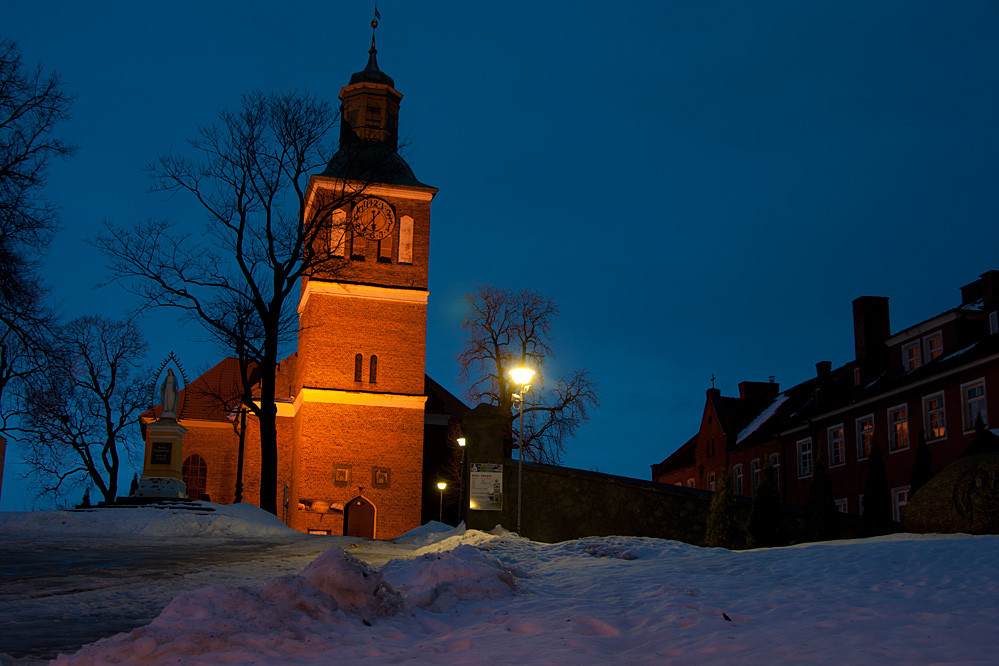
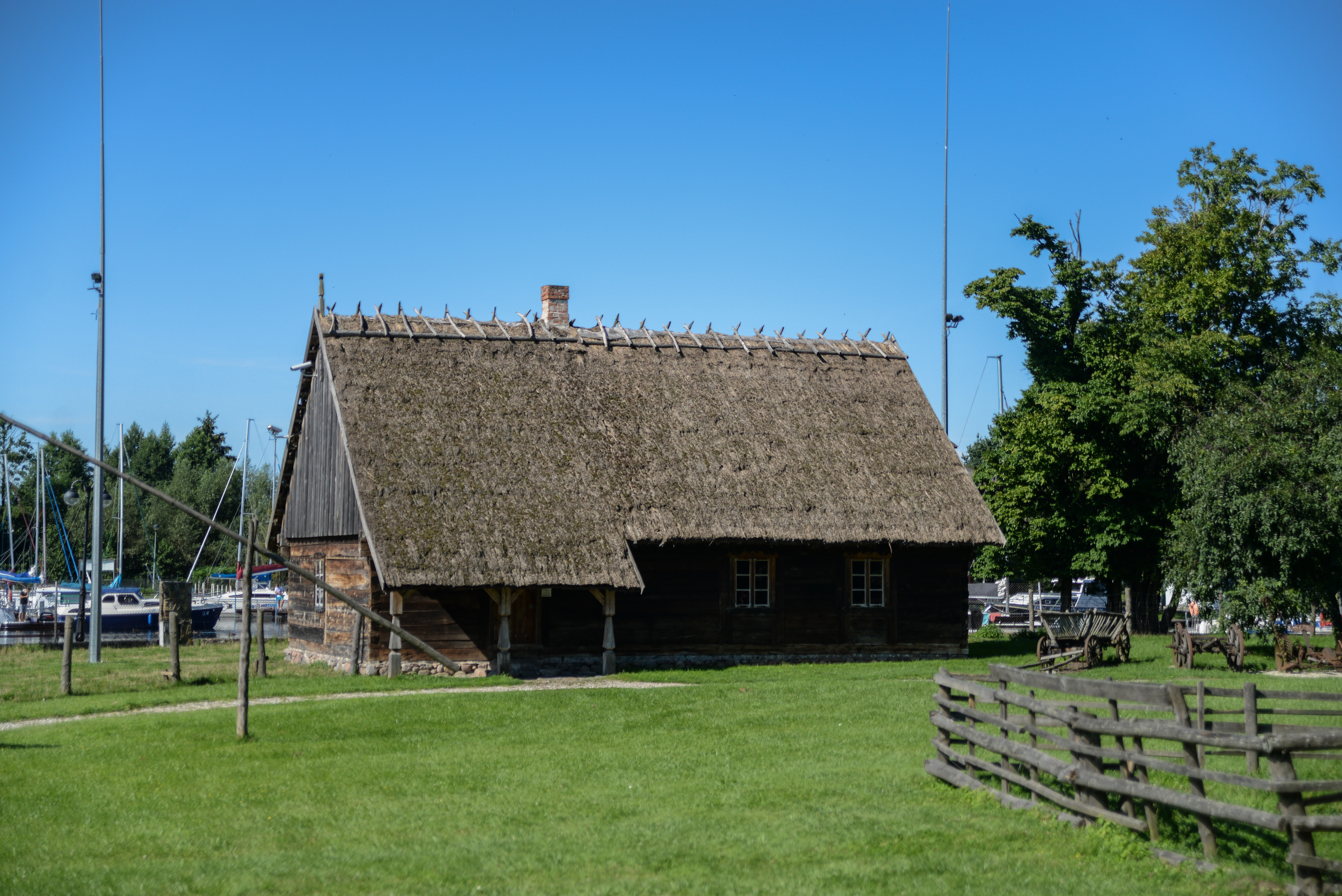
- Marina in Węgorzewo Saints Peter and Paul church Ethnographic Park

- Coat of arms

- Location within Poland
- Coordinates: 54°13′N 21°45′E
- Country: Poland
- Voivodeship: Warmian-Masurian
- County: Węgorzewo
- Gmina: Węgorzewo
- Established: 14th century
- Town rights: 1571

Government
  - Mayor: Krzysztof Kołaszewski

Area
  - Total: 10.87 km^{2} (4.20 sq mi)

Population (2025)
  - Total: 10,490
  - Density: 965.0/km^{2} (2,499/sq mi)
- Time zone: UTC+1 (CET)
  - Summer (DST): UTC+2 (CEST)
- Postal code: 11-600, 11-601
- Area code: +48 87
- Car plates: NWE
- Website: http://www.wegorzewo.pl

Węgorzewo (Polish pronunciation: [vɛŋɡɔˈʐɛvɔ]; until 1946 Polish: Węgobork; German: Angerburg) is a tourist town on the Angrapa River in northeastern Poland, within the ethnographic region of Masuria. It is the seat of Węgorzewo County in the Warmian-Masurian Voivodeship and is located not far from the border with Russia's Kaliningrad Oblast. Lake Mamry is close to the town.

== Etymology ==
The town's names in different languages are derived from local names for European eels, which used to live in the area in great numbers. The German name Angerburg is derived from the Old Prussian word for eel, Anger, which the German Teutonic Knights appropriated after conquering the Old Prussians. The Polish name Węgorzewo (and the older Węgobork) is derived from Węgorz, while the local Lithuanian names Ungura and Unguris comes from Ungurys. A Lithuanian variation is Angerburgas.

== History ==
=== Beginnings ===
The town was first mentioned in a 1335 chronicle as Angirburg, or "eel castle", a settlement of the Teutonic Knights with a block house, a palisade, and a watchtower. A 1341 document reported that the Teutonic Order had bestowed land on the river Angerapp (Angrapa) upon twelve Old Prussians for their loyal service. The Grand Duke of Lithuania, Kęstutis, destroyed the castle in 1365, although it was rebuilt in 1398. The completion of the stone castle Angerburg allowed the Teutonic Knights to increase development of the surrounding countryside.

=== Polish suzerainty ===
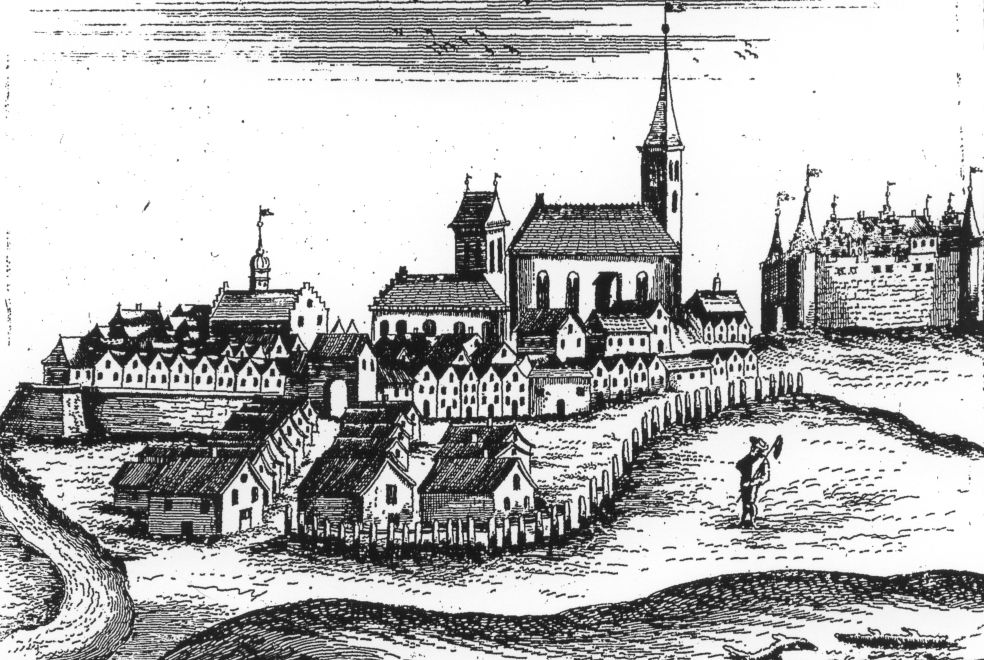
Węgobork/Angerburg in 1684

In 1454, the region was incorporated by King Casimir IV Jagiellon into the Kingdom of Poland upon the request of the anti-Teutonic Prussian Confederation. After the subsequent Thirteen Years' War (1454–1466), the Teutonic Order regained authority over the town as a fief of the Polish Crown. The land around the castle began to be settled by the end of the 15th century. As it was primarily farmland, the Lake Mamry was blocked up to allow the construction of a watermill. Ca. 1510 a locality known as Neudorf ("new village") or Gerothwol had developed near the Angerburg. After the foundation of the Duchy of Prussia as a fief of the Kingdom of Poland in 1525, Angerburg/Węgobork became the seat of a district head. It was granted town rights in 1571. The Polish inhabitants called the city by its Polish name Węgobork. A large part of the town was destroyed by a fire in 1608, including a wooden church and the 20-year-old town hall.

Being situated in Masuria, in the transition area with the ethnographic region of Lithuania Minor, Węgobork/Angerburg had a Polish majority with sizable minorities of Germans and Lithuanians. The town suffered from the Swedish-Polish Wars, attacks by the Tatars, and plague epidemics, the last outbreak of which occurred in 1710 and claimed 1,111 victims. To help repopulate the town, 48 people from Salzburg, Austria were resettled here in 1732. The Lithuanian minority diminished after the 16th and 17th centuries, while Poles still formed the majority of the district's population in the early 19th century (52% in 1825).

=== Kingdom of Prussia ===
Angerburg became part of the Kingdom of Prussia in 1701 and was named a garrison town of the Prussian Army in 1718. A harbor was built on the Angerapp, allowing an aqueduct to be built in 1740, as well as an expansion of the garrison to include ten barracks. A water supply system was built in 1740 by Jan Władysław Suchodolec. Angerburg had approximately 1,800 inhabitants at this time. Its inhabitants suffered from warfare, however, as Angerburg was occupied by Russian troops during the Seven Years' War. During the Napoleonic Wars, typhus was brought by Russian troops and the town was plundered by French and Polish troops.

King Stanisław Leszczyński of Poland stopped in the castle in March and May 1736.

Angerburg was included in the Prussian province of East Prussia in 1773 and became the district seat of Landkreis Angerburg in 1818. The town became part of the German Empire upon the Prussian-led unification of Germany in 1871. A teaching seminary and a deaf-mute school were opened in 1820, and the town's population increased to over 3,500. In year 1825, the county of Angerburg/Węgobork (including the town) had 24,351 inhabitants, including (by mother tongue): 12,535 (~52%) Polish, 11,756 (~42%) German and 60 Lithuanian. Between 1848 and 1858, Polish pastor and opponent of Germanisation of Masuria Jan Fryderyk Anders was a pastor of the Węgobork Lutheran Parish. Polish secret resistance was active and smuggled weapons through the town to the Russian Partition of Poland during the January Uprising. In November 1864, local resistance leader Albert Mahler was arrested by the Prussians.

The canalization of the Angerapp and the expansion of the harbor in 1856 allowed business to expand, and the garrison left the town in 1858. The district court and the office of the public prosecutor moved from Angerburg to Lyck (Ełk) after the Kreistag, or district parliament, hindered the connection of the town to developing road network and railways. Four annual fairs and two weekly markets were held in the town in the late 19th century. Angerburg was first connected to the railroad network in 1898, allowing it to develop into a trade center. The town became especially known for its Behindertenanstalt Bethesda, an institute for those with intellectual disability.

=== World Wars ===
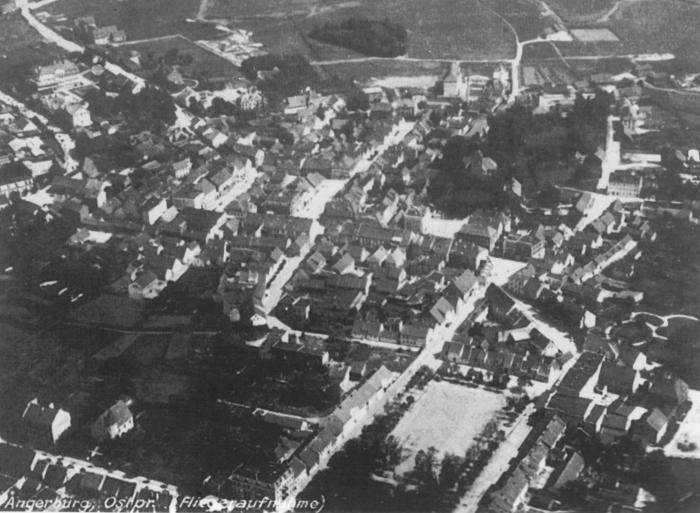
Aerial view of the town in the early 20th century

Angerburg became a garrison town again after the outbreak of World War I (1914–18), when it had a population of 5,800 inhabitants. The German-Russian military cemetery Jägerhöhe was located nearby. The war did not impact the town greatly, and Angerburg grew through new housing developments afterwards. Angerburg also began to develop through tourism after the opening of the Angerapp to regular navigation. At the beginning of the Third Reich, the town had a population of 7,700 which profited from a local cavalry regiment. Through incorporation of neighboring communities, Angerburg expanded to include 10,922 inhabitants in 1939.

Like the rest of East Prussia, Angerburg was initially only indirectly affected by World War II (1939–45), such as casualties of war and supply shortages. This situation changed as the eastern front grew near during the winter of 1944-45. Unlike the neighboring town of Gołdap to the east, Angerburg was not involved in fighting, but was given up by the Wehrmacht as the Soviet Red Army advanced. After the Red Army reached Elbing (Elbląg) and cut off East Prussia from the rest of Germany, the citizens of Angerburg were forced to evacuate the province by traveling across the Vistula Lagoon or to Pillau. The Red Army reached Angerburg on January 25, 1945 and destroyed much of the town; only a few buildings remained of the old town center.

=== Modern Poland ===
Under the terms of the post-war Potsdam Conference, the town became part of Poland and was renamed Węgorzewo.

Węgorzewo initially suffered economically after the fall of the Iron Curtain and the Revolutions of 1989, but has become a popular tourist site in the Masurian Lake District. The town is famous for the music festivals which take place in summertime, including a rock festival, a sailors' song festival, and a poetic song festival.

== Notable residents ==
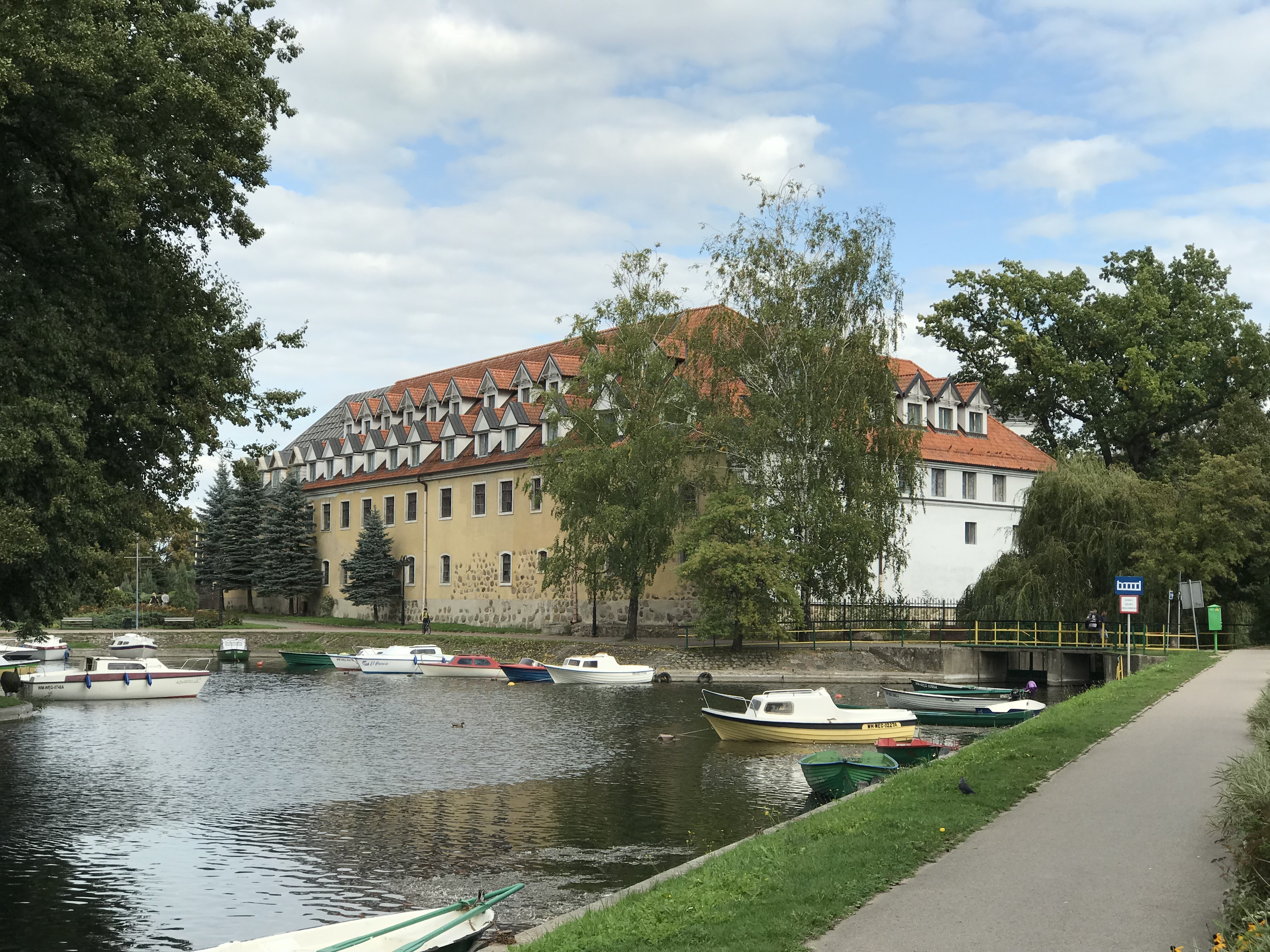
Węgorzewo Castle and the Angrapa River

- Albrycht Zaborowski (1638–1711), Polish emigrant, one of the pioneers of European colonization within the area of present-day New Jersey
- Georg Andreas Helwing (1666–1748), botanist
- Siegfried Heinrich Aronhold (1819–1884), mathematician
- Rodolphe Radau (1835–1911), astronomer
- Kurt Haehling (1893–1983), Wehrmacht general
- Martin Sommerfeld (1894–1939), Jewish emigre to the U.S. and university lecturer
- Herbert Jankuhn (1905–1990), archaeologist
- Klaus Ewerth (1907–1943), Kriegsmarine officer
- Andreas Hillgruber (1925–1989), historian
- Bożena Ksiąźek (born 1963), Polish sprint canoer
- Mariusz Duda (born 1975), Polish musician
- Patryk Kun (born 1995), Polish footballer
- Y the Magician (born 1991), Polish magician

== International relations ==
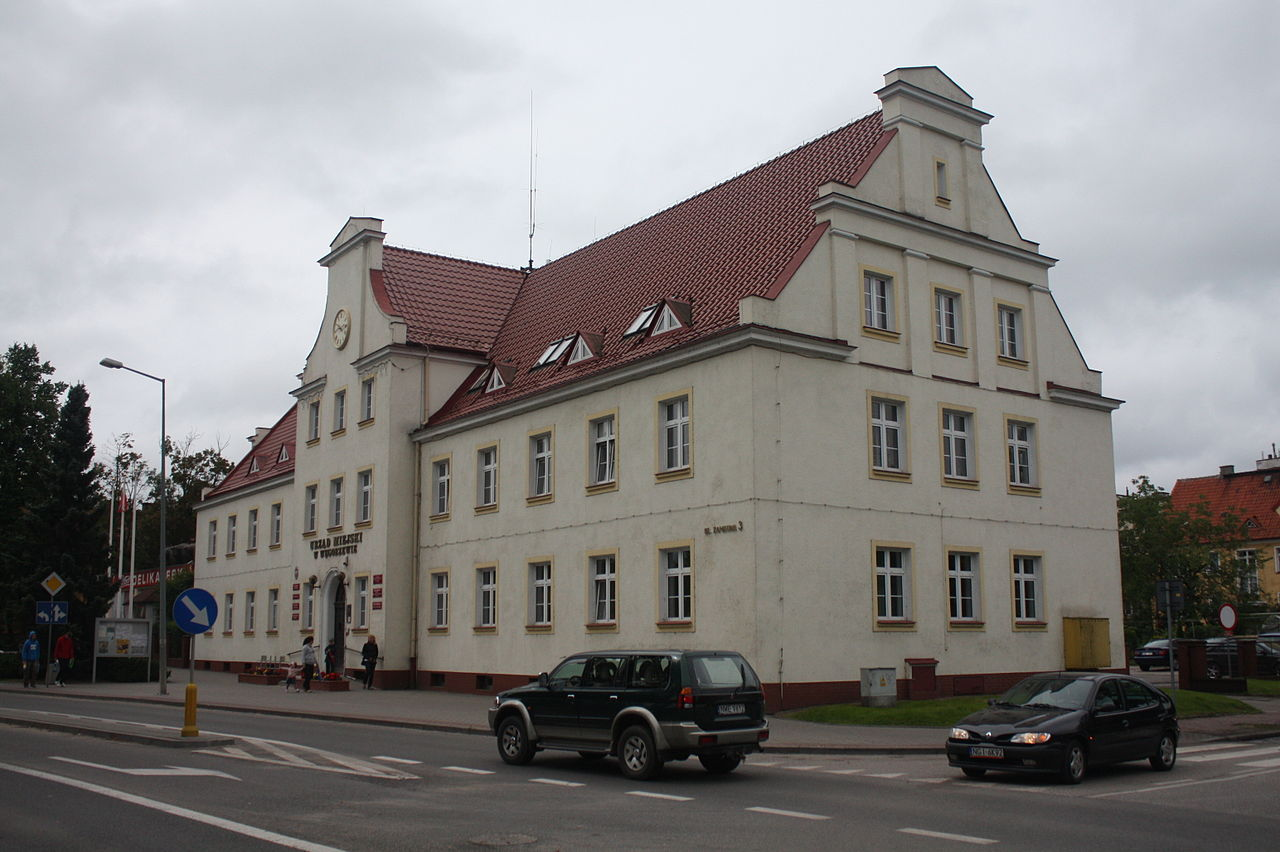
Town Hall

Węgorzewo is a member of Cittaslow.

=== Twin towns — Sister cities ===
Węgorzewo is twinned with:

Leffrinckoucke in France; Yavoriv in Ukraine	Chernyakhovsk in Russia; Nemenčinė in Lithuania
