= Gmina Węgorzewo =

Gmina Węgorzewo Węgorzewo Commune
- Gmina
- Coat of arms
- Interactive map of Gmina Węgorzewo
- Coordinates (Węgorzewo): 54°13′N 21°45′E
- Country: Poland
- Voivodeship: Warmian-Masurian
- County: Węgorzewo
- Seat: Węgorzewo

Area
  - Total: 341.11 km^{2} (131.70 sq mi)

Population (2006)
  - Total: 17,092
  - Density: 50.107/km^{2} (129.78/sq mi)
  - Urban: 11,638
  - Rural: 5,454
- Website: http://www.wegorzewo.pl

Gmina Węgorzewo is an urban-rural gmina (administrative district) in Węgorzewo County, Warmian-Masurian Voivodeship, in northern Poland, on the border with Russia. Its seat is the town of Węgorzewo, which lies approximately 95 kilometres (59 mi) north-east of the regional capital Olsztyn.

The gmina covers an area of 341.11 square kilometres (131.7 sq mi), and as of 2006 its total population is 17,092 (out of which the population of Węgorzewo amounts to 11,638, and the population of the rural part of the gmina is 5,454).

== Villages ==
Apart from the town of Węgorzewo, Gmina Węgorzewo contains the villages and settlements of Biedaszki, Brzozowo, Czerwony Dwór, Dąbrówka Mała, Dłużec, Dowiackie Nowiny, Guja, Jakunowo, Janówko, Jerzykowo, Kal, Kalskie Nowiny, Kamień, Kamionek Wielki, Karłowo, Kietlice, Klimki, Kolonia Rybacka, Łabapa, Łęgwarowo, Maćki, Mamerki, Matyski, Nowa Guja, Ogonki, Parowa, Pasternak, Perły, Pilwa, Pniewo, Prynowo, Przystań, Radzieje, Róże, Różewiec, Rudziszki, Ruska Wieś, Rydzówka, Skrzypy, Sobin, Stawiska, Stawki, Stręgiel, Stulichy, Surwile, Sztynort, Sztynort Mały, Tarławki, Trygort, Węgielsztyn, Wesołowo, Wilkowo, Wysiecza, Zacisz, Zacisze and Zielony Ostrów.

== Neighbouring gminas ==
Gmina Węgorzewo is bordered by the gminas of Budry, Giżycko, Kętrzyn, Pozezdrze and Srokowo. It also borders Russia (Kaliningrad oblast).
