= Węgorzewo County =

Węgorzewo County Powiat węgorzewski
- County
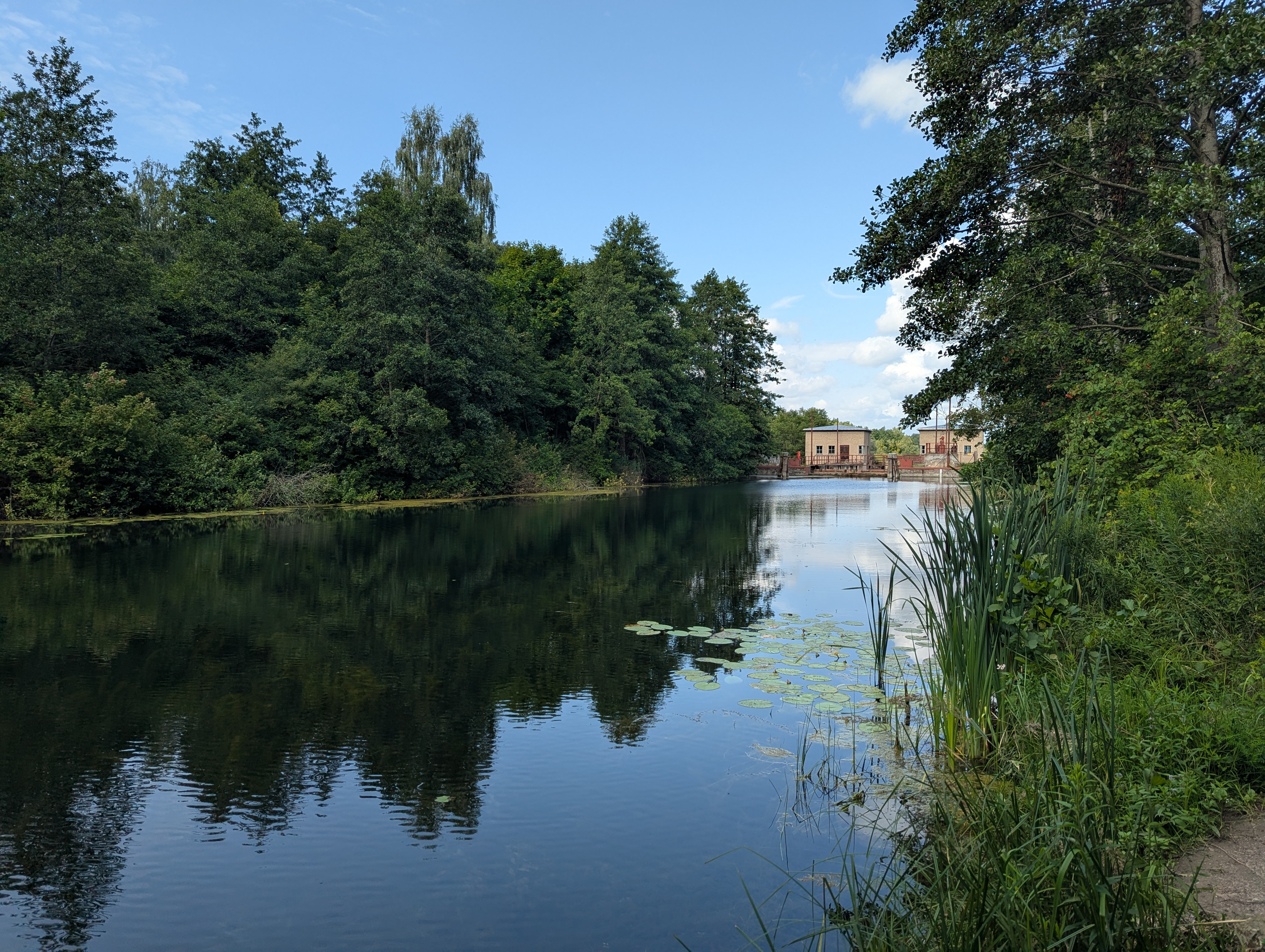
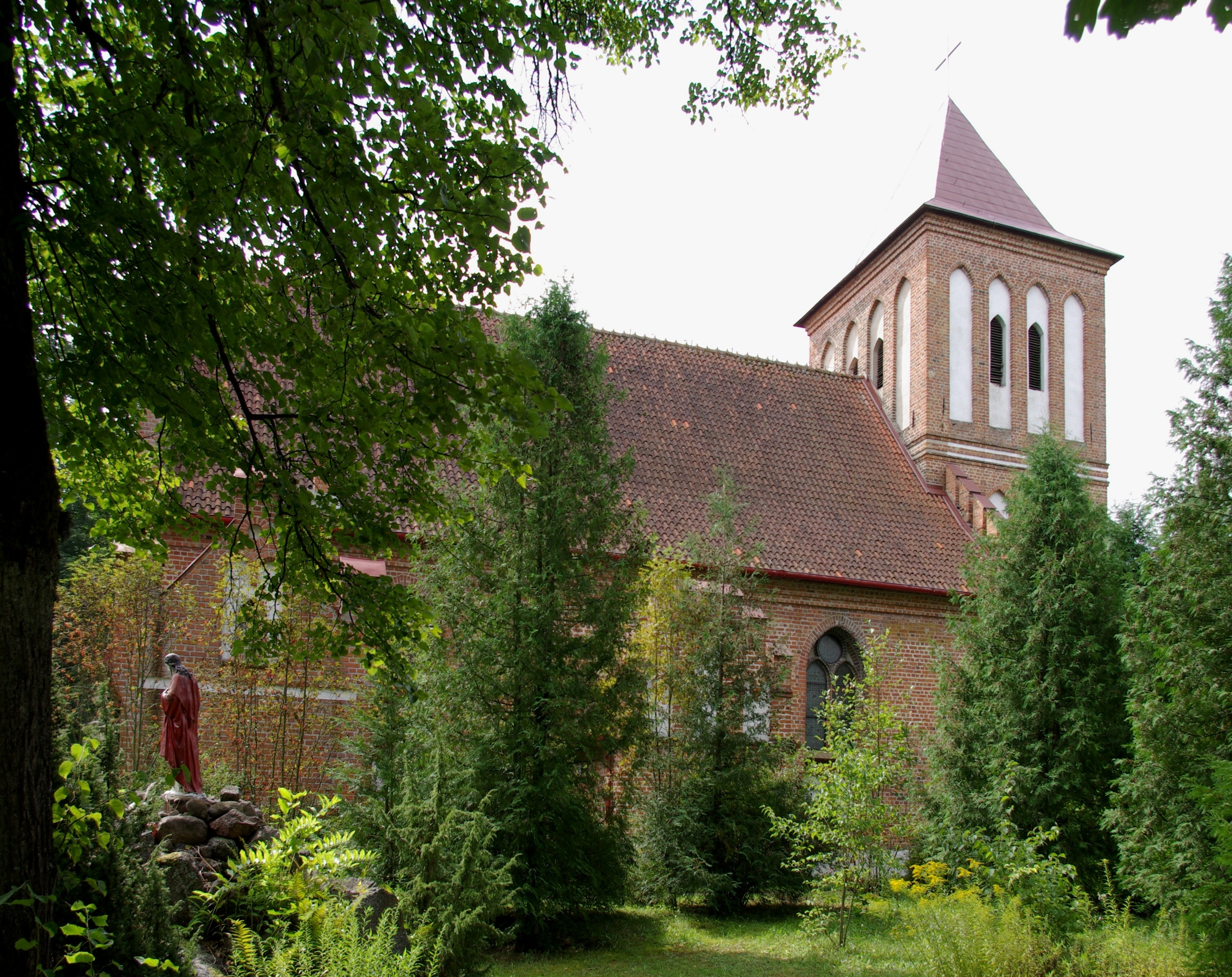
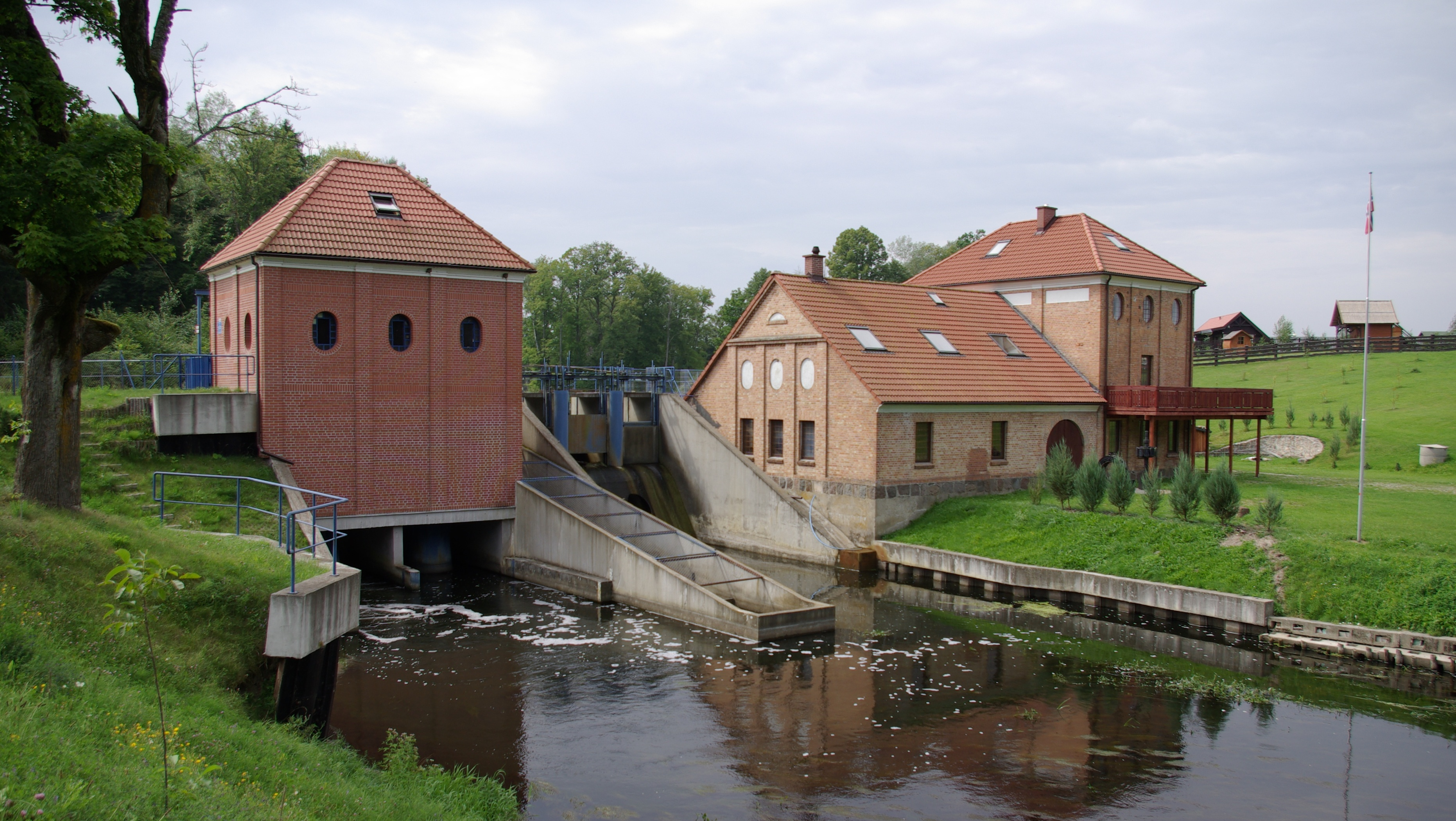
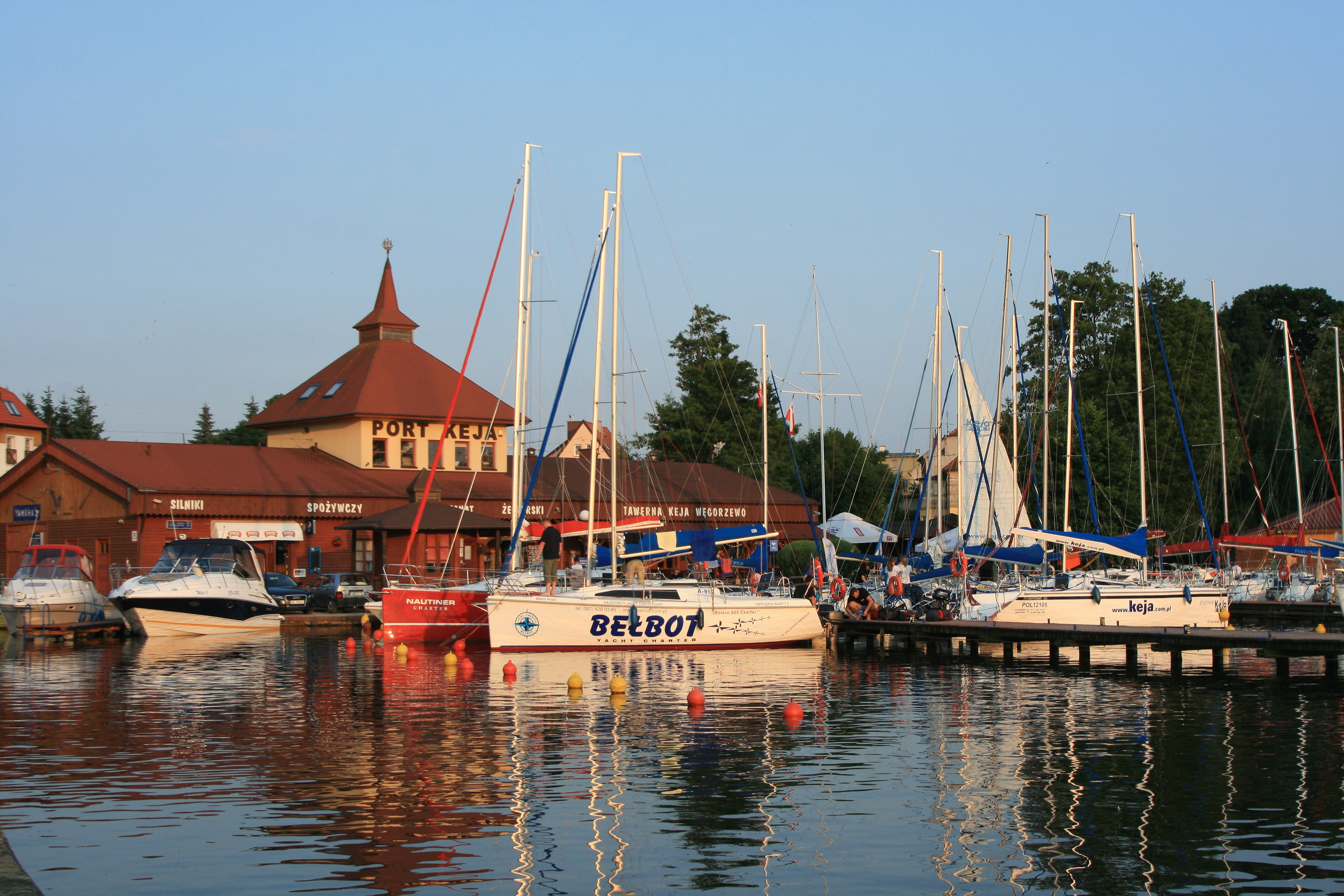
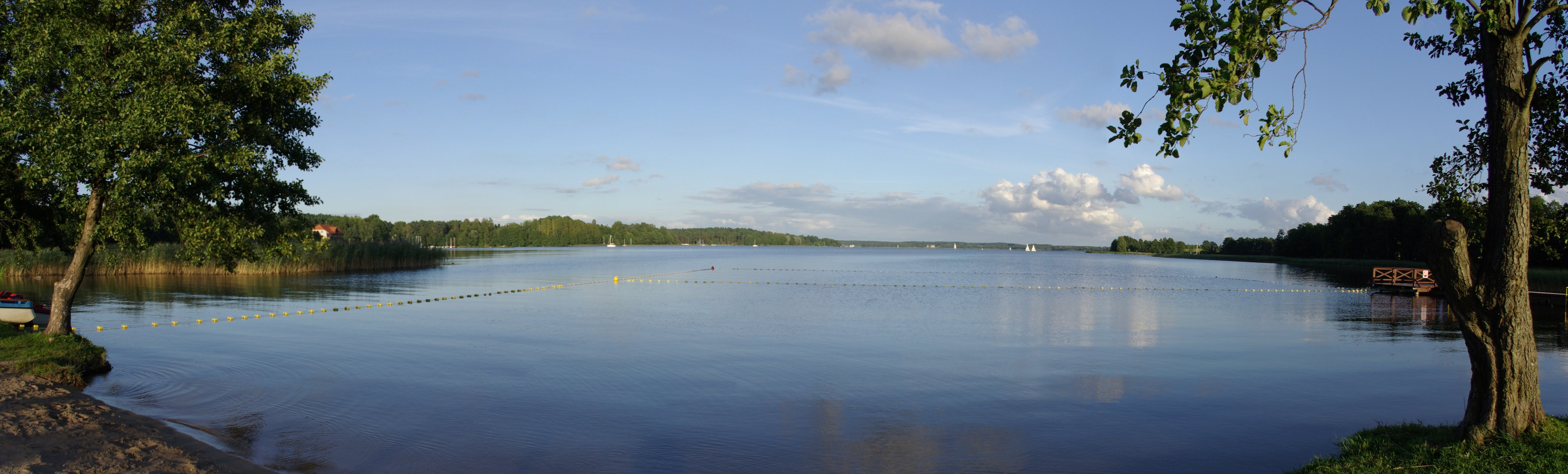
- Masurian Canal in Guja Maximilian Kolbe church in Kuty Hydroelectric power plant in Ołownik Węgorzewo marina Lake Święcajty

- Flag Coat of arms

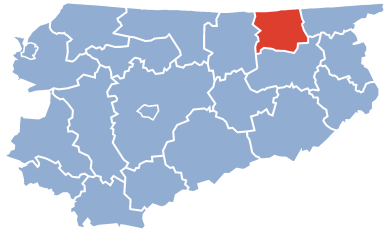
- Location within the voivodeship

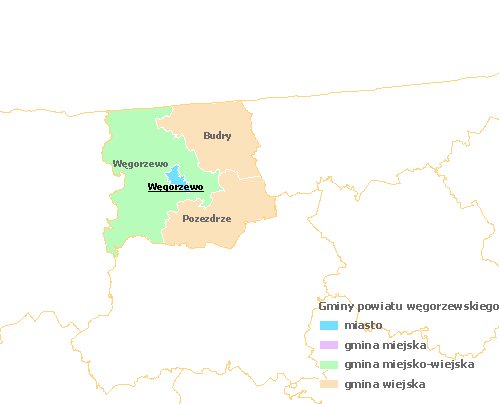
- Division into gminas
- Coordinates (Węgorzewo): 54°13′N 21°45′E
- Country: Poland
- Voivodeship: Warmian-Masurian
- Seat: Węgorzewo
- Gminas: Total 3: Gmina Budry; Gmina Pozezdrze; Gmina Węgorzewo

Area
  - Total: 693.43 km^{2} (267.73 sq mi)

Population (2024)
  - Total: 20,703
  - Density: 29.856/km^{2} (77.327/sq mi)
  - Urban: 10,488
  - Rural: 10,140
- Time zone: UTC+1 (CET)
  - Summer (DST): UTC+2 (CEST)
- Car plates: NWE
- Website: www.powiatwegorzewski.pl

Węgorzewo County (Polish: powiat węgorzewski) is a unit of territorial administration and local government (powiat) in Warmian-Masurian Voivodeship, north-eastern Poland, on the border with Russia. It was created in 2002 out of the northern part of Giżycko County. Its administrative seat and only town is Węgorzewo, which lies 95 kilometres (59 mi) north-east of the regional capital Olsztyn.

The county covers an area of 693.43 square kilometres (267.7 sq mi). As of 2024 its total population is 20,703, out of which the population of Węgorzewo is 10,488 and the rural population is 10,140.

== Neighbouring counties ==
Węgorzewo County is bordered by Gołdap County to the east, Giżycko County to the south and Kętrzyn County to the west. It also borders Russia (Kaliningrad Oblast) to the north.

== Administrative division ==
The county is subdivided into three gminas (one urban-rural and two rural). These are listed in the following table, in descending order of population.

Gmina	Type	Area (km^{2})	Population (2024)	Seat
Gmina Węgorzewo	urban-rural	341.1	15,213	Węgorzewo
Gmina Pozezdrze	rural	177.3	2,966	Pozezdrze
Gmina Budry	rural	175.0	2,524	Budry
