= Saranskoe =

Saranskoe Саранское
- Rural locality
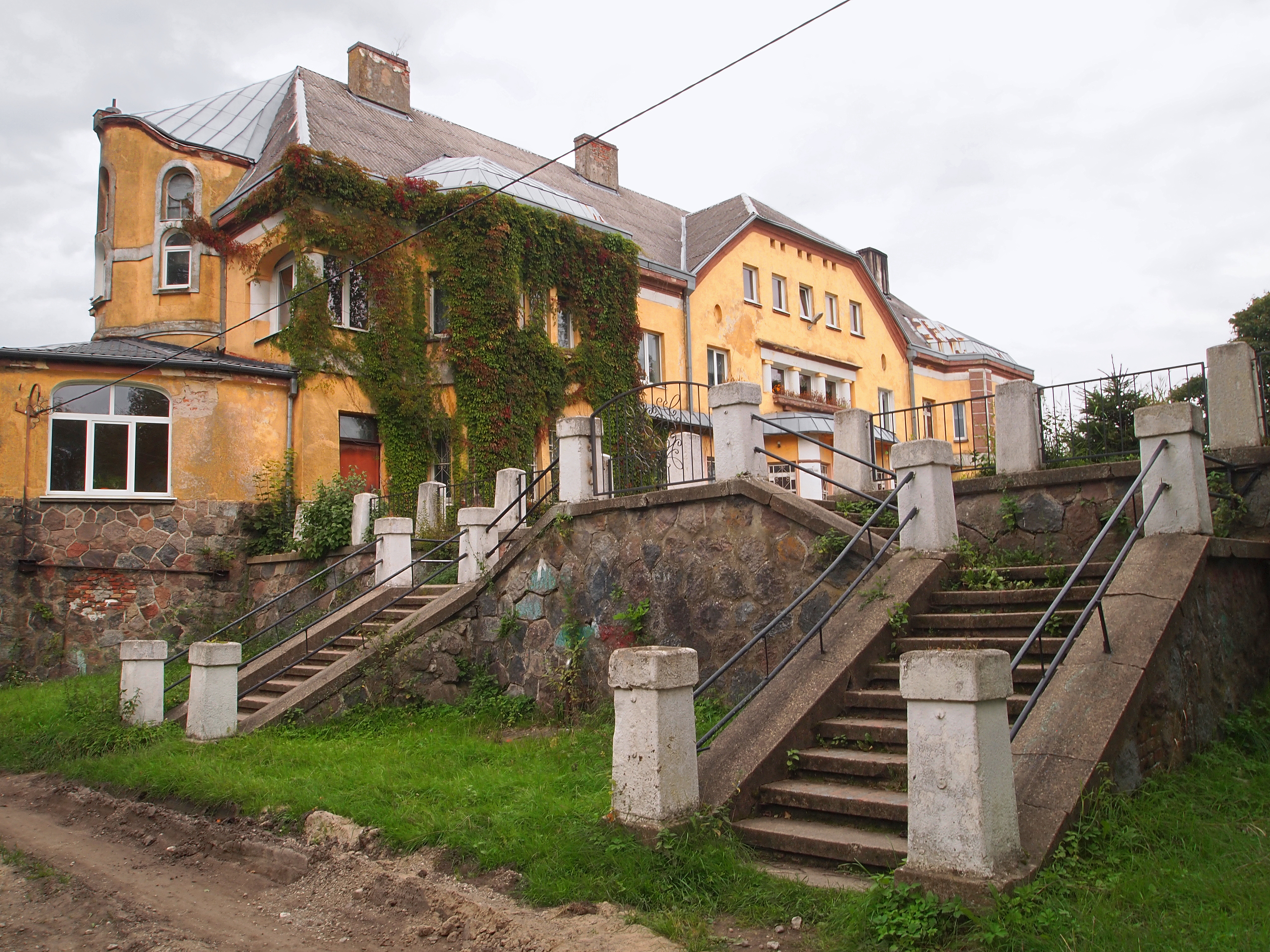
- Palace in Saranskoe
- Interactive map of Saranskoe
- Location of Saranskoe Saranskoe (European Russia) Saranskoe (Russia)
- Coordinates: 54°50′N 21°14′E
- Country: Russia
- Federal subject: Kaliningrad Oblast
- Administrative district: Polessky District
- First mentioned: 1258

Population (2010 Census)
  - Total: 988
  - Estimate (2013): 1,055 (+6.8%)
- Time zone: UTC+2 (MSK–1)
- Postal code: 238640
- OKTMO ID: 27718000301

Saranskoe, Saranskoye (Russian: Сара́нское; German: Laukischken, Лаукишкен; Lithuanian: Laukiška; Polish: Łaukiszki) is a rural locality (selo) in Kaliningrad Oblast. It lies approximately 11 kilometres (7 mi) east of Polessk.

== History ==
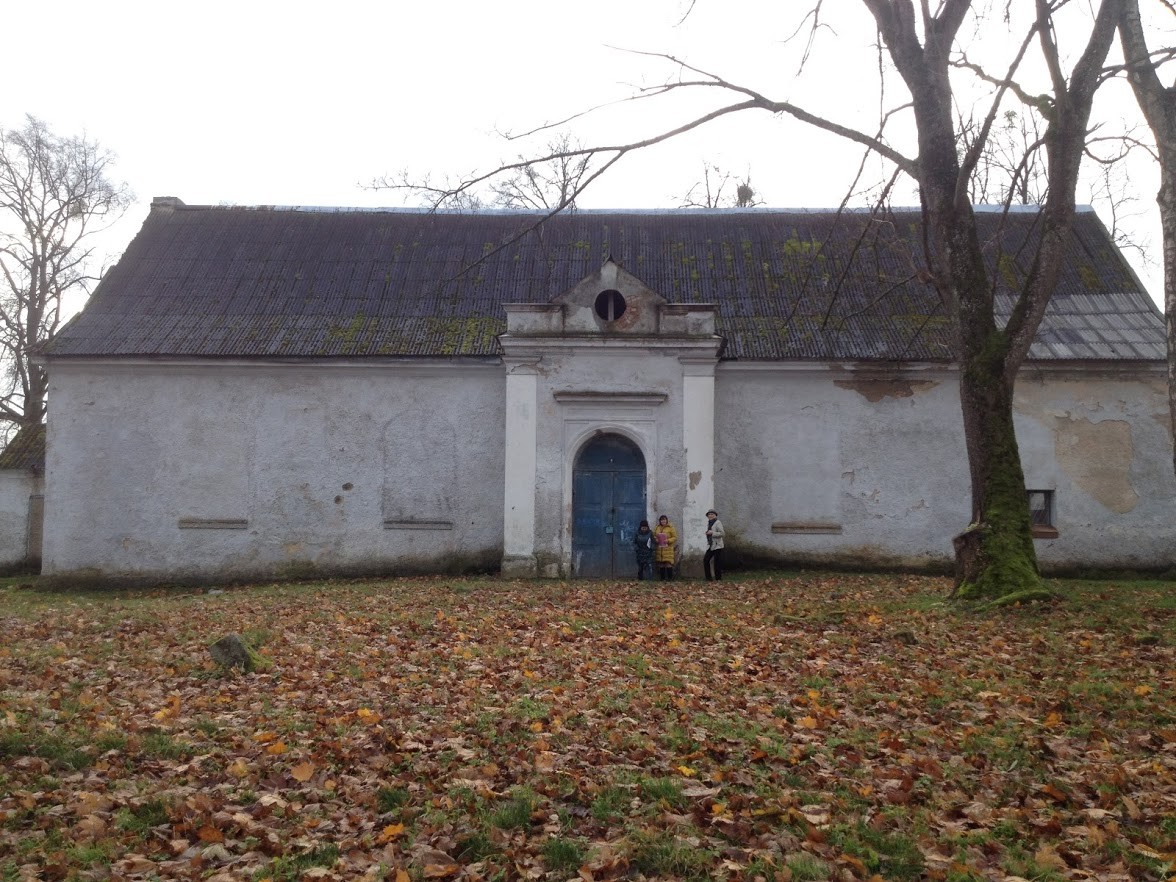
Old church

The settlement was first mentioned in 1258. In 1454, the region was incorporated by King Casimir IV Jagiellon to the Kingdom of Poland upon the request of the anti-Teutonic Prussian Confederation. After the subsequent Thirteen Years' War, since 1466, it formed part of Poland as a fief held by the Teutonic Order, and from 1525 held by Ducal Prussia. From the 18th century it was part of the Kingdom of Prussia, and from 1871 to 1945 it was also part of Germany, within which it was administratively located in the Landkreis Labiau/Kreis Labiau (district) in the Province of East Prussia. In the late 19th century, the village had a population of 416, entirely Lithuanian-speaking and Lutheran by confession. Lithuanian church services were held in the local church.

Following World War II, it passed to the Soviet Union.

== Notable people ==
- Rogalla von Bieberstein (de)
- Gustav Glogau
- Herbert W. Roesky
