= History of the Bydgoszcz water junction =

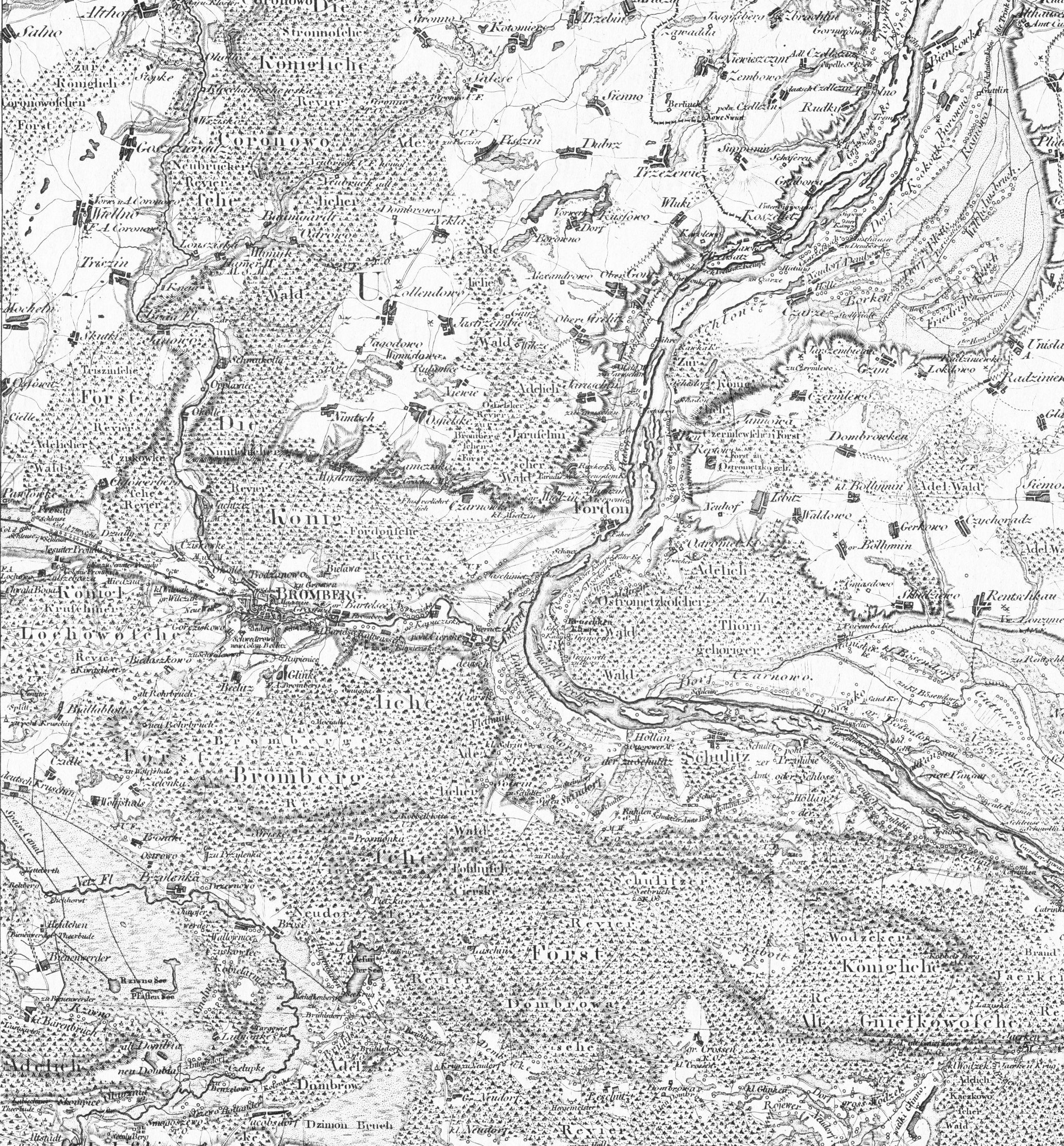
The surroundings of Bydgoszcz on a map by Friedrich von Schrötter from 1796–1802. The Brda was not canalized, the Vistula was not regulated, and the Bydgoszcz Canal had just been built.

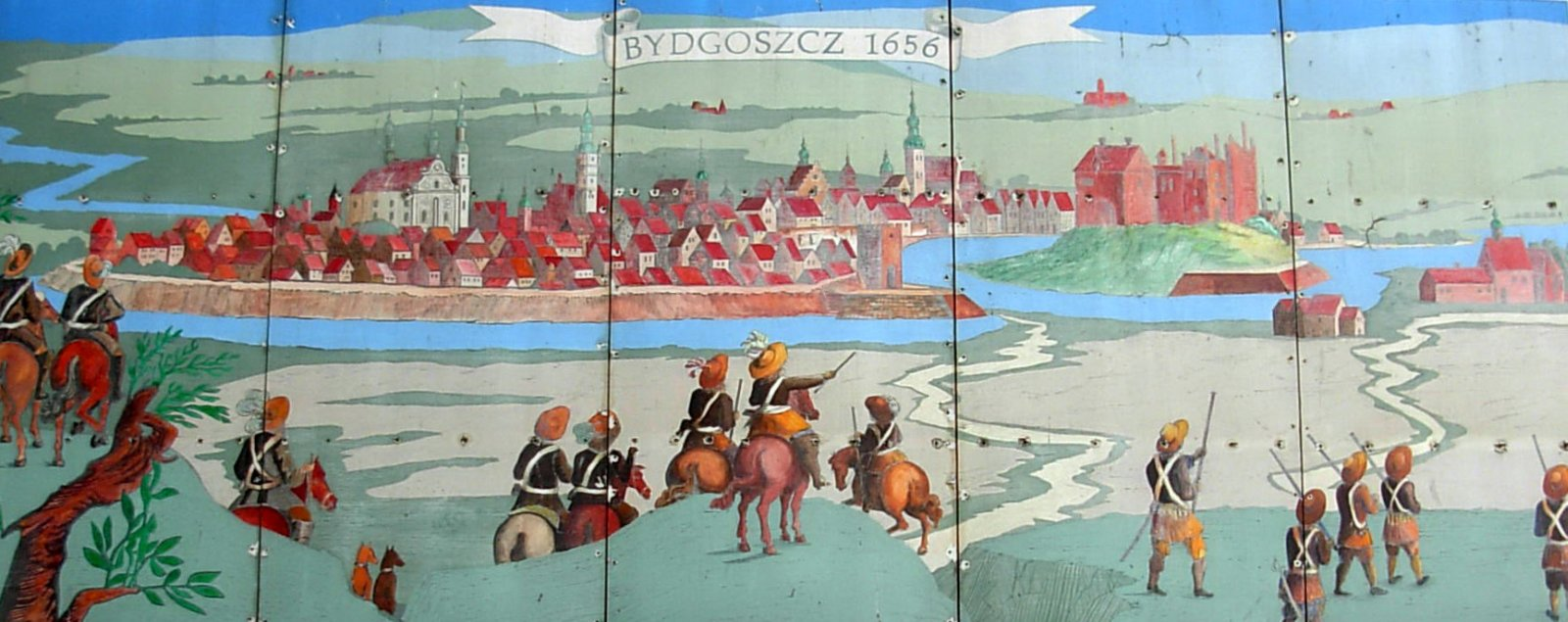
Panorama of Bydgoszcz in 1657 based on an engraving by Swedish officer Erik Dahlbergh

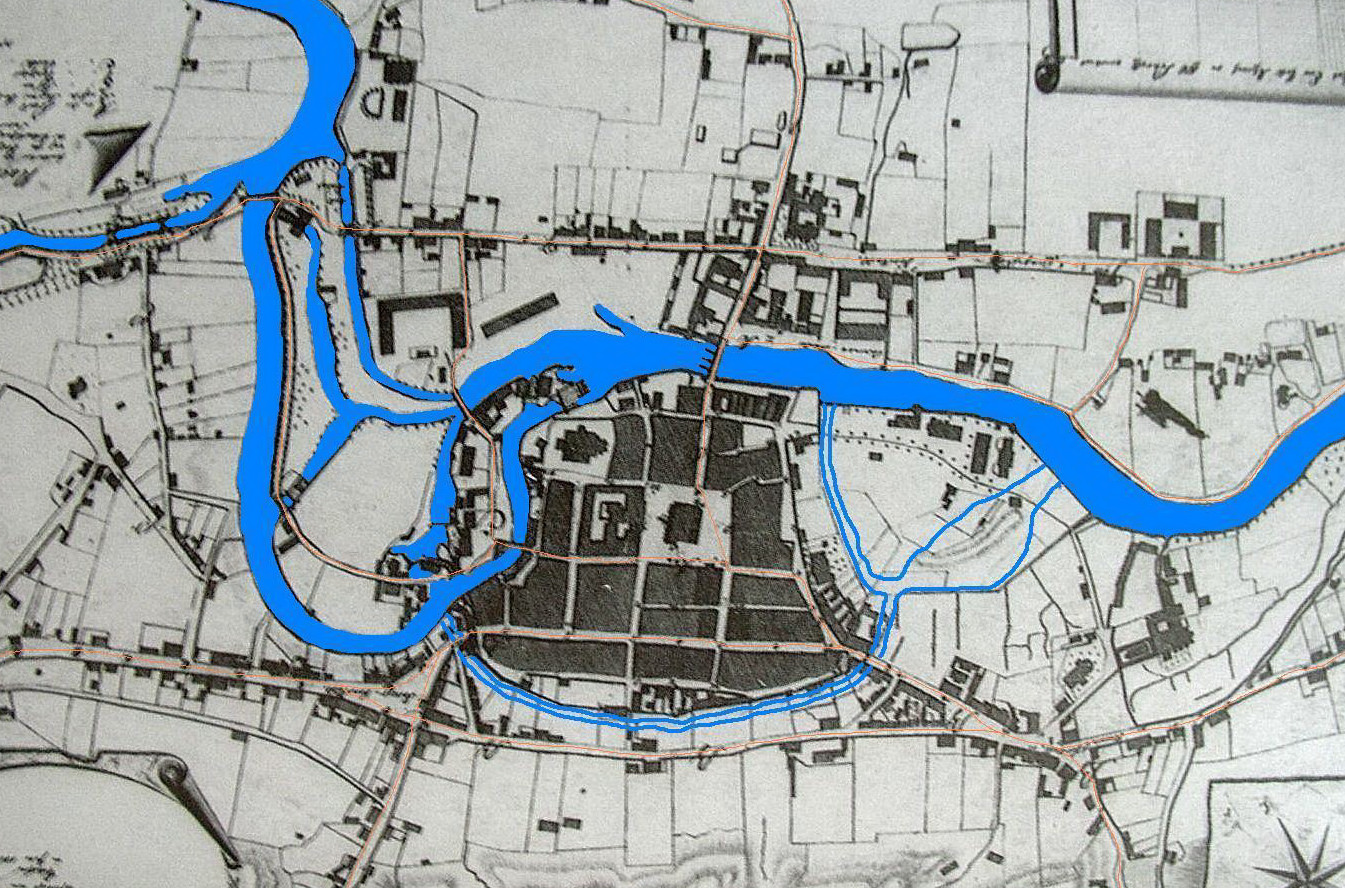
Bydgoszcz in 1800, surrounded by waterways based on Lieutenant Lindner's plan

The history of the Bydgoszcz water junction concerns the transformations of the watercourses converging in Bydgoszcz, the history of water transport on them, and their use for tourism, sport, and recreation.

== Geological history ==
The nodal system of the water network around Bydgoszcz was formed during the Pomeranian glaciation. At that time, a latitudinal drainage route existed, carrying melt and river waters westward towards the North Sea. Due to erosion by flowing waters, the Toruń-Eberswalde Urstromtal (glacial valley) was shaped. About 12,000 years ago, when the proto-Vistula broke through the Fordon Vistula Gorge, the westward flow stopped, causing the valley in this section to become swampy and peat-filled. Near the western city limits, a watershed between the Oder and Vistula basins formed. The two main rivers of the region, Brda and Noteć, belonging to different basins, came close to each other near Bydgoszcz—about 10 km apart—but flowed in opposite directions. The Noteć flowed northwest along the southern glacial valley route, characterized by a wide, peat-filled bed. Meanwhile, the Brda descended from the north, cutting about 35 m into the former sandur valley, then after reaching the Toruń-Eberswalde Urstromtal, carved about 20 m into its bed, flowing east toward the Vistula. At the place where the Brda changed direction from north to east, there was a ford, near which in the 11th century the Bydgoszcz stronghold was founded, later developing into a town whose existence was largely based on rafting. The location of Bydgoszcz near the watershed between the Vistula and Oder predisposed this place to the construction of a junction linking both basins, which was realized as soon as technical possibilities appeared.

== Historical topography ==
=== Brda in the 11th–19th centuries ===
Until the regulation works in the 19th century, Brda and Vistula were natural rivers with variable flow and water levels. Brda until the end of the 19th century was known as a river rich in Atlantic salmon, as well as European eels and trout. On the riverbanks from Koronowo to the mouth into the Vistula, European beavers built lodges — in the 17th century, Bydgoszcz fishermen hunted them. Since the 11th century, the water level steadily rose, reaching its maximum in the 14th century. Even in the 19th century, the annual amplitude of river level fluctuations reached up to 6 m.

Navigation on the Brda existed already before the 11th century, evidenced by boat remains and harbors found near the Bydgoszcz stronghold. In the 15th century, large Vistula ships started arriving at the town, covering the about 10 km distance from Brdyujście to the city port.

=== Vistula near Bydgoszcz in the 11th–19th centuries ===
Vistula near a bend close to Bydgoszcz had a braided, partly anastomosing character from prehistoric times until the mid-19th century. Migrating sandbanks caused changes in riverbed depths, creating branches, islands, and sandy bars. The section from the mouth of the Brda to Wyszogród was least different from the present-day river, while below Fordon, Bydgoszcz, the Vistula split into two riverbeds, separated by Vistula islands. The main current flowed through the western branch (now extinct). The width of the river in today's Bydgoszcz section ranged from 500 to 1350 m at the widest point below Fordon.

On the high western bank, allowing good river observation, a castellany and princely fortress Wyszogród was founded in the 11th century. Until its destruction by the Teutonic Order in 1330, it was, alongside the Bydgoszcz stronghold, the main settlement center at the border of Kuyavia and Pomerania. In the layout of islets and river channels near the Rudolf Modrzejewski Fordon Bridge, according to Sebastian Klonowic, there was a stony reef, infamous among rafters. In the Bydgoszcz bend, Klonowic recorded in 1595 three main Vistula islands: Łęski (opposite Łęgnowo, Bydgoszcz), Fordański (Kępa Bydlęca), and Pełźniński (below Fordon, Bydgoszcz, opposite the village Pałcz).

Near Brdyujście until the 18th century, there was the island "Stara Dbrzyca", later transformed into a peninsula. In 1382, in the founding document of Władysław Opolczyk, five islands on the Vistula were incorporated into the patrimony of the town of Fordon, Bydgoszcz. According to Schrötter's 1803 map, about 20 islands lay in the Vistula channel from Otorowo to Łoskoń.

=== Vistula Bend ===
A topographical and cultural distinctive feature of Bydgoszcz, inspiring writers and painters, is its unique location on the so-called "elbow of the Vistula", where the river leaves the Toruń-Eberswalde Urstromtal making a breakthrough through the Pomeranian Lake District.
