= Landkreis Allenstein =

District of Prussia

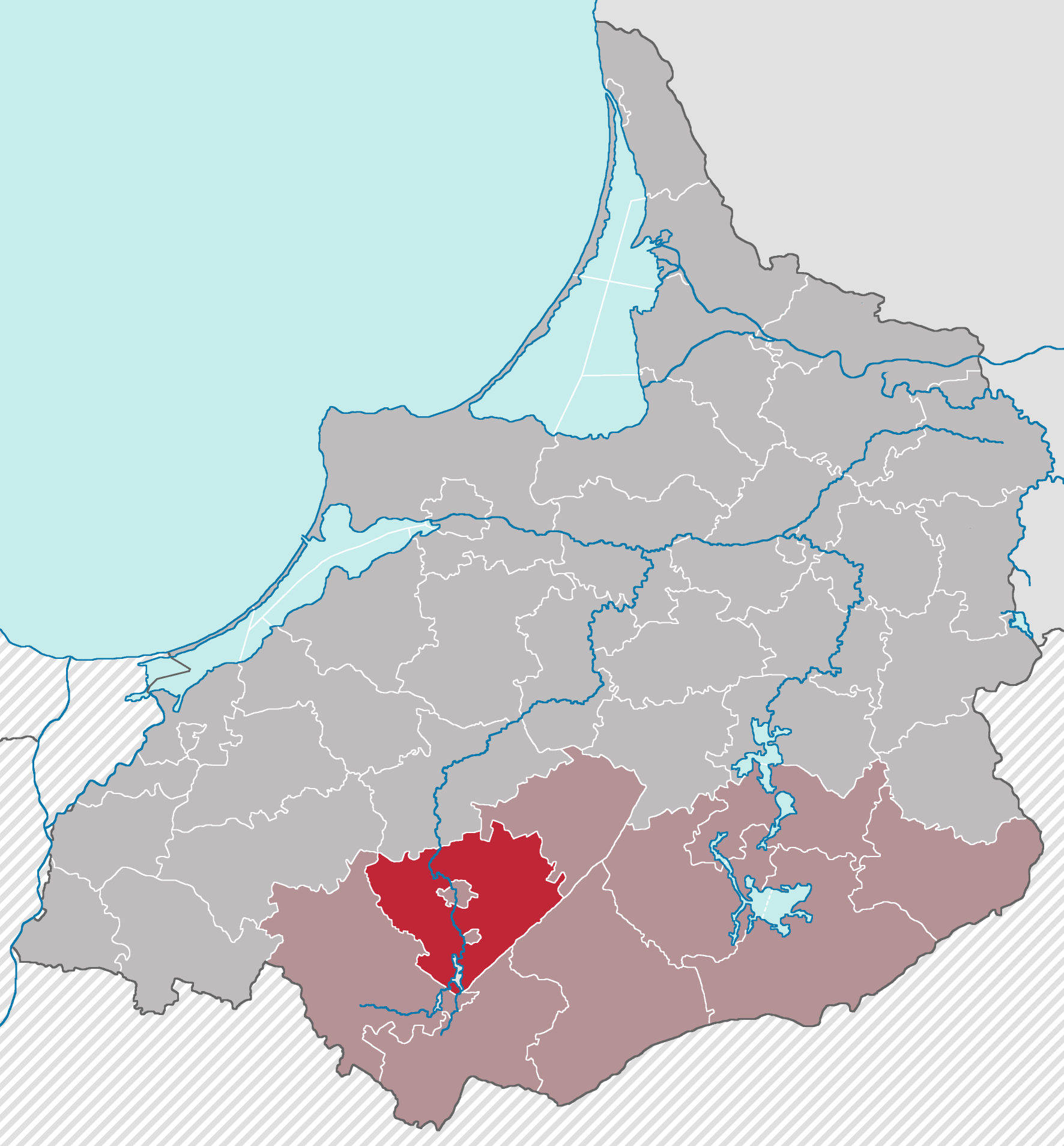
Location of Landkreis Allenstein within East Prussia (1920-1939)

The district of Allenstein was a Prussian district in East Prussia, which existed from 1818 to 1945.

== History ==
The area of the Allenstein district historically belonged to the Prince-Bishopric of Warmia, which fell to the Kingdom of Prussia with the First Partition of Poland in 1772. After the incorporation of Warmia into Prussia, the districts of Braunsberg and Heilsberg were set up in 1773, both of which were assigned to the Königsberg War and Domain Chamber.

As part of the Prussian administrative reforms, a comprehensive district reform in all of East Prussia was necessary, as the districts established in 1752 and 1773 had proven to be inexpedient and too large. In Warmia, the new Allenstein district was formed from the southwestern part of the old Heilsberg district on February 1, 1818. The Allenstein district was assigned to Regierungsbezirk Königsberg, which emerged in 1808 from the old Königsberg War and Domain Chamber.

Since 1871, the district belonged to the German Empire. On November 1, 1905, the Allenstein district was assigned to the new Regierungsbezirk Allenstein. On April 1, 1910, the city of Allenstein left the district and formed its own urban district, known as Stadtkreis Allenstein. The remainder of the Allenstein district has since been referred to as Landkreis Allenstein.

In the 1920 East Prussian plebiscite, the Allenstein district belonged to the Allenstein voting area, the residents of which were to vote on whether they wished to join Poland or remain in Germany, in accordance with the provisions of the Treaty of Versailles. In the plebiscite, 86.53% of the votes were in favor of Germany and 13.47% were in favour of Poland, due to which it remained in Germany.

Towards the end of World War II in January 1945, the district was occupied by the Soviet Red Army and placed under Polish administration, in accordance with the Potsdam Agreement. The German residents of the district were expelled and only about 7% of the inhabitants, classified as "autochthonous Poles" were allowed to remain.

== Demographics ==
According to the Prussian census of 1861, the Allenstein district, which then also included the city of Allenstein, had a population of 47,901, of which 12,510 (26.1%) were Germans and 35,391 (73.9%) were Poles.
