= Landkreis Heydekrug =

Administrative Entity of East Prussia, Now Lithuania Minor

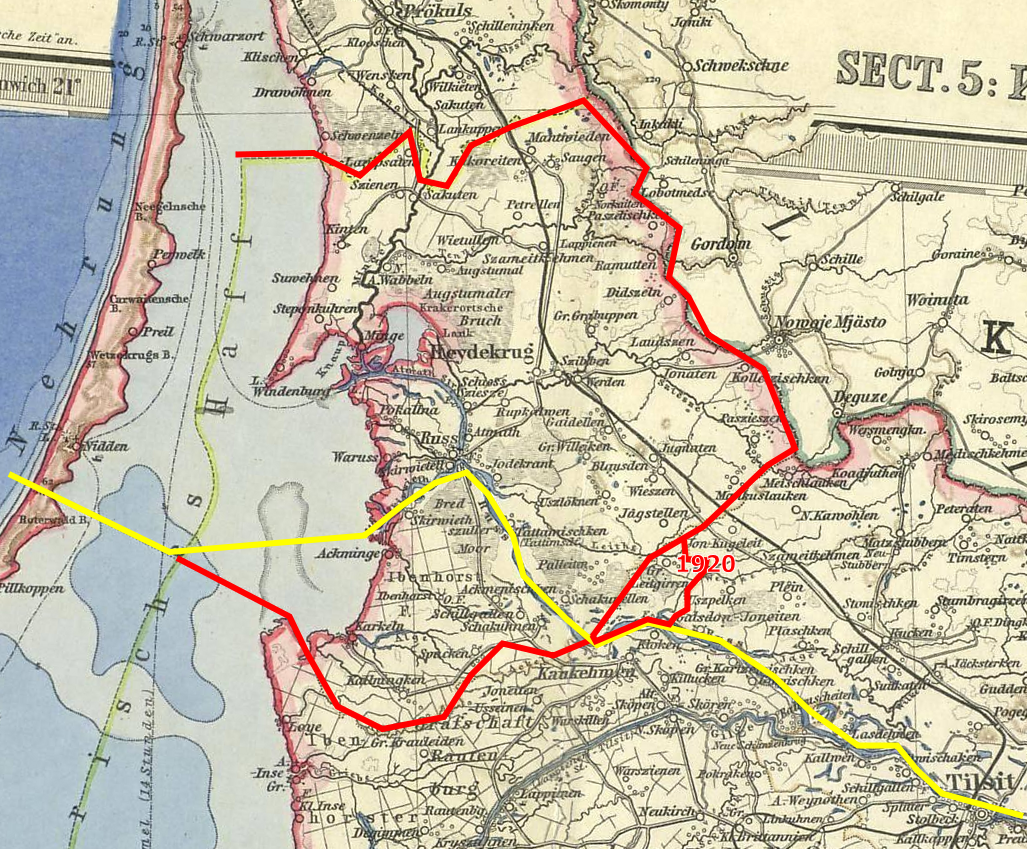

Landkreis Heydekrug (1818–1945) was an administrative territorial entity of East Prussia, located in Lithuania Minor. It was part of Regierungsbezirk Gumbinnen.

The seat was in Heydekrug (modern Šilutė). In 1913, Karkeln and surrounding inland towns (those south of the yellow line in the map) were administratively transferred to Kreis Niederung. After World War I, Landkreis Heydekrug and other areas north of the yellow line became part of Memel Territory administered by Lithuania.

From 1945 to 1990, the area belonged to the Soviet Union, the southern part to the Kaliningrad Oblast, and the northern part to the Lithuanian SSR. Today, the northern part belongs to Lithuania and the southern part belongs to the Slavsky District of the Kaliningrad Oblast, Russia.

== Geography ==
The district was in Prussian Lithuania, on the Curonian Lagoon. The nearest major cities were Memel and Tilsit.

== Demographics ==
The district had a Lithuanian majority, with a significant German minority.

Population by language in Heydekrug district
Year	Population	German		Lithuanian	
1825	22,948	6,446	28.09%	16,502	71.91%
1831	23,267	6,542	28.12%	16,725	71.88%
1834	25,218	7,106	28.18%	18,112	71.82%
1849	31,399	10,243	32.62%	21,124	67.28%
1858	35,244	12,338	35.01%	22,870	64.89%
1861	36,528	13,459	36.85%	23,054	63.11%
