= Herbert W. Roesky =

German chemist (1935–2025)

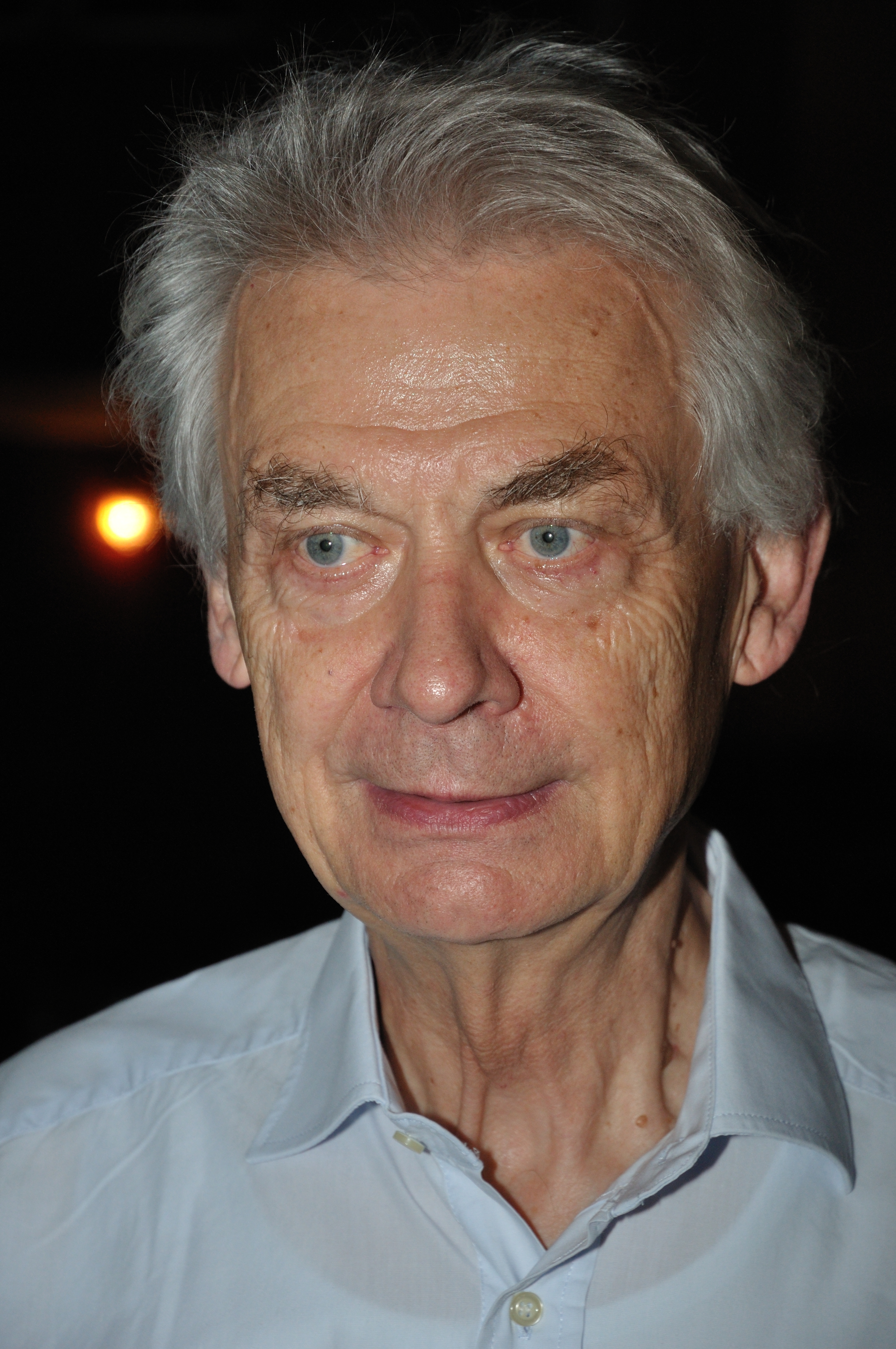
- Roesky in 2011
- Born: 6 November 1935; Laukischken, Gau East Prussia, Germany
- Died: 5 December 2025 (aged 90)
- Education: University of Göttingen
- Scientific career
- Fields: Chemistry

Herbert Walter Roesky (6 November 1935 – 5 December 2025) was a German inorganic chemist.

== Life and career ==
Roesky was born in Laukischken, Gau East Prussia, the son of Otto and Lina Roesky, who ran a dairy. The family fled East Prussia for Seesen during World War II, later settling in the Harz region where Roesky graduated from high school in 1956. He began an apprenticeship as a dairy specialist, but soon enrolled at the Georg-August University Göttingen, where he obtained his doctorate in inorganic chemistry under Oskar Glemser in 1963. Following a postdoc at Du Pont in the United States with Earl Muetterties, he completed his habilitation from his alma mater in 1967, then began his teaching career, retiring in 2004.

Roesky was primarily known for his pioneering work on fluorides of both transition and p-block metals. He was a visiting professor at Jawaharlal Nehru Centre for Advanced Scientific Research, Bangalore, Tokyo Institute of Technology, and Kyoto University, and he was also a Frontier Lecturer at Texas A&M University at College Station, University of Texas at Austin, and University of Iowa at Iowa City. He was a member of the Academy of Sciences at Göttingen, the New York Academy of Sciences, the German Academy of Sciences Leopoldina in Halle, the Russian Academy of Sciences, Associé étranger de l’Académie des Sciences, and the Academia Europæa in London. He served as the Vice President of the German Chemical Society during 1995, and was also the President of the Academy of Sciences of Göttingen.

More than 1250 peer-reviewed papers, articles, patents, and books record his research activity in the areas of inorganic chemistry and materials science. He was also the recipient of several prizes, i.e. the prestigious Gottfried Wilhelm Leibniz Prize, the Alfred Stock Memorial Prize, the Grand Prix de la Foundation de la Maison de la Chimie, the Wilkinson Prize and ACS awards in Inorganic and Fluorine Chemistry. In 2025, Roesky was highlighted by Chemistry World as the top-predicted candidate for the Nobel Prize in Chemistry, receiving the most votes in their annual poll.

Roesky died on 5 December 2025, at the age of 90.
