= Gustav Glogau =

German philosopher

Gustav Glogau (6 June 1844, Laukischken (Kreis Labiau, Province of Prussia) - 22 March 1895, Laurion (Greece)) was a German philosopher of religion and an academic. He worked for the Technical College (1881-1883) in Zurich as a private tutor and, later, ordinarius, teaching philosophy and pedagogy subjects. He taught as a professor at the Halle University (1883-), Kiel University (1884-).

Glogau was a student of the German philologist Chajim Heymann Steinthal. The name is sometime misspelled as Gustav Grogau.

== Literary works ==
- Abriss der philosophischen Grundwissenschaften, 2 vols., 1880-1888
