= Friedrich von Schrötter =

German politician (1743–1815)

Friedrich Leopold Freiherr von Schrötter (February 1, 1743 – June 30, 1815) was a German Junker, Prussian government minister and until 1806 Reichsfreiherr of the Holy Roman Empire of the German Nation.

Schrötter was born in Wohnsdorf near Friedland (today Kurortnoye, Pravdinsky District, Kaliningrad Oblast, Russia) and served in a dragoon regiment of the Prussian Army during the Seven Years' War. Appointed as minister in charge of East Prussia after the death of King Frederick the Great, he followed the free trade economic policies then coming into vogue, loosening restrictions on the grain trade in that province. He died in Berlin.

== Legacy ==
In 1941 the Polish city of Płock, which was annexed to the Province of East Prussia after the Poland Campaign in 1939, was renamed Schröttersburg in honor of Schrötter. However, the name disappeared soon after the end of the Second World War.
