= Kreis Labiau =

Former district in East Prussia (1818–1945)

Kreis Labiau was a district in East Prussia that existed from 1818 to 1945. It was located on the southeastern coast of the Curonian Lagoon and had the town of Labiau as its capital.

== History ==
Districts of East Prussia in 1910

Since the East Prussian district reform of 1752, the largest part of the area of the future Labiau district belonged to the Tapiau district, which included Labiau, Tapiau and Taplacken. As part of the Prussian administrative reforms, the “Ordinance for Improved Establishment of the Provincial Authorities” of 30 April 1815 resulted in the need for a comprehensive district reform in all of East Prussia, as the districts established in 1752 had proven to be inexpedient and too large. On 1 February 1818 the new district of Labiau was formed from the northern part of the Tapiau district in the Königsberg Region of the Prussian province of East Prussia.

Since 1871, the district belonged to the German Reich. In the spring of 1945, the district was occupied by the Red Army and then came under Soviet administration.

In October 1948, Germans were expelled. According to reports, Germans were gven 20 minutes to pack all their belongings and leave their homes.

Today this territory belongs to the Kaliningrad Oblast in Russia.

== Demographics ==
According to the Prussian census of 1867, the Labiau district had a population of 50,467, of which 39,225 (77.7%) were Germans and 11,242 (22.3%) were Lithuanians.
