= East Prussia =

Province of Prussia (1772–1829, 1878–1945)

Coordinates: 54.71°N 20.51°E

East Prussia Ostpreußen (German)
- Province of Prussia
- 1772–1829; 1878–1945
- Flag Coat of arms

- East Prussia (red), within the Kingdom of Prussia (blue), within the German Empire, between 1871 and 1918
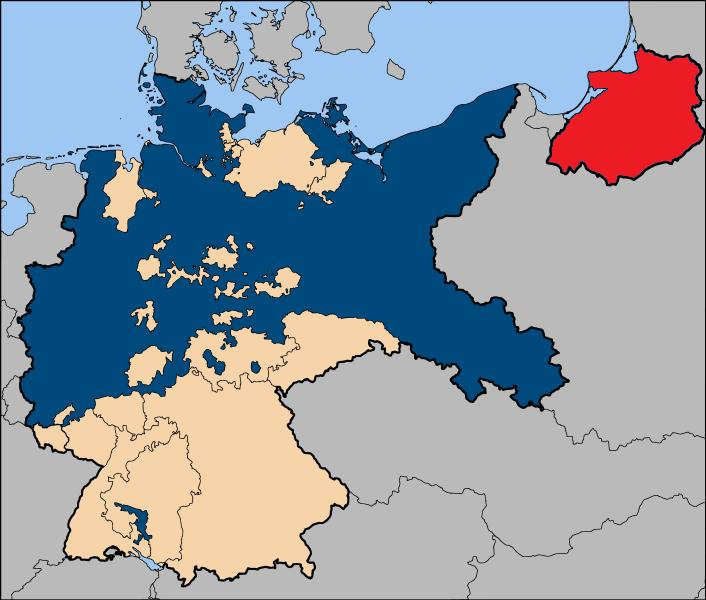
- East Prussia (red) was separated from the rest of the Free State of Prussia (blue) by the Polish corridor and the Free City of Danzig between 1919 and 1939

Anthem
- Ostpreußenlied "Song of East Prussia" (1930–1945)
- Capital: Königsberg
- Demonym: East Prussian
- Area
  - 1905: 36,993 km^{2} (14,283 sq mi)
- Population
  - 1905: 2,030,174
- History
  - Established: 31 January 1772
  - Province of Prussia: 3 December 1829
  - Province restored: 1 April 1878
  - Disestablished: 1 August 1945
- Political subdivisions: Gumbinnen; Königsberg; Allenstein (from 1905); West Prussia (1922–1939); Zichenau (from 1939)
Preceded by
Duchy of Prussia
Province of Prussia
Succeeded by
Klaipėda Region
Marienwerder (region)
Second Polish Republic
Provisional Government of National Unity
Soviet Union
- Today part of: Poland; Lithuania; Russia (Kaliningrad Oblast)

East Prussia (German: Ostpreußen [ˈɔstˌpʁɔɪ̯sn̩]) (Note: Low Prussian: Ostpreißen; Polish: Prusy Wschodnie; Lithuanian: Rytų Prūsija) was a province of the Kingdom of Prussia from 1772 to 1829 and again from 1878, with the Kingdom itself being part of the German Empire from 1871; following World War I, it formed part of the Weimar Republic's Free State of Prussia until 1945. Its capital city was Königsberg (present-day Kaliningrad). The province lay along the south-eastern coast of the Baltic Sea, in territory now belonging to Poland, Russia and Lithuania. Most inhabitants spoke German, although Polish and Lithuanian were also spoken, particularly in Masuria, parts of Ermland (Warmia) and Lithuania Minor.

Much of the region was inhabited by the Old Prussians, a Baltic-speaking people, before its conquest by the Teutonic Order in the 13th century. Under the Order, it formed part of the monastic state, and settlement by Germans expanded. In 1525, the bulk of the territory became the Duchy of Prussia, a vassal of Poland. It gained full sovereignty in 1657 when Poland renounced its feudal rights. Following the annexation of most of Royal Prussia from the Polish–Lithuanian Commonwealth in 1772, the former Duchy of Prussia and the newly acquired Warmia were reorganised as the Province of East Prussia in 1773. From 1829 to 1878, East Prussia and West Prussia were united as the Province of Prussia.

The Treaty of Versailles following World War I granted most of West Prussia to Poland and made East Prussia an exclave of Weimar Germany separated from it by the Polish Corridor. The Memel Territory was annexed by Lithuania in 1923. Following Nazi Germany's defeat in World War II in 1945, East Prussia was divided between the Soviet Union and Poland. The capital city Königsberg was renamed Kaliningrad in 1946. The German, Masurian, and Prussian Lithuanian population of the province was largely evacuated during the war or expelled shortly afterwards. An estimated 300,000 died either in wartime bombing raids, in the battles to defend the province, through mistreatment by the Red Army, or from hunger, cold and disease.

== Geography ==
Physical map of East Prussia in 1905

The landscape of East Prussia consisted of gently rolling plains and small hills, with flatter terrain in the north and more hills in the south. The province had a humid continental climate which was most pronounced in Lithuania Minor and at higher elevations in the south in the region of Masuria, while the northwesternmost coastal parts approached an oceanic climate.

In the northwest, the province bordered the Baltic Sea, with the Vistula Spit and Curonian Spit separating the sea itself from the Vistula Lagoon and Curonian Lagoon, respectively. The Sambia Peninsula (German: Samland) juts into the Baltic Sea between these two lagoons. Most of the rivers of East Prussia emptied into the two lagoons; the Pregel (Russian: Pregolya), Passarge (Polish: Pasłęka), and Frisching (Russian: Prokhladnaya) into the Vistula Lagoon, and the Memel (Russian: Neman, Lithuanian: Nemunas) and Minge (Lithuanian: Minija) into the Curonian Lagoon.

In the northeast of the province, the river Scheschuppe (Lithuanian: Šešupė), a left-tributary of the Memel, formed the border with the Russian Empire, and today forms the border between Kaliningrad Oblast and Lithuania. The Klaipėda Region (German: Memelland) was formed from the portion of the province located north of the Memel river. Adjacent to the Curonian Lagoon and the lower reaches of the Memel river could be found the Elchniederung, a vast partially-drained bog, much of it below sea-level.

Further south, the region becomes more hilly, with fewer bogs and more lakes. To the east, near the modern Polish-Russian border, is the Romincka Forest (German: Rominter Heide), a former hunting-ground for Prussian nobility. On the eastern end of the forest is Lake Vištytis (German: Wystitersee), and to the south are the Szeskie Hills (German: Seesker Höhen). The Angrapa river (German: Angerapp), a tributary of the Pregel, flows out Lake Mamry (German: Mauersee) on the northern end of the Masurian Lake District. The largest lake in the province was Spirdingsee (Polish: Śniardwy), at 113.8 square kilometers in area.

The headwaters of the Pregel's numerous tributaries were found in southern East Prussia, with the longest, the Alle (Polish: Łyna), extending almost to the southern border with Congress Poland, winding its course northward through southern Warmia (German: Ermland) and the central portion of the province. In the southernmost regions, the rivers flow to the south, emptying into the Narew and Vistula rivers. The highest elevation of East Prussia at 312 meters above sea level was Kernsdorfer Höhe (Polish: Dylewska Góra), found in the southwest near the border with West Prussia.

== Background ==
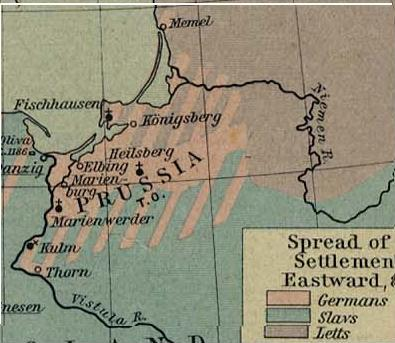
Ethnic settlement in East Prussia by the 14th century

=== Medieval Prussia under the Teutonic Order ===
At the instigation of Duke Konrad I of Masovia, the Teutonic Knights took possession of Prussia in the 13th century and created a monastic state to administer the conquered Old Prussians. Local Old-Prussian (north) and Polish (south) toponyms were gradually Germanised.

The Knights' expansionist policies, including occupation of Polish Pomerania with Gdańsk/Danzig and western Lithuania, brought them into conflict with the Kingdom of Poland and embroiled them in several wars, culminating in the Polish-Lithuanian-Teutonic War, whereby the united armies of Poland and Lithuania, defeated the Teutonic Order at the Battle of Grunwald in 1410.

In 1440, the anti-Teutonic Prussian Confederation was founded, and various cities and nobles of the region joined it. In 1454, upon the Confederation's request King Casimir IV of Poland signed the act of incorporation of the entire region into the Kingdom of Poland.

The Teutonic Knights' defeat was formalised in the Second Peace of Thorn in 1466 ending the Thirteen Years' War. The restoration of Pomerelia to Poland was confirmed, and Warmia also was confirmed part of Poland, with both co-forming the newly created autonomous province of Royal Prussia (from 1569 within the larger Greater Poland Province).

According to the peace treaty the Teutonic Knights regained authority over the remainder of historic Prussia (the bulk of the territory that later formed East Prussia) as a fief of the Polish Crown. 1466 and 1525 arrangements by kings of Poland were not verified by the Holy Roman Empire, as well as the previous gains of the Teutonic Knights, were not verified.

=== Early modern transformation ===
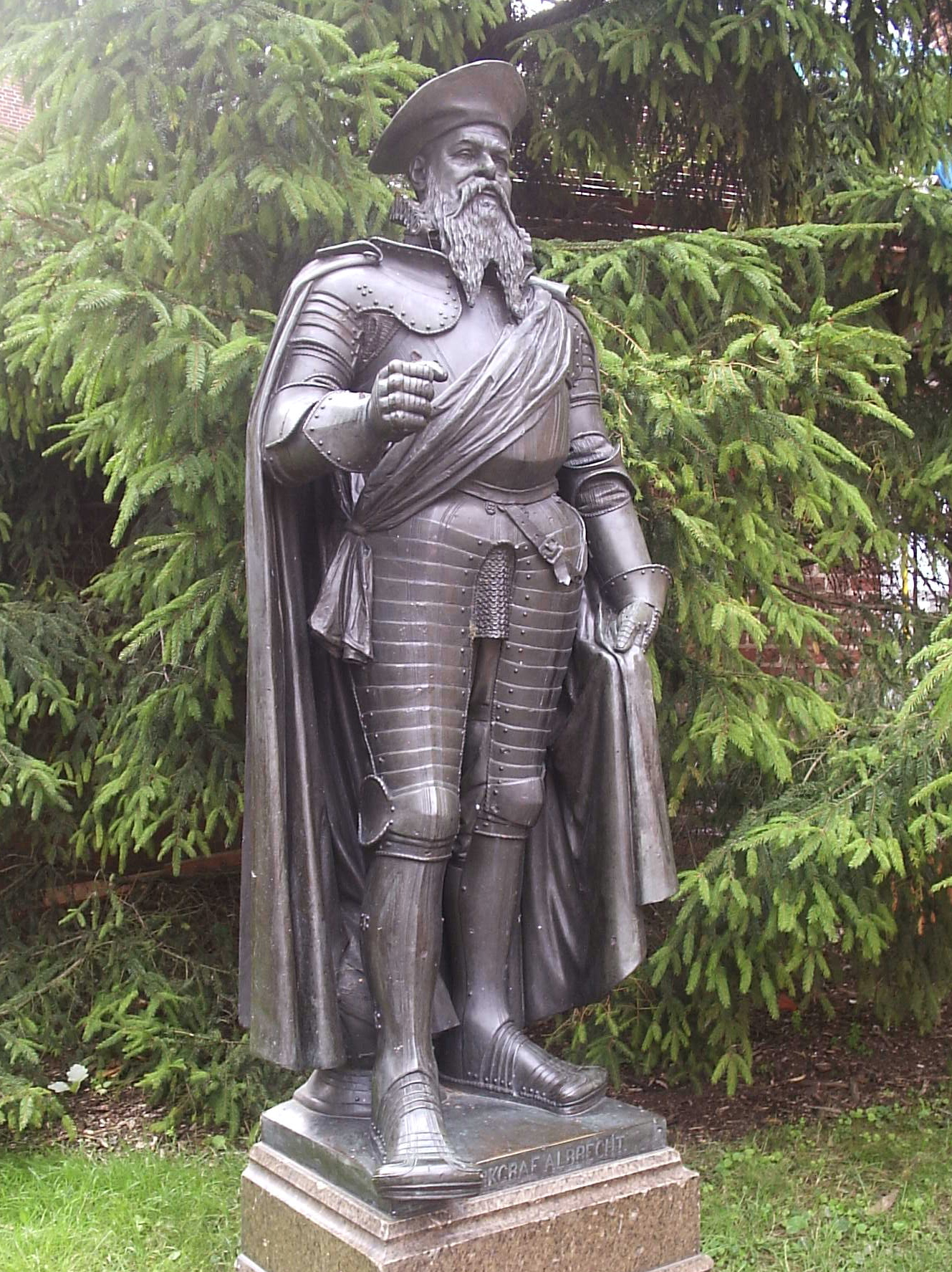
Statue of Albert of Brandenburg-Ansbach (last Grand Master of the Teutonic Order, first Duke of Prussia) in Malbork Castle

The Teutonic Order lost eastern Prussia when Grand Master Albert of Brandenburg-Ansbach converted to Lutheranism and secularized the Prussian branch of the Teutonic Order in 1525. Albert established himself as the first duke of the Duchy of Prussia and a vassal of the Polish crown by the Prussian Homage.

Walter von Cronberg, the next Grand Master, was enfeoffed with the title to Prussia after the Diet of Augsburg in 1530, but the Order never regained possession of the territory. In 1569 the Hohenzollern prince-electors of the Margraviate of Brandenburg became co-regents with Albert's son, the feeble-minded Albert Frederick.

The Administrator of Prussia, the grandmaster of the Teutonic Order Maximilian III, son of emperor Maximilian II died in 1618. When Maximilian died, Albert's line died out, and the Duchy of Prussia passed to the Electors of Brandenburg, forming Brandenburg–Prussia.

=== Prussia between Poland and Brandenburg ===
Taking advantage of the Swedish invasion of Poland in 1655, and instead of fulfilling his vassal's duties towards the Polish Kingdom, by joining forces with the Swedes and subsequent treaties of Wehlau, Labiau, and Oliva, Elector and Duke Frederick William succeeded in revoking the king of Poland's sovereignty over the Duchy of Prussia in 1660.

There was strong opposition to the separation of the region from Poland, especially in Königsberg (Polish: Królewiec). A confederation was formed in the city to maintain Poland's sovereignty over the city and region. The Brandenburg Elector and his army, however, entered the city and abducted and imprisoned the leader of the city's anti-Elector opposition Hieronymus Roth.

In 1663, the city burghers, forced by Elector Frederick William, swore an oath of allegiance to him, however, in the same ceremony they still also pledged allegiance to Poland. The absolutist elector also subdued the noble estates of Prussia.

=== The Kingdom of Prussia ===
Although Brandenburg was a part of the Holy Roman Empire, the Prussian lands were not within the Holy Roman Empire and were with the administration by the Teutonic Order grandmasters under jurisdiction of the Emperor. In return for supporting Emperor Leopold I in the War of the Spanish Succession, Elector Frederick III was allowed to crown himself "King in Prussia" in 1701.

The new kingdom ruled by the Hohenzollern dynasty became known as the Kingdom of Prussia. The designation "Kingdom of Prussia" was gradually applied to the various lands of Brandenburg-Prussia. To differentiate it from the larger entity, the former Duchy of Prussia became known as Altpreußen ("Old Prussia"), the province of Prussia, or "East Prussia".

Approximately one-third of East Prussia's population died in the Great Northern War plague outbreak and famine of 1709–1711, including the last speakers of Old Prussian. The plague, probably brought by foreign troops during the Great Northern War, killed 250,000 East Prussians, especially in the province's eastern regions.

Crown Prince Frederick William I led the rebuilding of East Prussia, founding numerous towns. In 1724, Frederick William I prohibited Poles, Samogitians and Jews from settling in Lithuania Minor, and initiated German colonization to change the region's ethnic composition. Thousands of Protestants expelled from the Archbishopric of Salzburg were allowed to settle in depleted East Prussia.

In 1756, Russia decided to go to war with the Kingdom of Prussia and annex the territory, which was then to be offered to Poland as part of a territorial exchange desired by Russia, however, ultimately Russia only occupied the region for four years during the Seven Years' War before withdrawing in 1762 and did not make Poland an offer of territorial exchange.

== History as a province ==
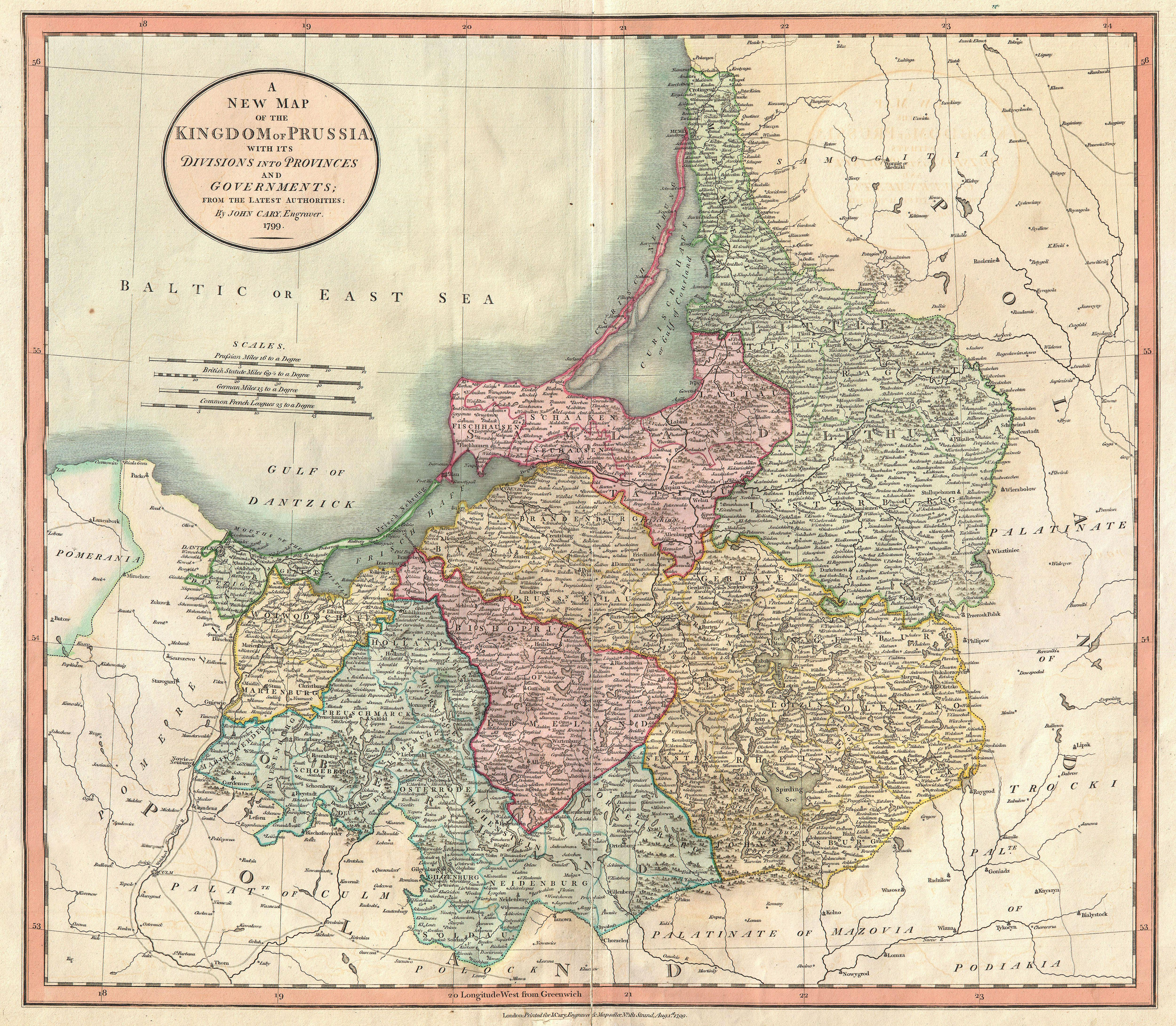
New Map of the Kingdom of Prussia published by John Cary in 1799. The map shows the eastern regions of Lithuania Minor, Natangia, Sambia and Warmia, along with the western Oberland territories including Marienwerder and the area surrounding Marienburg.

In the 1772 First Partition of Poland, King Frederick the Great annexed neighbouring Royal Prussia – the Polish voivodeships (provinces) of Pomerania (Pomerelia), Malbork, Chełmno and the Prince-Bishopric of Warmia. This connected his Prussian and Farther Pomeranian lands and cut the remainder of Poland off from the Baltic coast. The Polish Partition Sejm ratified the cession on 22 September 1772, after which Frederick styled himself King "of" Prussia rather than "in" Prussia. The territory of Warmia was incorporated into the former Ducal Prussia, which was designated "East Prussia" by administrative decree of 31 January 1773. The former Polish Pomerelian lands beyond the Vistula together with Marienburg and the Culmer Land formed the Province of West Prussia with its capital at Marienwerder.

Several former Ducal Prussian districts – Eylau (now Iława), Marienwerder, Riesenburg (now Prabuty) and Schönberg (now Szymbark) – were also transferred to West Prussia. Until the Prussian reforms of 1808, the government of East Prussia was administered through the General War and Finance Directorate in Berlin, represented locally by two chamber departments:

- German Chamber Department at Königsberg, overseeing the districts of:
  - Braunsberg
  - Brandenburg (Ushakovo)
  - Heilsberg
  - Mohrungen
  - Neidenburg
  - Rastenburg
  - Samland
  - Tapiau
- Lithuanian Chamber Department at Gumbinnen (now Gusev), overseeing the districts of:
  - Gumbinnen (Gusev)
  - Olecko
  - Insterburg
  - Memel
  - Ragnit
  - Seehesten (Sensburg)
  - Tilsit

These administrative reorganizations shaped the political and economic structure of the Prussian state, integrating Polish, Baltic and German territories under a unified system that laid the foundation for later nineteenth-century reforms. They also set the stage for the significant restructuring that followed the post-1808 Prussian reform era.

=== Napoleonic Wars ===
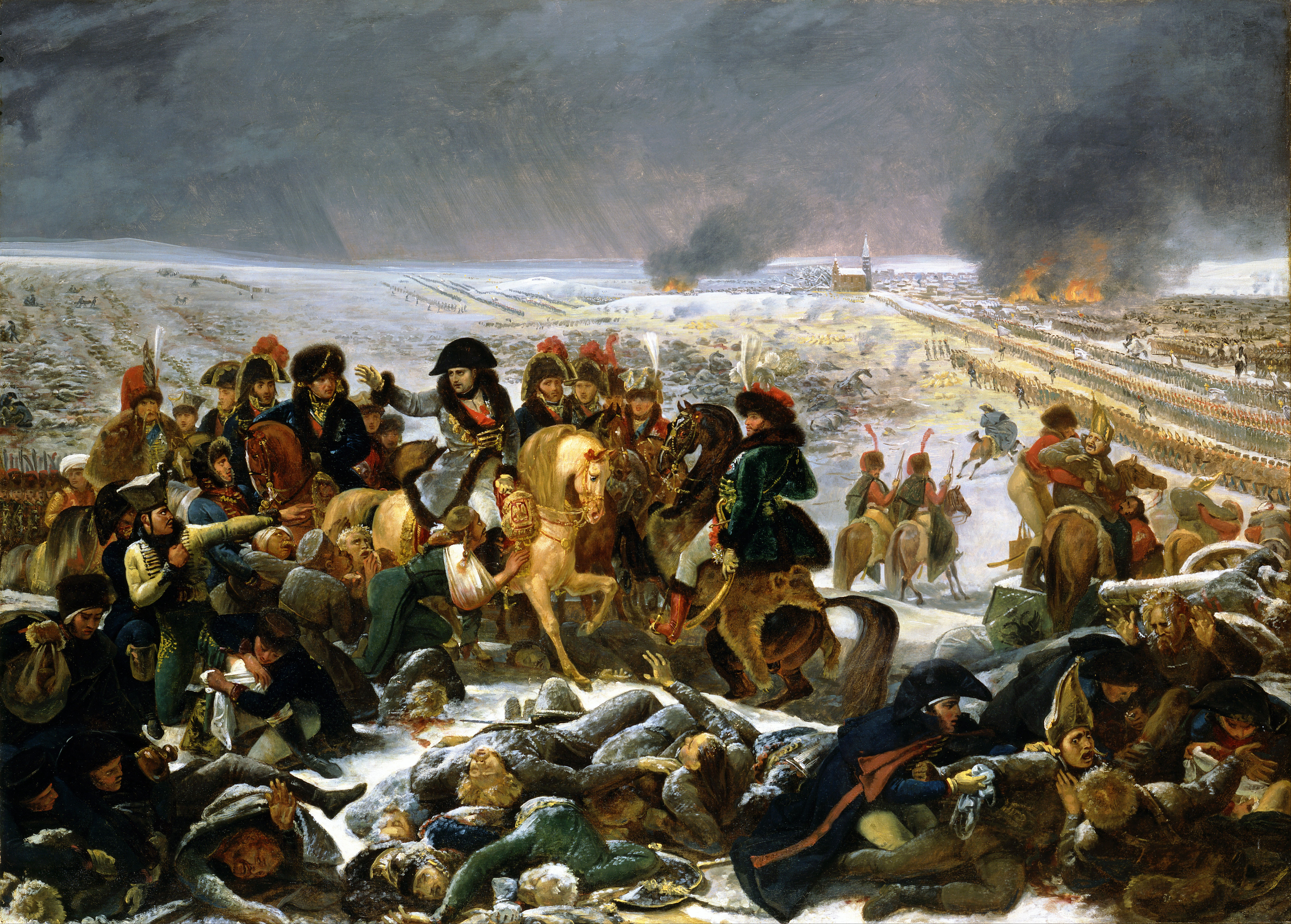
Napoleon on the Battlefield of Eylau in February 1807

After the disastrous defeat of the Royal Prussian Army at the Battle of Jena–Auerstedt in 1806, Napoleon occupied Berlin and had the officials of the Prussian General Directorate swear an oath of allegiance to him. King Frederick William III and Queen Louise fled to Memel ahead of Napoleon. The French Grande Armée immediately took up pursuit but were delayed in the Battle of Eylau on 9 February 1807 by an East Prussian contingent under General Anton Wilhelm von L'Estocq. In May, after a siege of 78 days, Napoleon's troops led by Marshal François Joseph Lefebvre were able to capture the city of Danzig, which had been tenaciously defended by General Count Friedrich Adolf von Kalkreuth. On 14 June, Napoleon ended the War of the Fourth Coalition with his victory over Russia at the Battle of Friedland. Frederick William and Queen Louise met with Napoleon for peace negotiations, and on 9 July the Prussian king signed the Treaty of Tilsit, under which Prussia lost almost half of its territory.

The succeeding Prussian reforms instigated by Heinrich Friedrich Karl vom und zum Stein and Karl August von Hardenberg included the implementation of an appellate court at Königsberg and emancipation of the serfs and Jews throughout Prussia.

Shortly after the conclusion of the Congress of Vienna (1814–1815), which restored and expanded the Kingdom of Prussia, East Prussia was divided into the new or renamed administrative districts (Regierungsbezirke) Gumbinnen and Königsberg. In 1905, the southern districts of East Prussia became the separate Regierungsbezirk of Allenstein. East and West Prussia were united in personal union under Oberpräsident Theodor von Schön in 1824 and then merged in a real union in 1829 to form the Province of Prussia. The united province was split back into separate East and West Prussian provinces in 1878.

=== German Empire ===
Population of East Prussia
Year	Population
1820	1,032,240
1850	1,485,806
1900	1,996,626
1925	2,256,349
1933	2,333,301
1939	2,488,122

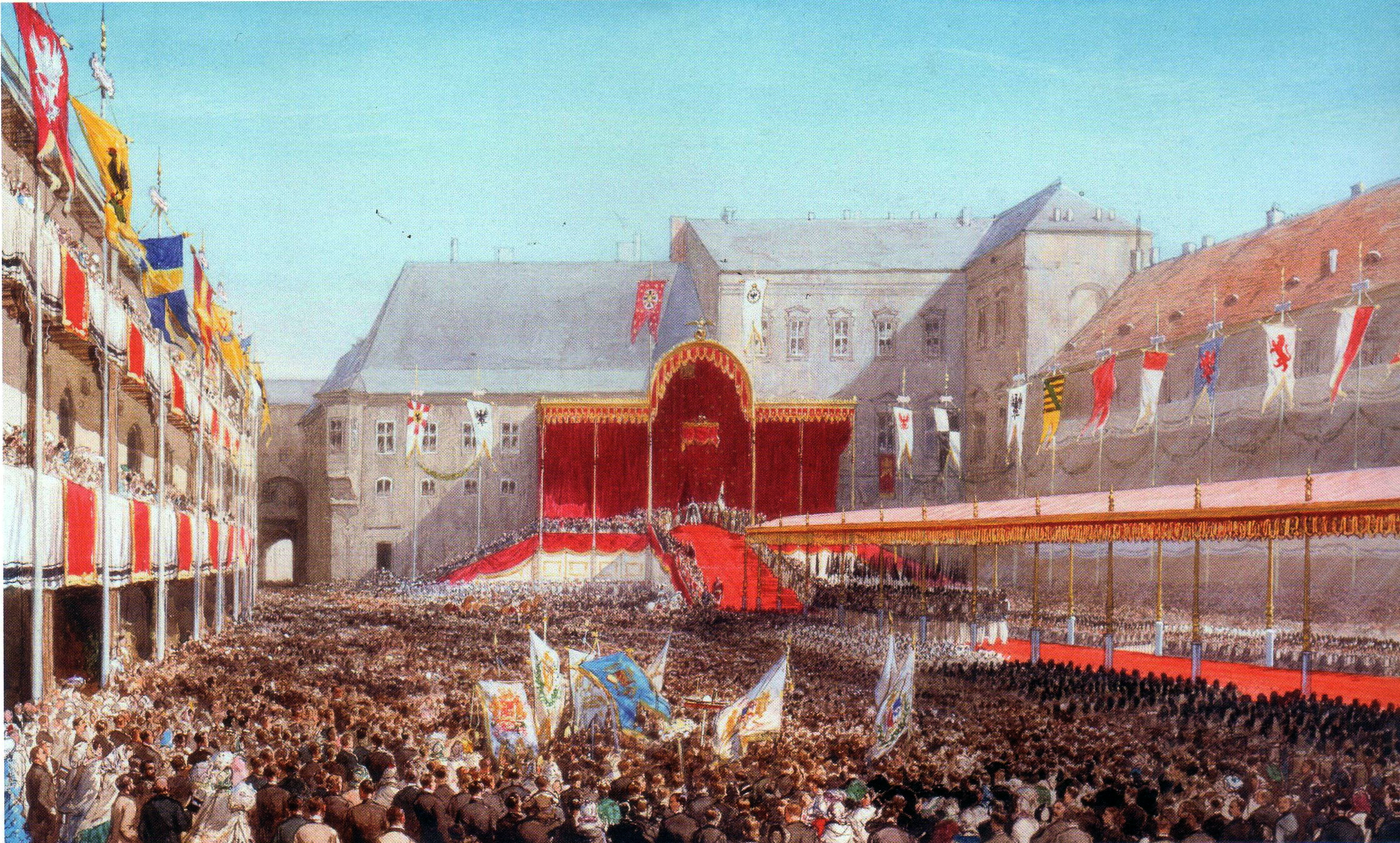
Coronation of William I as King of Prussia at Königsberg Castle in 1861

Along with the rest of the Kingdom of Prussia, East Prussia (then still joined with West Prussia in the united Province of Prussia) became part of the German Empire with the unification of Germany in 1871.

Some 920,000 East Prussians left the province between 1871 and 1933 to look for work elsewhere. The majority went to the industrially expanding Ruhr region; others went overseas to North and South America. In spite of the emigration, East Prussia's population continued to increase, although less rapidly than in the industrialising areas.

In 1900, 85.1% of the population was Protestant, 13.4% Roman Catholic, 0.8% other Christian denominations and 0.7% Jewish.

=== World War I ===
At the German entry into World War I, East Prussia became a theatre of war when the Russian Empire invaded the province. The Imperial Russian Army at first encountered little resistance because the bulk of the Imperial German Army had been directed towards the Western Front under the Schlieffen Plan. Despite early success and the capture of the towns of Rastenburg and Gumbinnen, the Russians were decisively defeated and forced to retreat in the Battle of Tannenberg in 1914 and the Second Battle of the Masurian Lakes in 1915. The German Army followed the Russians and advanced into Russian territory.

After the Russian army's first invasion, the majority of the civilian population in the affected region fled westwards, while several thousand remaining civilians were deported to Russia. Treatment of civilians by both armies was mostly disciplined, although 61 civilians were killed by Russian troops in the Abschwangen massacre on 29 August 1914. The region had to be rebuilt because of damage caused by the war.

=== Weimar Republic ===
==== German revolution ====
In the final days of World War I, the German revolution led to the abdications of all of Germany's monarchs, including Emperor and King of Prussia Wilhelm II. In East Prussia, the revolution played out with relatively little violence. On 9 November 1918, the day a republic was proclaimed in Berlin, about 1,000 revolutionary soldiers freed political prisoners in Königsberg and occupied the city's military command centres, police headquarters, train station and telegraph offices. They then set up a soviet-style workers' and soldiers' council on the model of those that had been established across Germany following the outbreak of the revolution in Kiel. In the following weeks, similar councils were set up in East Prussia's garrison towns, and peasants' councils were established in rural areas. Throughout the province, the majority of the imperial authorities and administrative machinery were left in place, with the councils acting as supervisory bodies over them. Their key concerns initially were to provide for the provisioning of food, maintain public order and prepare for national, state and local elections.

The Königsberg workers' and soldiers' council found it difficult to enforce its orders both in the city and across the rest of East Prussia, and economic activity all but came to a halt. The Spartacist People's Navy Division was the greatest cause of concern. August Winnig, who was named East Prussia's Reich and State Commissioner with dictatorial powers on 22 January 1919, wrote later that "real power lay with a horde of deserting marines who had arrived in Königsberg in the first days of the revolution and had swelled in number to one and a half thousand men. At their head stood a committee of seven [. . . ] Relying on this force, the committee of seven ruled the city, and since it had generally subjugated the soldiers' councils, it was also master of the province.” There was widespread fear that Russian Bolsheviks might take advantage of the disorder to occupy East Prussia. On 24 February 1919, a Königsberg People's Defence Regiment was formed, and on 3–4 March it regained control of Königsberg from the Spartacists after heavy street fighting that left 22 dead and 53 wounded.

Despite the difficult situation in the province, elections for the Weimar National Assembly, the Prussian Landtag and the Königsberg city council were held without disruptions beginning in January 1919. As in the elections to the councils, all women and men who were at least 20 years old were allowed to vote under a system of equal suffrage. The new voting law replaced the Prussian three-class franchise which had weighted votes based on the amount of taxes the voters paid. In the election to the Prussian Landtag, the moderate socialist Majority Social Democrats won the most votes from East Prussia; in the Königsberg city council race, it was the more leftist Independent Social Democrats that took the largest number of seats.

==== Treaty of Versailles and territorial losses ====
Inter-war East Prussia (from 1923 to 1939)

Under the Treaty of Versailles, the terms of which were announced on 7 May 1919, East Prussia lost 10% of its former land area and 9% of its population. The Działdowo district in the Allenstein region was ceded to the Second Polish Republic and the Memel Territory to the Allied Powers before it became part of Lithuania. The former West Prussian regions of Marienburg, Marienwerder, Elbing and several others became part of East Prussia as the administrative district of West Prussia (population 260,000). As a result of the territorial changes, East Prussia became an exclave, separated from the rest of Germany by the Polish Corridor. The Seedienst Ostpreußen (Sea Service East Prussia) was established to provide transport service to East Prussia that did not pass through Polish territory.

The Memelland (today the Klaipėda Region of Lithuania), which was 43.5% German-speaking in 1925, became a League of Nations mandate in 1920. It was occupied by the Lithuanian Armed Forces in 1923 and annexed without giving the inhabitants a voice through a referendum.

Division of East Prussian territory between Germany, Lithuania and Poland after World War I
After Treaty of Versailles part of:	Area in 1910 in km^{2}	Share of territory	Population in 1910
Germany (East Prussia)	33,609 km^{2}	90%	1,878,400
Poland (Pomeranian Voivodeship) (Note: The territory gained included part of pre-1918 county Neidenburg (Nidzica) with Soldau (Działdowo) and around 27,000 inhabitants plus parts of county Osterode (Ostróda) near Gilgenburg (Dąbrówno), with areas around Groschken (Groszki), Klein Lobenstein (Lubstynek), Gut Nappern (Napromek), Klein Nappern (Czerlin), Gross Lehwalde (Lewałd Wielki), Gross Grieben (Grzybiny) and around 4,786 inhabitants. Since it was too small to form its own voivodeship, the territory was incorporated into the interwar Pomeranian Voivodeship.)	565 km^{2}	2%	41,300
Lithuania (Klaipėda Region)	2,828 km^{2}	8%	144,500
	37,002 km^{2}	100%	2,064,200

Mass demonstrations supported by all political parties except the leftist Independent Social Democrats were held following the announcement of the treaty's terms. East Prussians feared becoming a German "colony", losing their cultural identity and the possibility of being occupied by their Slavic neighbours. In July 1920, German President Friedrich Ebert, out of concern that the ongoing Polish–Soviet War could spill over into the province, declared a state of emergency in East Prussia, and local border patrols were readied to stop both foreign soldiers and refugees from crossing into East Prussia. The region consequently became a more central part of German political interests than it had been in the past.

In accordance with Articles 94 to 97 of the Treaty of Versailles, a plebiscite took place in the mixed German-Polish regions of the southern Allenstein administrative district of East Prussia and also in parts of eastern West Prussia. The East Prussian plebiscite, held on 11 July 1920, asked the regions' inhabitants if the areas should remain in Germany or become part of Poland. Of the voters in the East Prussian part of the plebiscite district, 97.8% opted to stay in Germany, as did 92.4% in the West Prussian district.

In the 1925 and 1929, East Prussian provincial elections, the two strongest parties were the anti-republican German National People's Party and the Majority Social Democrats. The young Nazi Party polled only 4% in the two elections. The final election in 1933 took place after the Nazi seizure of power and gave 58% of the votes to the Nazis.

=== Nazi Germany ===
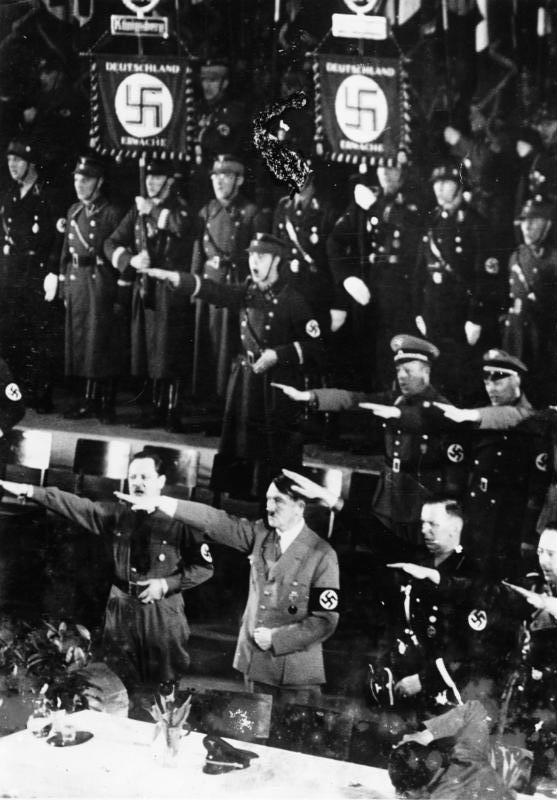
Adolf Hitler and Erich Koch in Königsberg, 1936

After Adolf Hitler's rise to power, opposition politicians were persecuted and newspapers banned. Erich Koch, who headed the East Prussian Nazi party from 1928, led the district from 1932. The Otto-Braun-House was requisitioned to become the headquarters of the SA, which used the house to imprison and torture its opponents. Walter Schütz, a communist member of the Reichstag, was murdered here. This period was characterized by efforts to collectivize the local agriculture and ruthlessness in dealing with Koch's critics inside and outside the Nazi Party. He also had long-term plans for mass-scale industrialization of the largely agricultural province. These actions made him unpopular among the local peasants. In 1932, the local paramilitary SA had already started to terrorise their political opponents. On the night of 31 July 1932, there was a bomb attack on the headquarters of the Social Democrats in Königsberg, the Otto-Braun-House. The Communist politician Gustav Sauf was killed; the executive editor of the Social Democratic newspaper "Königsberger Volkszeitung", Otto Wyrgatsch; and the German People's Party politician Max von Bahrfeldt were all severely injured. Members of the Reichsbanner were assaulted while the local Reichsbanner Chairman of Lötzen, Kurt Kotzan, was murdered on 6 August 1932.

In the March 1933 German federal election, the last contested pre-war German election, the local population of East Prussia voted overwhelmingly for Adolf Hitler's Nazi Party.

Through publicly funded emergency relief programs concentrating on agricultural land-improvement projects and road construction, the "Erich Koch Plan" for East Prussia allegedly made the province free of unemployment: on 16 August 1933 Koch reported to Hitler that unemployment had been banished entirely from the province, a feat that gained admiration throughout the Reich. In actuality, the Erich Koch Plan had been a staged propaganda event organized by Walther Funk and the Reich Ministry of Public Enlightenment and Propaganda to promote the Nazi Party's work creation policies, with East Prussia chosen because it already had relatively low unemployment due to its agrarian economy. Koch's industrialization plans provoked conflict with Richard Walther Darré, who held the office of the Reich Peasant Leader (Reichsbauernführer) and Minister of Agriculture. Darré, a neopaganist rural romantic, wanted to enforce his vision of an agricultural East Prussia. When his "Land" representatives challenged Koch's plans, Koch arrested them.

In 1938, the Nazis changed about one-third of the toponyms of the area, eliminating, Germanizing, or simplifying a number of Old Prussian, as well as those Polish or Lithuanian names originating from colonists and refugees to Prussia during and after the Protestant Reformation. More than 1,500 places were ordered to be renamed by 16 July 1938 following a decree issued by Gauleiter and Oberpräsident Erich Koch and initiated by Adolf Hitler. Many who would not cooperate with the rulers of Nazi Germany were sent to concentration camps and held prisoner there until their death or liberation.

After the 1939 German ultimatum to Lithuania, the Klaipėda region was integrated again into East Prussia.

=== World War II ===
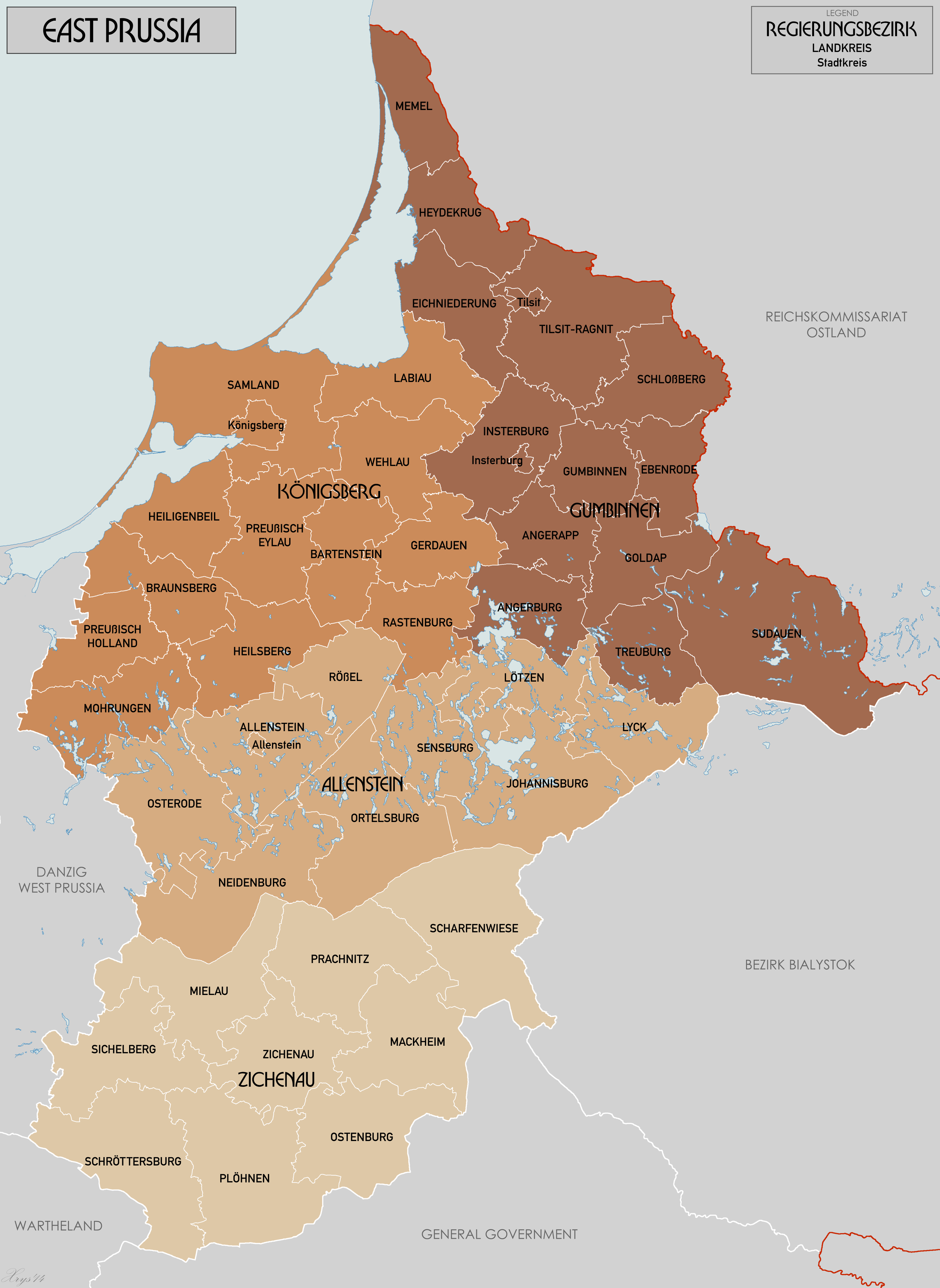
Map of East Prussian Districts in 1945

After the 1939 invasion of Poland by Nazi Germany opening World War II, the borders of East Prussia were revised. Regierungsbezirk Westpreußen became part of Reichsgau Danzig-West Prussia, while Regierungsbezirk Zichenau (Ciechanów) was added to East Prussia. Originally part of the Zichenau region, the Sudauen (Suwałki) district in Sudovia was later transferred to the Gumbinnen region. In 1939, East Prussia had 2.49 million inhabitants, 85% of them ethnic Germans, the other Poles in the south who, according to Polish estimates numbered in the interwar period around 300,000–350,000, the Latvian speaking Kursenieki, and Lietuvininkai who spoke Lithuanian in the northeast. Most German East Prussians, Masurians, Kursieniki, and Lietuvininkai were Lutheran, while the population of Warmia was mainly Roman Catholic due to the history of its bishopric. The East Prussian Jewish Congregation declined from about 9,000 in 1933 to 3,000 in 1939, as most fled from Nazi rule.

During World War II, the Polish ethnic minorities of Catholic Warmians and Lutheran Masurians were persecuted by the Nazi German government, which wanted to erase all aspects of Polish culture and Polish language in Warmia and Masuria. The Jews who remained in East Prussia in 1942 were shipped to concentration camps, including Theresienstadt in occupied Czechoslovakia, Kaiserwald in occupied Latvia, and camps in Minsk in occupied Byelorussian Soviet Socialist Republic. Deportations began 24 June 1942 and continued throughout the war. Most of those deported were killed in the Holocaust.

In 1939, the Regierungsbezirk Zichenau was annexed by Germany and incorporated into East Prussia. Parts of it were transferred to other regions, e.g. Suwałki Region to Regierungsbezirk Gumbinnen and Soldau (Działdowo) to Regierungsbezirk Allenstein.

In the annexed pre-war Polish territory, the Polish population was subjected to various crimes, including mass arrests, roundups, deportations to forced labour and concentration camps (including teenagers), executions, massacres (also as part of the Intelligenzaktion and Aktion T4) and expulsions. The Jews were confined in ghettos and afterwards deported either deported to extermination camps or massacred in the region.

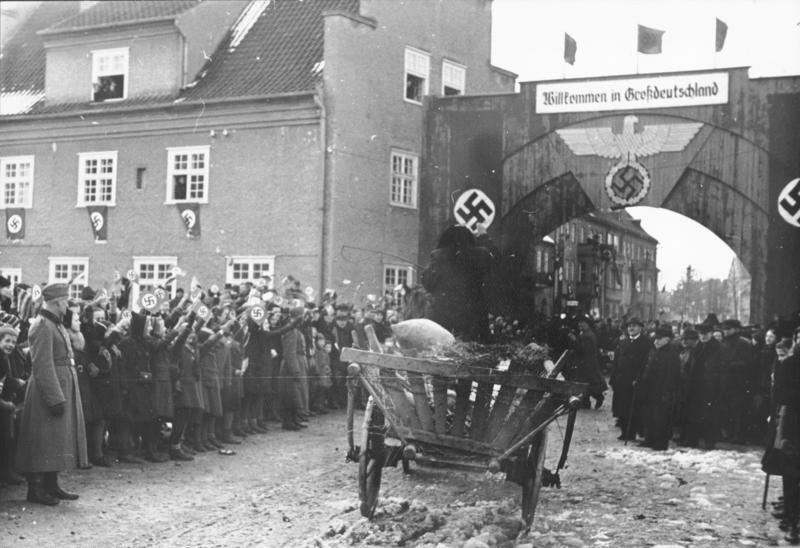
Eydtkau (now Chernyshevskoye) in 1941. Return of the ethnic Germans from Lithuania to the Reich. At the border crossing point near Eydtkau in East Prussia, the first convoys of ethnic Germans from Lithuania arrived, who have now also been brought back to the Reich. Caption: the wagons of the first convoy entering Eydtkau. The population had erected a gate decorated with flags for their reception and welcomed the ethnic Germans with heartfelt joy.

Germany operated the Soldau and Hohenbruch concentration camps, mostly for Poles, multiple subcamps of the Stutthof concentration camp and several prisoner-of-war camps, including Stalag I-A, Stalag I-B, Stalag I-C, Stalag I-D, Stalag I-E, Stalag I-F, Stalag Luft VI, Oflag 52, Oflag 53, Oflag 60, Oflag 63 and Oflag 68 with multiple subcamps, for Polish, Belgian, French, British, Serbian, Soviet, Italian, American, Canadian, Australian, New Zealander, South African, Czech and other Allied POWs in the province. Pre-war Polish citizens made up the majority of forced laborers in the province, with their numbers gradually increasing, but due to the influx of forced laborers of other nationalities, their overall percentage declined from 90% in 1940 to 62% in 1944. Most Polish forced laborers in the province were deported from the pre-war Polish territories annexed into the province by Germany, with German labor offices recruiting forced laborers established in the cities of Ciechanów, Ostrołęka, Płock and Suwałki.

Hitler's top-secret Eastern front headquarters during the war, the Wolf's Lair, was located in the village of Gierłoż.

The Polish resistance was active in the province, both in the annexed pre-war territory of Poland, and in the pre-war territory of East Prussia, with activities in the latter including distribution of Polish underground press, sabotage actions, executions of Nazis, theft of German weapons, ammunition and equipment, and organization of transports of POWs who escaped German POW camps via the ports of Danzig and Gdynia to neutral Sweden.

East Prussia was only slightly affected by the war until January 1945, when it was devastated during the East Prussian Offensive. Most of its inhabitants became refugees in bitterly cold weather during the Evacuation of East Prussia.

==== Evacuation of East Prussia ====
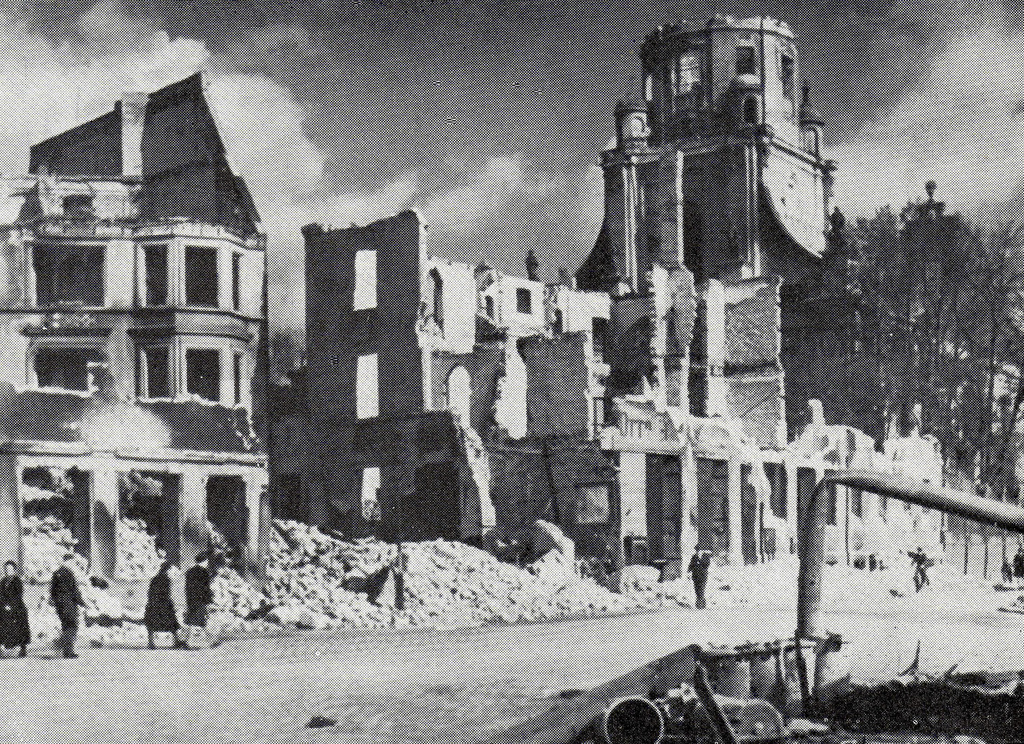
Königsberg after the RAF bombing in 1944

In 1944, the medieval city of Königsberg, which had never been severely damaged by warfare in its 700 years of existence, was almost completely destroyed by two RAF Bomber Command raids – the first on the night of 26/27 August 1944, with the second one three nights later, overnight on 29/30 August 1944. Winston Churchill (The Second World War, Book XII) had erroneously believed it to be "a modernized heavily defended fortress" and ordered its destruction.

Gauleiter Erich Koch delayed the evacuation of the German civilian population until the Eastern Front approached the East Prussian border in 1944. The population had been systematically misinformed by Endsieg Nazi propaganda about the real state of military affairs. As a result, many civilians fleeing westward were overtaken by retreating Wehrmacht units and the rapidly advancing Red Army.

Reports of Soviet atrocities in the Nemmersdorf massacre of October 1944 and organized rape spread fear and desperation among the civilians. Thousands lost their lives during the sinkings (by Soviet submarine) of the evacuation ships Wilhelm Gustloff, the Goya, and the General von Steuben. Königsberg surrendered on 9 April 1945, following the desperate four-day Battle of Königsberg. An estimated 300,000 died either in wartime bombing raids, in the battles to defend the province, or through mistreatment by the Red Army or from hunger, cold and disease.

However, most of the German inhabitants, which then consisted primarily of women, children and old men, did manage to escape the Red Army as part of the largest exodus of people in human history: "A population which had stood at 2.2 million in 1940 was reduced to 193,000 at the end of May 1945."

== History after partition and annexation ==
Following Nazi Germany's defeat in World War II in 1945, East Prussia was partitioned between Poland and the Soviet Union according to the Potsdam Conference, pending a final peace conference with Germany. Since a peace conference never took place, the region was effectively ceded by Germany. Southern East Prussia was placed under Polish administration, while northern East Prussia was divided between the Soviet republics of Russia (the Kaliningrad Oblast) and Lithuania (the constituent counties of the Klaipėda Region). The city of Königsberg was renamed Kaliningrad in 1946. Most of the German population of the province had left during the evacuation at the end of the war, but several hundreds of thousands died during the years 1944–46 and the remainder was subsequently expelled in accordance with the Potsdam Agreement.

=== Expulsion of Germans from East Prussia after World War II ===
Shortly after the end of the war in May 1945, Germans who had fled in early 1945 tried to return to their homes in East Prussia. An estimated number of 800,000 Germans were living in East Prussia during the summer of 1945. Many more were prevented from returning, and the German population of East Prussia was almost completely expelled by the Communist regimes of the Soviet Union and the People's Republic of Poland. During the war and for some time thereafter 45 camps were established for about 200,000–250,000 forced labourers, the vast majority of whom were deported to the interior of the newly proclaimed Kaliningrad Oblast, including the Gulag camp system. The largest camp with about 48,000 inmates was established at Deutsch Eylau (Iława). Orphaned children who were left behind in the zone occupied by the Soviet Union were referred to as Wolf children.

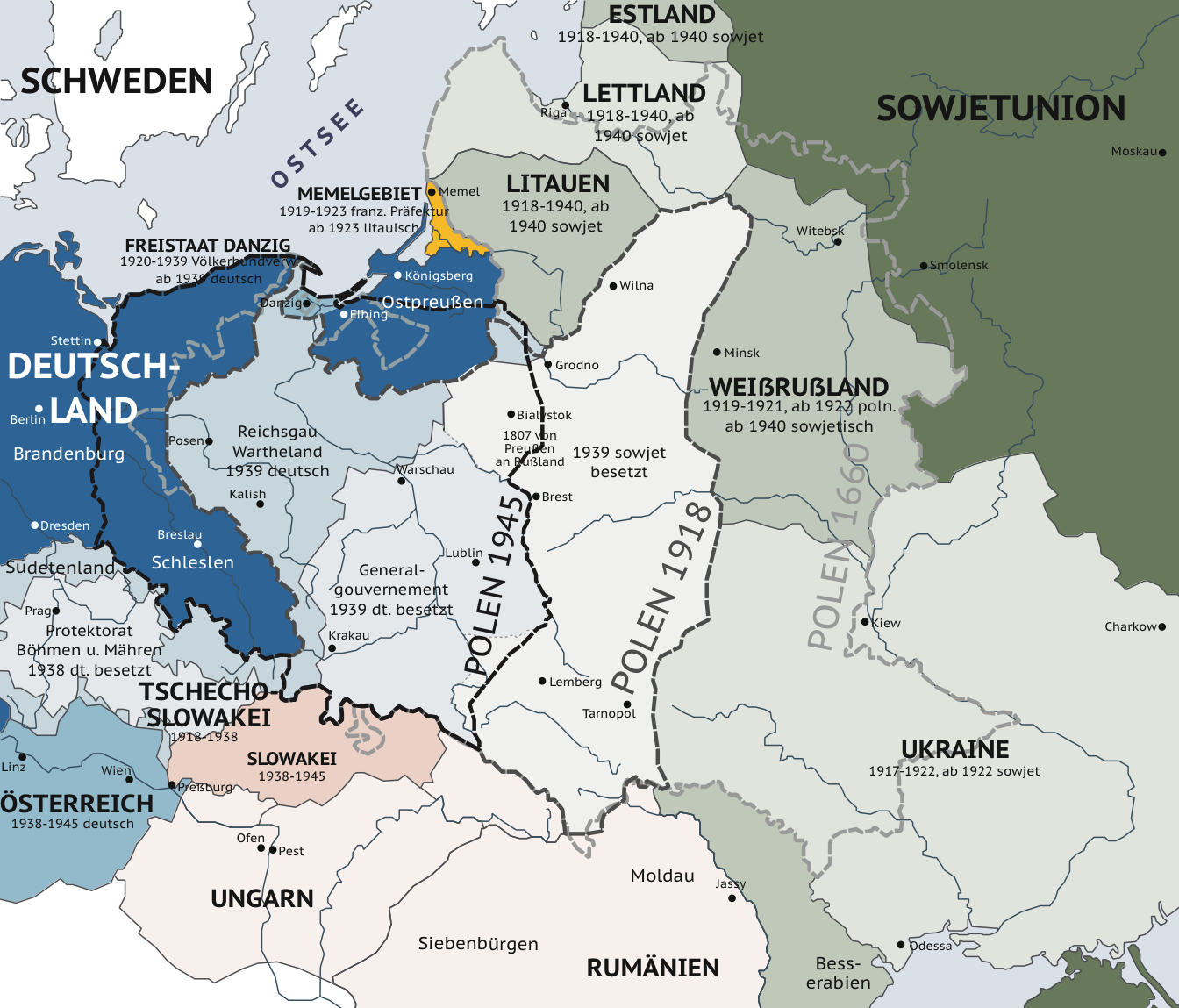
An illustration of the changing borders in Eastern Europe before, during, and after World War II (Map is written in German.)

Changes in Germany's borders as a result of both World Wars, with the partition of East Prussia

=== Southern East Prussia to Poland ===
Representatives of the Polish government officially took over the civilian administration of the southern part of East Prussia on 23 May 1945. Subsequently, Polish expatriates from Polish lands annexed by the Soviet Union as well as Ukrainians and Lemkos from southern Poland, expelled in Operation Vistula, were settled in the area, initially organised as the Masurian District, later replaced by the Olsztyn Voivodeship in 1947, with a few counties incorporated into Białystok Voivodeship and to Gdańsk Voivodeship. The latter counted in 1950 689,000 inhabitants, 22.6% of them coming from areas annexed by the Soviet Union, 10% Ukrainians, and 18.5% of them pre-war inhabitants. It was dissolved in 1975 to form three smaller units: a much smaller homonymous Olsztyn Voivodeship, the bulk of Elbląg Voivodeship and a significant part of the Suwałki Voivodeship.

The remaining pre-war population was treated as Germanized Poles and a policy of re-Polonization was pursued throughout the country Most of these "Autochthons" chose to emigrate to West Germany from the 1950s through 1980s (between 1970 and 1988 55,227 persons from Warmia and Masuria moved to Western Germany). Local toponyms were Polonised by the Polish Commission for the Determination of Place Names, though in most cases it was a restoration of historic Polish names.

==== Origin of the post-war population ====
During the Polish post-war census of December 1950, data about the pre-war places of residence of the inhabitants as of August 1939 was collected. In case of children born between September 1939 and December 1950, their origin was reported based on the pre-war places of residence of their mothers. Thanks to this data it is possible to reconstruct the pre-war geographical origin of the post-war population. The same area corresponding to pre-war southern parts of East Prussia (which became Polish in 1945) was inhabited in December 1950 by:

1950 population by place of residence back in 1939:
Region (within 1939 borders):	Number	Percent
Autochthons (1939 DE/FCD citizens)	134,702	15.90%
Polish expellees from Kresy (USSR)	172,480	20.36%
Poles from abroad except the USSR	5,734	0.68%
Resettlers from the City of Warsaw	22,418	2.65%
From Warsaw region (Masovia)	158,953	18.76%
From Białystok region and Sudovia	102,634	12.11%
From pre-war Polish Pomerania	83,921	9.90%
Resettlers from Poznań region	7,371	0.87%
Katowice region (East Upper Silesia)	2,536	0.30%
Resettlers from the City of Łódź	1,666	0.20%
Resettlers from Łódź region	6,919	0.82%
Resettlers from Kielce region	20,878	2.46%
Resettlers from Lublin region	60,313	7.12%
Resettlers from Kraków region	5,515	0.65%
Resettlers from Rzeszów region	47,626	5.62%
place of residence in 1939 unknown	13,629	1.61%
Total pop. in December 1950	847,295	100.00%

Over 80% of the 1950 inhabitants were new in the region, less than 20% had resided in the province already back in 1939 (so called autochthons, who had German citizenship before World War II and were granted Polish citizenship after 1945). Over 20% of all inhabitants were Poles expelled from areas of Eastern Poland annexed by the USSR. The rest were mostly people from neighbouring areas located right next to East Prussia (almost 44% came from Masovia, Sudovia, Podlachia and pre-war Polish Pomerania) and southern Poland (≈16%).

=== Northern part to the Soviet Union ===
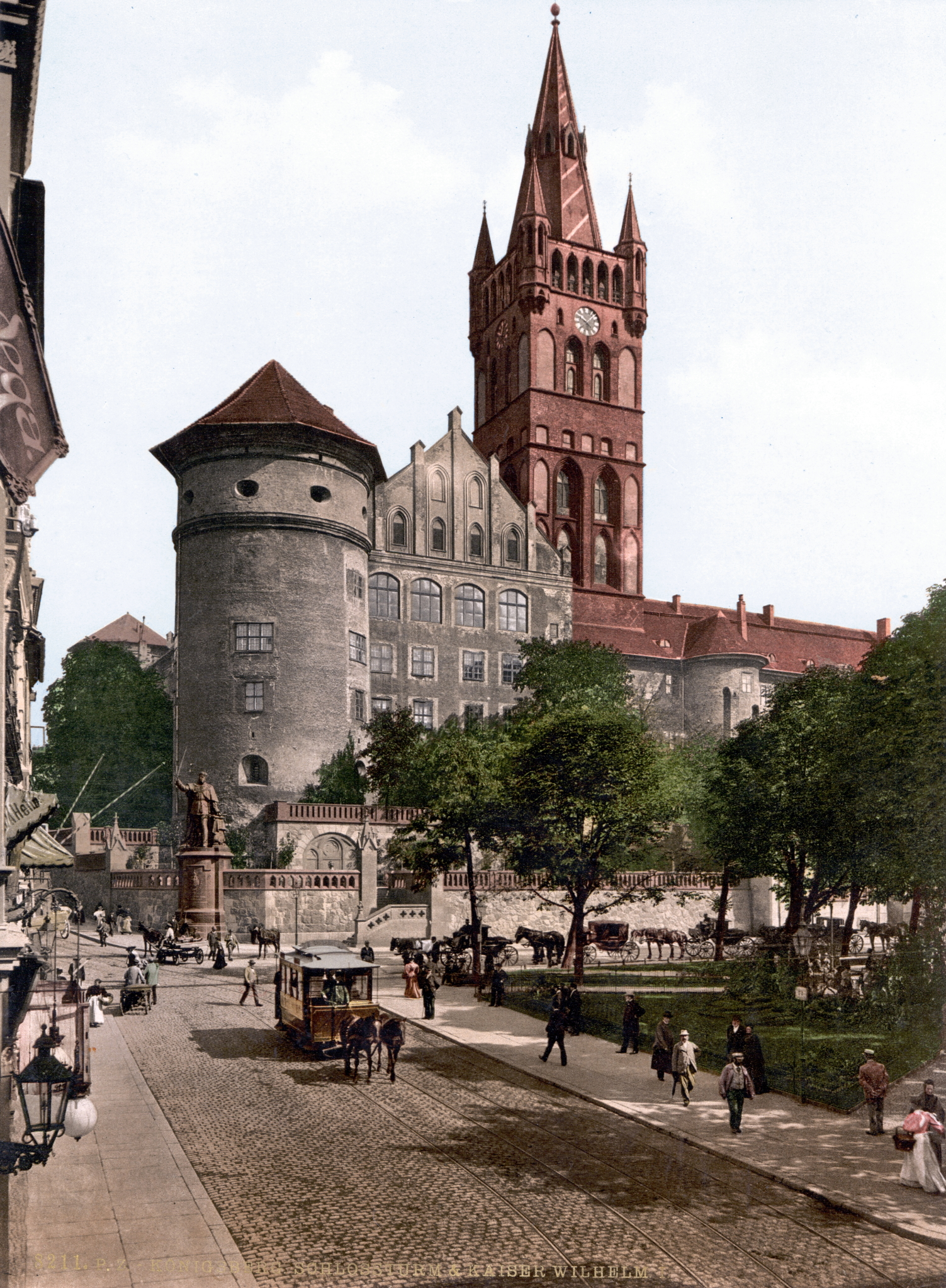
Königsberg Castle, 1895

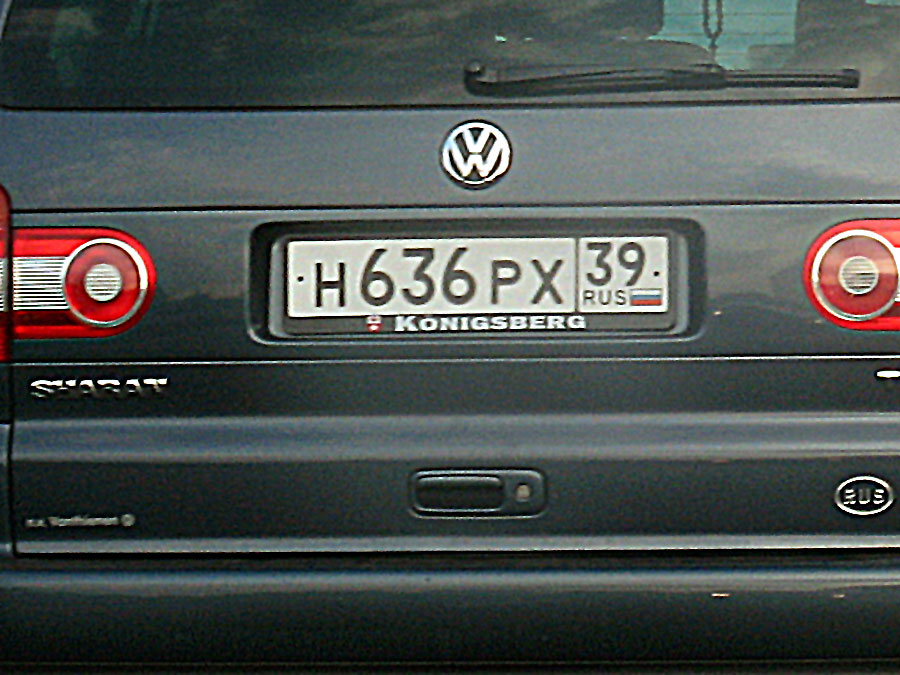
"Königsberg" license plate holder, 2009

In April 1946, northern East Prussia became an official province of the Russian Soviet Federative Socialist Republic as the "Kyonigsbergskaya Oblast", with the Klaipėda Region becoming part of the Lithuanian Soviet Socialist Republic. In June 1946, 114,070 German and 41,029 Soviet citizens were registered in the Oblast, with an unknown number of disregarded unregistered persons. In July of that year, the historic city of Königsberg was renamed Kaliningrad to honour Mikhail Kalinin and the area named the Kaliningrad Oblast. Between 24 August and 26 October 1948 21 transports with in total 42,094 Germans left the Oblast to the Soviet Occupation Zone (which became East Germany). The last remaining Germans left in November 1949 (1,401 persons) and January 1950 (7 persons).

The Prussian Lithuanians also experienced the same fate.

A similar fate befell the Curonians who lived in the area around the Curonian Lagoon. While many fled from the Red Army during the evacuation of East Prussia, Curonians that remained behind were subsequently expelled by the Soviet Union. Only 219 lived along the Curonian Spit in 1955. Many had German names such as Fritz or Hans, a cause for anti-German discrimination. The Soviet authorities considered the Curonians fascists. Because of this discrimination, many immigrated to West Germany in 1958, where the majority of Curonians now live.

After the expulsion of the German population ethnic Russians, Belarusians, and Ukrainians were settled in the northern part. In the Soviet part of the region, a policy of eliminating all remnants of German history was pursued. All German place names were replaced by new Russian names, with only a few instances of use of historical names, such as Domnovo and Talpaki, based on historical Polish names. The exclave was a military zone, which was closed to foreigners; Soviet citizens could only enter with special permission. In 1967, the remnants of Königsberg Castle were demolished on the orders of Leonid Brezhnev to make way for a new "House of the Soviets".

=== Modern status ===
Although the 1945–1949 expulsion of Germans from the northern part of former East Prussia was often conducted in a violent and aggressive way by Soviet officials, the present Russian inhabitants of the Kaliningrad Oblast have much less animosity towards Germans. German names have been revived in commercial Russian trade and there is sometimes talk of reverting Kaliningrad's name to its historical name of Königsberg. The city centre of Kaliningrad was completely rebuilt, as Royal Air Force bombs in 1944 and the Soviet siege in 1945 had left it in ruins.

Since the dissolution of the Soviet Union in 1991, some German groups have tried to help settle the Volga Germans from eastern parts of European Russia in the Kaliningrad Oblast. This effort was only a minor success, however, as most impoverished Volga Germans preferred to emigrate to the richer Federal Republic of Germany, where they could become German citizens through the right of return.

The Polish part of the region, divided in 1975 to form three units: the Olsztyn Voivodeship, the Elbląg Voivodeship, and the Suwałki Voivodeship, has been reestablished as a single entity in 1999 under the name of Warmian-Masurian Voivodeship, whose borders correspond closely to those of southern East Prussia. Since 2004, Poland and Lithuania have become European Union member states, and both the Polish part of the region as well as the Lithuanian Klaipėda Region, has thereafter become freely accessible by Germans, in line with the free movement of people policy.

== Demographics ==
=== Historical ethnic and religious structure ===
Mother tongues and religious confessions of East Prussia, 1905/1910

In year 1824, shortly before its merger with West Prussia, the population of East Prussia was 1,080,000 people. Of that number, according to Karl Andree, ethnic Germans were slightly more than half, while 280,000 (≈26%) were ethnically Polish and 200,000 (≈19%) were ethnically Lithuanian. As of year 1819, there were also 20,000 strong ethnic Curonian and Latvian minorities as well as 2,400 Jews, according to Georg Hassel. Similar numbers are given by August von Haxthausen in his 1839 book, with a breakdown by county. However, the majority of East Prussian Polish and Lithuanian inhabitants were Lutherans, not Roman Catholics like their ethnic kinsmen across the border in the Russian Empire. Only in southern Warmia Catholic Poles – so called Warmiaks (not to be confused with predominantly Protestant Masurians) – comprised the majority of population, numbering 26,067 people (≈81%) in county Allenstein (Polish: Olsztyn) in 1837. Another minority in pre-war East Prussia were ethnically Russian Old Believers, also known as Philipponnen – their main town was Eckertsdorf (Wojnowo), in Sensburg district.

In year 1817, East Prussia had 796,204 Evangelical Christians, 120,123 Roman Catholics, 864 Mennonites and 2,389 Jews.

The Old Prussian language had become extinct by the 17th or early 18th century.

=== Ethnolinguistic composition by district ===
Ethnolinguistic composition by district of East Prussia in 1905

As of 1905, the province of East Prussia was divided into three government regions, known as Regierungsbezirke. These were the regions of Königsberg, Gumbinnen and Allenstein.

The Low Prussian dialect predominated in East Prussia, although High Prussian was spoken in Warmia. The numbers of Masurians, Kursenieki and Prussian Lithuanians decreased over time due to the process of Germanization. The Polish-speaking population concentrated in the south of the province (Masuria and Warmia) and all German geographic atlases at the start of 20th century showed the southern part of East Prussia as Polish with the number of Polish-speakers estimated at the time to be 300,000. Kursenieki inhabited the areas around the Curonian lagoon, while Lithuanian-speaking Prussians concentrated in the northeast in (Lithuania Minor). The Old Prussian ethnic group became completely Germanized over time and the Old Prussian language died out in the early 18th century.

Ethnolinguistic structure of East Prussia by district (1905)
District (Kreis)	Regierungsbezirk	Population	German	%	Polish	%	Lithuanian	%
Braunsberg	Königsberg	54,751	54,548	99.6%	140	0.3%	12	0%
Fischhausen	Königsberg	52,430	52,235	99.6%	90	0.2%	43	0.1%
Friedland	Königsberg	40,822	40,784	99.9%	14	0%	5	0%
Gerdauen	Königsberg	33,983	33,778	99.4%	146	0.4%	1	0%
Heiligenbeil	Königsberg	43,951	43,909	99.9%	21	0%	2	0%
Heilsberg	Königsberg	51,690	51,473	99.6%	124	0.2%	8	0%
Landkreis Königsberg	Königsberg	45,486	45,342	99.7%	72	0.2%	12	0%
Stadtkreis Königsberg	Königsberg	223,770	221,167	98.8%	594	0.3%	159	0.1%
Labiau	Königsberg	51,295	45,659	89%	27	0.1%	5,293	10.3%
Memel	Königsberg	61,018	33,508	54.9%	40	0.1%	26,328	43.1%
Mohrungen	Königsberg	52,408	52,215	99.6%	113	0.2%	2	0%
Preußisch Eylau	Königsberg	49,465	49,325	99.7%	91	0.2%	3	0%
Preußisch Holland	Königsberg	38,599	38,505	99.8%	61	0.2%	4	0%
Rastenburg	Königsberg	46,985	45,998	97.9%	723	1.5%	19	0%
Wehlau	Königsberg	46,774	46,401	99.2%	178	0.4%	81	0.2%
Total (Königsberg)	Königsberg	893,427	854,847	95.7%	2,434	0.3%	31,972	3.6%
Angerburg	Gumbinnen	35,945	34,273	95.3%	1,499	4.2%	39	0.1%
Darkehmen	Gumbinnen	32,285	32,137	99.5%	74	0.2%	17	0.1%
Goldap	Gumbinnen	43,829	42,891	97.9%	436	1%	185	0.4%
Gumbinnen	Gumbinnen	50,918	50,703	99.6%	21	0%	21	0%
Heydekrug	Gumbinnen	43,268	19,124	44.2%	35	0.1%	23,279	53.8%
Landkreis Insterburg	Gumbinnen	46,237	45,693	98.8%	68	0.1%	311	0.7%
Stadtkreis Insterburg	Gumbinnen	28,902	28,412	98.3%	166	0.6%	62	0.2%
Niederung	Gumbinnen	55,129	47,792	86.7%	47	0.1%	6,497	11.8%
Oletzko	Gumbinnen	38,536	24,575	63.8%	12,451	32.3%	8	0%
Pilkallen	Gumbinnen	46,230	41,982	90.8%	65	0.1%	3,668	7.9%
Ragnit	Gumbinnen	54,741	45,525	83.2%	80	0.1%	8,394	15.3%
Stallupönen	Gumbinnen	43,875	43,099	98.2%	90	0.2%	383	0.9%
Landkreis Tilsit	Gumbinnen	46,441	25,322	54.5%	38	0.1%	20,674	44.5%
Stadtkreis Tilsit	Gumbinnen	37,148	35,598	95.8%	37	0.1%	1,442	3.9%
Total (Gumbinnen)	Gumbinnen	603,484	517,126	85.7%	15,107	2.5%	64,980	10.8%
Allenstein	Allenstein	85,625	45,723	53.4%	38,701	45.2%	21	0%
Johannisburg	Allenstein	50,452	13,651	27.1%	35,433	70.2%	5	0%
Lötzen	Allenstein	41,609	21,997	52.9%	16,877	40.6%	27	0.1%
Lyck	Allenstein	55,790	23,562	42.2%	30,555	54.8%	2	0%
Neidenburg	Allenstein	57,325	16,304	28.4%	38,690	67.5%	5	0%
Ortelsburg	Allenstein	69,464	17,221	24.8%	50,665	72.9%	58	0.1%
Osterode	Allenstein	73,421	39,778	54.2%	33,129	45.1%	13	0%
Rößel	Allenstein	50,390	42,555	84.5%	7,383	14.7%	15	0%
Sensburg	Allenstein	49,187	21,960	44.6%	25,381	51.6%	13	0%
Total (Allenstein)	Allenstein	533,263	242,751	45.5%	276,814	51.9%	159	0%
Total (East Prussia)	-	2,030,174	1,614,724	79.5%	294,355	14.5%	97,111	4.8%

== Administration ==
The Prussian central government appointed for every province an Oberpräsident ("Upper President") carrying out central prerogatives on the provincial level and supervising the implementation of central policy on the lower levels of administration.

Since 1875, with the strengthening of self-rule, the urban and rural districts (Kreise) within each province (sometimes within each governorate) formed a corporation with common tasks and assets (schools, traffic installations, hospitals, cultural institutions, jails etc.) called the Provinzialverband (provincial association). Initially the assemblies of the urban and rural districts elected representatives for the provincial diets (Provinziallandtage), which were thus indirectly elected. As of 1919, the provincial diets (or as to governorate diets, the so-called Kommunallandtage) were directly elected by the citizens of the provinces (or governorates, respectively). These parliaments legislated within the competences transferred to the provincial associations. The provincial diet of East Prussia elected a provincial executive body (government), the provincial committee (Provinzialausschuss), and a head of province, the Landeshauptmann ("Land Captain"; till the 1880s titled Landdirektor, land director).

=== Upper presidents of East Prussia and the Province of Prussia ===
The office of Oberpräsident (Upper President) served as the senior civil administrator in a Prussian province. Before 1815, similar duties were carried out by the presidents of the Gumbinnen and Königsberg War and Demesnes Chambers. East Prussia and West Prussia were administered jointly as the Province of Prussia between 1824 and 1878; the list below reflects those periods of shared administration.

Political affiliations (where applicable):

- SPD – Social Democratic Party of Germany
- DDP – German Democratic Party
- DNVP – German National People's Party
- NSDAP – Nazi Party

1765–1791 – Johann Friedrich von Domhardt, president of the Gumbinnen and Königsberg War and Demesnes Chambers
1791–1808 – Friedrich Leopold von Schrötter, president of the Gumbinnen and Königsberg War and Demesnes Chambers; from 1795, Minister for East and New East Prussia
1808–1814 – Vacant
1814–1824 – Hans Jakob von Auerswald, Upper President of East Prussia
1824–1842 – Heinrich Theodor von Schön, Upper President of the merged Province of Prussia (previously Upper President of West Prussia from 1816)
1842–1848 – Carl Wilhelm von Bötticher, Upper President of the Province of Prussia
1848–1849 – Rudolf von Auerswald, Upper President of the Province of Prussia
1849–1850 – Eduard Heinrich von Flottwell (1786–1865), Upper President of the Province of Prussia
1850–1868 – Franz August Eichmann, Upper President of the Province of Prussia
1868–1869 – Vacant
1869–1882 – Carl Wilhelm Heinrich Georg von Horn, Upper President of the Province of Prussia (from 1878, Upper President of East Prussia)
1882–1891 – Albrecht Heinrich von Schlieckmann, Upper President of East Prussia
1891–1895 – Count Udo zu Stolberg-Wernigerode, Upper President of East Prussia
1895–1901 – Count Wilhelm von Bismarck-Schönhausen, Upper President of East Prussia
1901–1903 – Hugo Samuel von Richthofen, Upper President of East Prussia
1903–1907 – Count Friedrich von Moltke, Upper President of East Prussia
1907–1914 – Ludwig von Windheim, Upper President of East Prussia
1914–1916 – Adolf Tortilowicz von Batocki-Friebe, Upper President of East Prussia
1916–1918 – Friedrich von Berg, Upper President of East Prussia
1918–1919 – Adolf Tortilowicz von Batocki-Friebe, Upper President of East Prussia
1919–1920 – August Winnig (SPD), Upper President of East Prussia
1920–1932 – Ernst Siehr (DDP), Upper President of East Prussia
1932–1933 – Wilhelm Kutscher (DNVP), Upper President of East Prussia
1933–1945 – Erich Koch (NSDAP), Upper President of East Prussia

=== Elections to the provincial diets ===
Summary of the East Prussian Provincial Diet direct election results
Parties	% 1921	± 1921	Seats 1921	± 1921	% 1925	± 1925	Seats 1925	± 1925	% 1929	± 1929	Seats 1929	± 1929	% 1933	± 1933	Seats 1933	± 1933
SPD	24.1		20		24.8	+0.7 (-)	22	+2 (−4)	26	+1.2	23	+1	13.6	-12.4	12	-11
USPD			6	+6	merged in SPD	+0.7 (-)	22	+2 (−4)	26	+1.2	23	+1	13.6	-12.4	12	-11
DNVP	13.4	+13.4	11	+11	45.6		40	(+4)	31.2	(+17.8)	27	(+16)	12.7	−18.5	11	−16
DVP	3.6	+3.6	4	+4	45.6		40	(+4)	8.7	(+5.1)	8	(+4)			0	−8
BWA			16	+16			0	−16			0	0			0	0
Zentrum	9.3		8	+8	6.9	−2.4	6	−2	8.1	+1.2	7	+1	7	−1.1	7	0
KPD	7	+7	6	+6	6.9	−0.1	6	0	8.6	+1.7	8	+2	6	−2.6	6	−2
BWW			6	+6			0	−6			0	0			0	0
Parties	% 1921	± 1921	Seats 1921	± 1921	% 1925	± 1925	Seats 1925	± 1925	% 1929	± 1929	Seats 1929	± 1929	% 1933	± 1933	Seats 1933	± 1933
DDP	5.7	+5.7	6	+6	3.6	−2.1	3	−3	2.8	−0.8	3	0			0	−3
NSDAP	not run	not run	not run	not run					4.3		4	+4	58.2	+53,9	51	+47
LL/WP			2	+2	4.2	+4.2	4	+2	4	−1.2	4	0			0	−4
DFP	not run	not run	not run	not run	4.2	+4.2	4	+4			0	−4			0	0
CSVD	not run	not run	not run	not run	not run	not run	not run	not run	3	+3	3	+3			0	−3
AuA	not run	not run	not run	not run			2	+2			0	−2			0	0
FOW			2	+2			0	−2			0	0			0	0
Poles' Party			1	+1			0	−1			0	0			0	0
Others			2	+?			0	−2			0	0			0	0
Total 1921			85		Total 1925		87		Total 1929		87		Total 1933		87	

=== Land Directors and Land Captains of East Prussia ===
1876–1878: Heinrich Edwin Rickert (NLP, later DFP), titled land director
1878–1884: Kurt von Saucken-Tarputschen (Fortschritt, later DFP), titled land director
1884–1888: Alfred von Gramatzki (DKP), titled land director
1888–1896: Klemens von Stockhausen, titled land director
1896–1909: Rudolf von Brandt, titled land captain
1909–1916: Friedrich von Berg, titled land captain
1916–1928: Manfred Graf von Brünneck-Bellschwitz, titled land captain
1928–1936: Paul Blunk, titled land captain
1936–1941: Helmuth von Wedelstädt (NSDAP), titled land captain
1941–1945: vacancy
1941–1945: Reinhard Bezzenberger, first land councillor, per pro

=== Cities and towns ===
City/Town	District (Kreis)	Pop. in 1939	Current name	Current Administrative Unit
Allenburg	Landkreis Wehlau	2 694	Druzhba	Kaliningrad Oblast (Russia)
Allenstein	Landkreis Allenstein	50 396	Olsztyn	Warmian-Masurian Voivodeship (Poland)
Angerburg	Landkreis Angerburg	10 922	Węgorzewo (Węgobork)	Warmia-Masuria
Arys	Landkreis Johannisburg	3 553	Orzysz	Warmia-Masuria
Barten	Rastenburg	1 541	Barciany	Warmia-Masuria
Bartenstein	Landkreis Bartenstein	12 912	Bartoszyce	Warmia-Masuria
Bischofsburg	Landkreis Rößel		Biskupiec	Warmia-Masuria
Bischofstein (Ostpreußen)	Rößel	3 200	Bisztynek	Warmia-Masuria
Braunsberg	Landkreis Braunsberg	21 142	Braniewo	Warmia-Masuria
Darkehmen/Angerapp	Darkehmen		Ozyorsk	Kaliningrad
Domnau	Bartenstein		Domnovo	Kaliningrad
Elbing	Stadtkreis	85 952	Elbląg	Warmia-Masuria
Eydtkuhnen	Landkreis Stallupönen	4 922	Chernyshevskoye	Kaliningrad
Fischhausen	Landkreis Samland	3 879	Primorsk	Kaliningrad
Frauenburg (Ostpreußen)	Braunsberg	2 951	Frombork	Warmia-Masuria
Friedland (Ostpreußen)	Bartenstein		Pravdinsk	Kaliningrad
Gehlenburg	Johannisburg		Biała Piska	Warmia-Masuria
Gerdauen	Landkreis Gerdauen	5 118	Zheleznodorozhny	Kaliningrad
Gilgenburg	Landkreis Osterode	1 700	Dąbrówno	Warmia-Masuria
Goldap	Landkreis Goldap	12 786	Gołdap	Warmia-Masuria
Gumbinnen	Landkreis Gumbinnen	24 534	Gusev	Kaliningrad
Guttstadt	Landkreis Heilsberg		Dobre Miasto	Warmia-Masuria
Heiligenbeil	Landkreis Heiligenbeil	12 100	Mamonovo	Kaliningrad
Heilsberg	Kreis Heilsberg		Lidzbark Warmiński	Warmia-Masuria
Heydekrug	Landkreis Heydekrug	4 836	Šilutė	Klaipėda County (Lithuania)
Hohenstein	Osterode		Olsztynek	Warmia-Masuria
Insterburg	Landkreis Insterburg	48 711	Chernyakhovsk	Kaliningrad
Johannisburg	Johannisburg		Pisz (Jańsbork)	Warmia-Masuria
Königsberg (Preußen)	Stadtkreis	372 000	Kaliningrad	Kaliningrad
Kreuzburg (Ostpreußen)	Landkreis Preußisch Eylau		Slavskoye	Kaliningrad
Labiau	Landkreis Labiau	6 527	Polessk	Kaliningrad
Landsberg in Ostpreußen	Preußisch Eylau		Górowo Iławeckie	Warmia-Masuria
Liebemühl	Osterode		Miłomłyn	Warmia-Masuria
Liebstadt	Mohrungen	2 742	Miłakowo	Warmia-Masuria
Lötzen	Landkreis Lötzen	13 000	Giżycko (Lec)	Warmia-Masuria
Lyck	Landkreis Lyck	16 482	Ełk	Warmia-Masuria
Marggrabowa/Treuburg	Landkreis Oletzko/Treuburg		Olecko	Warmia-Masuria
Marienburg in Westpreußen	Marienburg		Malbork	Pomeranian Voivodeship (Poland)
Mehlsack	Braunsberg		Pieniężno (Melzak)	Warmia-Masuria
Memel	Stadtkreis	41 297	Klaipėda	Klaipėda
Mohrungen	Mohrungen	5 500	Morąg	Warmia-Masuria
Mühlhausen	Landkreis Preußisch Holland		Młynary	Warmia-Masuria
Neidenburg	Landkreis Neidenburg	9 201	Nidzica (Nibork)	Warmia-Masuria
Nikolaiken	Landkreis Sensburg		Mikołajki	Warmia-Masuria
Nordenburg	Gerdauen	3 173	Krylovo	Kaliningrad
Ortelsburg	Landkreis Ortelsburg	14 234	Szczytno	Warmia-Masuria
Osterode (Ostpreußen)	Osterode	19 519	Ostróda	Warmia-Masuria
Passenheim	Ortelsburg	2 431	Pasym	Warmia-Masuria
Peterswalde	Osterode		Piertzwald	Warmia-Masuria
Pillau	Samland	12 000	Baltiysk	Kaliningrad
Preußisch Eylau	Preußisch Eylau	7 485	Bagrationovsk	Kaliningrad
Preußisch Holland	Preußisch Holland		Pasłęk	Warmia-Masuria
Ragnit	Landkreis Tilsit-Ragnit	10 094	Neman	Kaliningrad
Rastenburg	Rastenburg	19 634	Kętrzyn (Rastembork)	Warmia-Masuria
Rhein (Ostpreußen)	Lötzen		Ryn	Warmia-Masuria
Rößel	Rößel	5 000	Reszel	Warmia-Masuria
Saalfeld	Mohrungen		Zalewo	Warmia-Masuria
Schippenbeil	Bartenstein		Sępopol	Warmia-Masuria
Schirwindt	Landkreis Pillkallen		Kutuzovo	Kaliningrad
Pillkallen-Schlossberg	Pillkallen		Dobrovolsk	Kaliningrad
Seeburg	Rößel		Jeziorany (Zybork)	Warmia-Masuria
Sensburg	Sensburg		Mrągowo (Żądzbork)	Warmia-Masuria
Soldau	Neidenburg	5 349	Działdowo	Warmia-Masuria
Stallupönen	Stallupönen	6 608	Nesterov	Kaliningrad
Tapiau	Wehlau	9 272	Gvardeysk	Kaliningrad
Tilsit	Stadtkreis	59 105	Sovetsk	Kaliningrad
Wartenburg (Ostpreußen)	Landkreis Allenstein	5 841	Barczewo (Wartembork)	Warmia-Masuria
Wehlau	Wehlau	7 348	Znamensk	Kaliningrad
Willenberg	Ortelsburg	2 600	Wielbark	Warmia-Masuria
Wormditt	Braunsberg		Orneta	Warmia-Masuria
Zinten	Heiligenbeil		Kornevo	Kaliningrad

== See also ==
- Drang nach Osten
- Junker (Prussia)
- Königsberger Klopse
- Königsberg marzipan
- Landsmannschaft Ostpreußen
- East Prussian Regional Museum
- Territorial losses of Germany in the 20th century
- Ostsiedlung

== Bibliography ==
Publications in English

- Baedeker, Karl, Northern Germany, 14th revised edition, London, 1904.
- Beevor, Antony (2002). "chapters 1-8". Berlin: The Downfall 1945. Penguin Books. ISBN 0-670-88695-5. Archived from the original on 5 February 2006. (on the years 1944/45)
- Alfred-Maurice de Zayas, " Nemesis at Potsdam". London, 1977. ISBN 0-8032-4910-1.
- Alfred-Maurice de Zayas, A Terrible Revenge: The Ethnic Cleansing of the East European Germans, 1944–1950, 1994, ISBN 0-312-12159-8
- Carsten, F. L. "East Prussia". History 33#119 (1948), pp. 241–246. JSTOR 24402359. Historiography of medieval and early modern period.
- Dickie, Reverend J.F., with E.Compton, Germany, A & C Black, London, 1912.
- Douglas, R.M.: Orderly and Humane. The Expulsion of the Germans after the Second World War. Yale University Press, 2012. ISBN 978-0300166606.
- von Treitschke, Heinrich, History of Germany – vol.1: The Wars of Emancipation, (translated by E & C Paul), Allen & Unwin, London, 1915.
- Powell, E. Alexander, Embattled Borders, London, 1928.
- Prausser, Steffen and Rees, Arfon: The Expulsion of the "German" Communities from Eastern Europe at the End of the Second World War. Florence, Italy, European University Institute, 2004.
- Naimark, Norman: Fires of Hatred. Ethnic Cleansing in Twentieth-Century Europe. Cambridge, Harvard University Press, 2001.
- Steed, Henry Wickham, Vital Peace – A Study of Risks, Constable & Co., London, 1936.
- Newman, Bernard, Danger Spots of Europe, London, 1938.
- Wieck, Michael: A Childhood Under Hitler and Stalin: Memoirs of a "Certified Jew", University of Wisconsin Press, 2003, ISBN 0-299-18544-3.
- Woodward, E.L., Butler, Rohan; Medlicott, W.N., Dakin, Douglas, & Lambert, M.E., et al. (editors), Documents on British Foreign Policy 1919–1939, Three Series, Her Majesty's Stationery Office (HMSO), London, numerous volumes published over 25 years. Cover the Versailles Treaty including all secret meetings; plebiscites and all other problems in Europe; includes all diplomatic correspondence from all states.
- Previté-Orton, C.W., professor, The Shorter Cambridge Medieval History, Cambridge University Press, 1952 (2 volumes).
- Balfour, Michael, and John Mair, Four-Power Control in Germany and Austria 1945–1946, Oxford University Press, 1956.
- Kopelev, Lev, To Be Preserved Forever, ("Хранить вечно"), 1976.
- Koch, H.W., professor, A History of Prussia, Longman, London, 1978/1984, (P/B), ISBN 0-582-48190-2
- Koch, H.W., professor, A Constitutional History of Germany in the 19th and 20th Centuries, Longman, London, 1984, (P/B), ISBN 0-582-49182-7
- MacDonogh, Giles, Prussia, Sinclair-Stevenson, London, 1994, ISBN 1-85619-267-9
- Nitsch, Gunter, Weeds Like Us, AuthorHouse, 2006, ISBN 978-1-4259-6755-0
- Denny, Isabel (2007). The fall of Hitler's fortress city : the battle of Konigsberg, 1945. Havertown, Penn.: Casemate. ISBN 978-1-61200-058-9. OCLC 783289112.
- Tooze, Adam (2006). The Wages of Destruction: The Making and Breaking of the Nazi Economy. New York: Viking. ISBN 978-0-670-03826-8.

Publications in German

- B. Schumacher: Geschichte Ost- und Westpreussens, Würzburg 1959
- Boockmann, Hartmut: Ostpreußen und Westpreußen (= Deutsche Geschichte im Osten Europas). Siedler, Berlin 1992, ISBN 3-88680-212-4
- Buxa, Werner and Hans-Ulrich Stamm: Bilder aus Ostpreußen
- Dönhoff, Marion Gräfin v. : Namen die keiner mehr nennt – Ostpreußen, Menschen und Geschichte
- Dönhoff, Marion Gräfin v.: Kindheit in Ostpreussen
- Falk, Lucy: Ich Blieb in Königsberg. Tagebuchblätter aus dunklen Nachkriegsjahren
- Kibelka, Ruth: Ostpreußens Schicksaljahre, 1945–1948
- Bernd, Martin (1998). Masuren, Mythos und Geschichte. Karlsruhe: Evangelische Akademie Baden. ISBN 83-85135-93-6.
- Nitsch, Gunter: "Eine lange Flucht aus Ostpreußen", Ellert & Richter Verlag, 2011, ISBN 978-3-8319-0438-9
- Wieck, Michael: Zeugnis vom Untergang Königsbergs: Ein "Geltungsjude" berichtet, Heidelberger Verlaganstalt, 1990, 1993, ISBN 3-89426-059-9.

Publications in French

- Pierre Benoît, Axelle
- Georges Blond, L'Agonie de l'Allemagne
- Michel Tournier, Le Roi des aulnes

Publications in Polish

- Górski, Karol (1949). Związek Pruski i poddanie się Prus Polsce: zbiór tekstów źródłowych (in Polish and Latin). Poznań: Instytut Zachodni.
- K. Piwarski (1946). Dzieje Prus Wschodnich w czasach nowożytnych. Gdańsk.
- Gerard Labuda, ed. (1969–2003). "Historia Pomorza", vol. I–IV. Poznań.
- collective work (1958–1961). "Szkice z dziejów Pomorza", vol. 1–3. Warszawa.
- Kossert, Andreas (2009). PRUSY WSCHODNIE, Historia i mit. Warszawa. ISBN 978-83-7383-354-8.
- Plater, Stanisław (1825). Jeografia wschodniéy części Europy czyli Opis krajów przez wielorakie narody słowiańskie zamieszkanych : obejmujący Prussy, Xsięztwo Poznańskie, Szląsk Pruski, Gallicyą, Rzeczpospolitę Krakowską, Krolestwo Polskie i Litwę [Geography of the Eastern Part of Europe, or Description of the Countries inhabited by Various Slavic Nations: Including Prussia, the Duchy of Posen, Prussian Silesia, Galicia, the Republic of Cracow, the Kingdom of Poland, and Lithuania] (in Polish). Wrocław: Wilhelm Bogumił Korn.
