= Allenstein (region) =

Governmental district of East Prussia from 1905 to 1945

Coordinates: 53°45′N 20°30′E

East Prussian Regierungsbezirk Allenstein (red), established in 1905

Regierungsbezirk Allenstein was a Regierungsbezirk, or government region, of the Prussian province of East Prussia from 1905 until 1945. The regional capital was Allenstein (present-day Olsztyn). The territory today is part of the Polish Warmian-Masurian Voivodeship.

== History ==
The government region was created on 1 November 1905 as the third East Prussian Regierungsbezirk out of the southern districts of the two original administrative regions Gumbinnen and Königsberg, which had been established in 1815. It comprised the south of the former Duchy of Prussia; the lands of the Allenstein and Rößel districts had belonged to the Prince-Bishopric of Warmia, annexed by Prussia in 1772. In the 1920 East Prussian plebiscite all the Allenstein Region plus the District of Oletzko was part of the Allenstein Plebiscite precinct, with the electorate voting for remaining with Germany by more than 97%.

In 1945 following World War II, Regierungsbezirk Allenstein was dissolved when East Prussia was partitioned between the Republic of Poland and the Soviet Union (Kaliningrad Oblast) and the Memel Territory was incorporated into the Sovjet Republic of Lithuania according to the resolutions at the Potsdam Conference.

== Demographics ==
The Allenstein region was ethnically mixed in 1910, with German, Polish and Masurian speakers.

Ethnolinguistic structure in Regierungsbezirk Allenstein (1910 census)
1910 census	Population	German		Masurian		Polish		Bilingual	
Allenstein Region	543,469	274,320	50.48%	175,016	32.20%	73,154	13.46%	19,532	3.59%
Allenstein Urban	33,077	29,344	88.71%	99	0.30%	2,249	6.80%	1,325	4.01%
Allenstein Rural	57,919	22,825	39.41%	520	0.90%	32,766	56.57%	1,782	3.08%
Johannisburg	51,399	16,379	31.87%	29,141	56.70%	4,203	8.18%	1,620	3.15%
Lötzen	41,209	26,352	63.95%	11,412	27.69%	1,595	3.87%	1,802	4.37%
Lyck	55,579	27,138	48.83%	19,407	34.92%	6,348	11.42%	2,590	4.66%
Neidenburg	59,416	20,871	35.13%	25,150	42.33%	10,462	17.61%	2,645	4.45%
Ortelsburg	69,935	20,218	28.91%	43,513	62.22%	3,390	4.85%	2,463	3.52%
Osterode	74,666	43,508	58.27%	26,695	35.75%	2,130	2.85%	2,279	3.05%
Rössel	50,472	43,189	85.57%	48	0.10%	6,512	12.90%	723	1.42%
Sensburg	50,097	24,496	48.90%	19,031	37.99%	3,499	6.98%	2,310	4.61%

== Districts ==
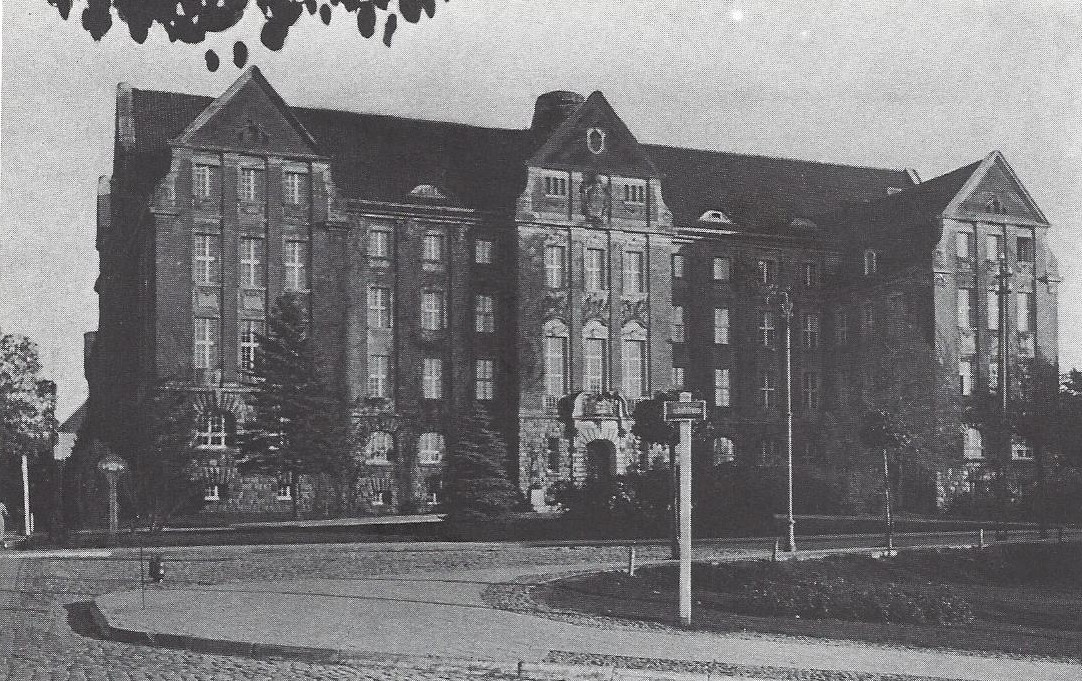
District office in Allenstein

As of 31 December 1937:

District	Capital (present name)	Area	Population
Allenstein, urban district	(Olsztyn)	52 km^{2} (20 sq mi)	46,513 (1939)
Allenstein, rural district	Allenstein (Olsztyn)	1,302.58 km^{2} (502.93 sq mi)	57,077 (1939)
Johannisburg	Johannisburg in East Prussia (Pisz)	1,684 km^{2} (650 sq mi)	52,672 (1939)
Lötzen	Lötzen (Giżycko)	898.8 km^{2} (347.0 sq mi)	47,681 (1939)
Lyck	Lyck (Ełk)	1,114 km^{2} (430 sq mi)	56,129 (1939)
Neidenburg	Neidenburg (Nidzica)	1,157 km^{2} (447 sq mi)	39,486 (1939)
Ortelsburg	Ortelsburg (Szczytno)	1,703 km^{2} (658 sq mi)	72,146 (1939)
Osterode in East Prussia	Osterode in East Prussia (Ostróda)	1,551 km^{2} (599 sq mi)	75,879 (1939)
Rößel	Bischofsburg (Biskupiec)	853 km^{2} (329 sq mi)	51,086 (1939)
Sensburg	Sensburg (Mrągowo)	1,234 km^{2} (476 sq mi)	52,746 (1939)
total	Allenstein	11,547 km^{2} (4,458 sq mi)	568,024
