= Darkehmen (district) =

District of Prussia

Details
Period	1818–1945
Country	Prussia; German Reich
Province	East Prussia
Regierungsbezirk	Gumbinnen
Capital	Darkehmen
Area	759,54 km^{2}
Population	31,549 (1939)

The Darkehmen district (from 1938: Angerapp district) was a Prussian district in East Prussia from 1818 to 1945. Its former territory is now divided between the Warmian-Masurian Voivodeship of Poland and the Kaliningrad Oblast of Russia.

== History ==
=== Kingdom of Prussia ===
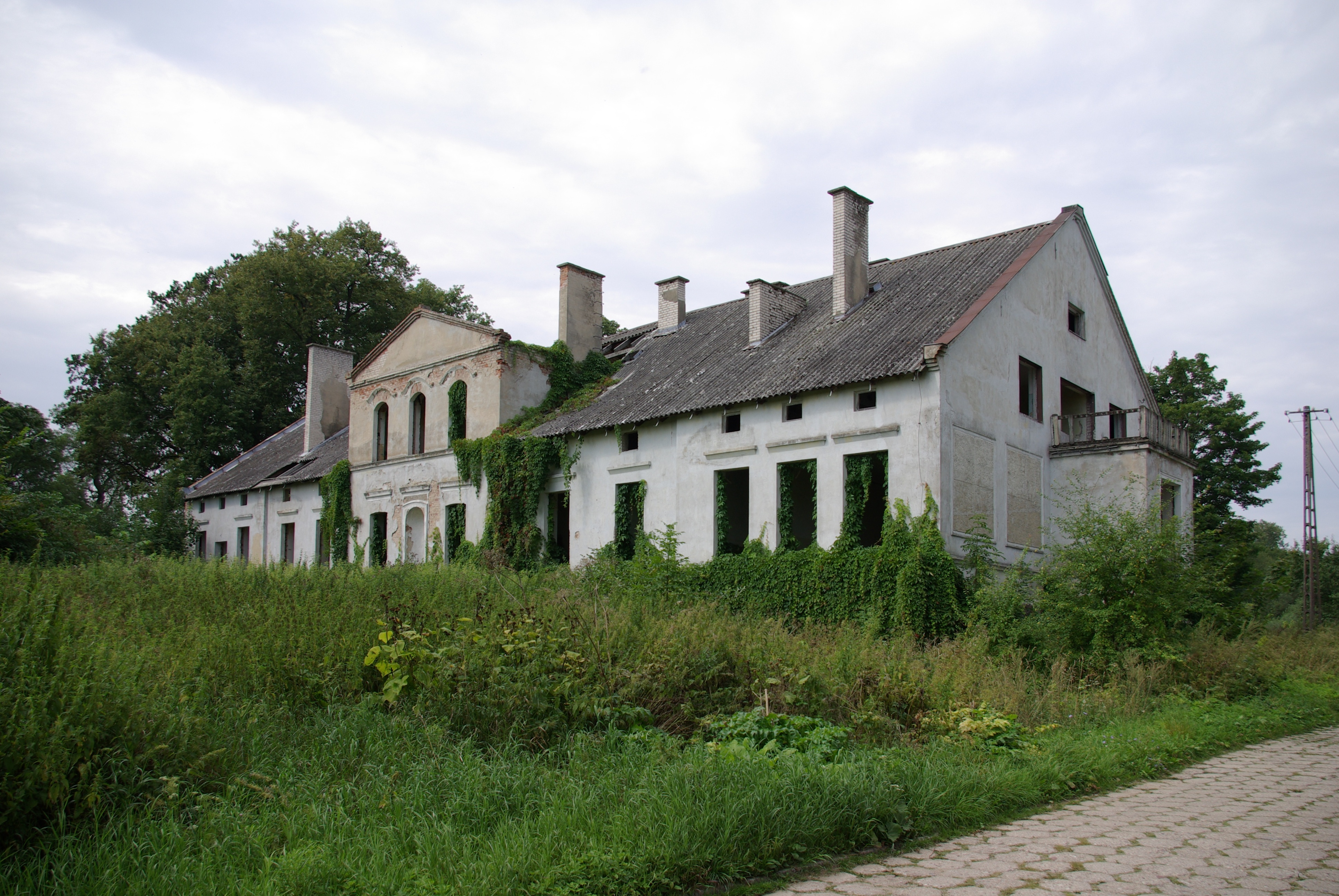
Ruins of a manor house from 1862 in Dąbrówka (Dombrowken)

The area of the Darkehmen district belonged to the former Insterburg district since East Prussia was divided into districts in 1752. As part of the Prussian administrative reforms, a comprehensive district reform was done in all of East Prussia, as the districts established in 1752 had proven to be inexpedient and too large. On 1 September 1818 the new Darkehmen district was formed in Regierungsbezirk Gumbinnen from parts of the old Insterburg district. This included the parishes of Ballethen, Darkehmen, Dombrowken, Groß Karpowen, Kleszowen, Rogahlen, Szabienen, Trempen and Wilhelmsberg. The district office was in Darkehmen.

=== Germany ===
Since 1871, the district belonged to the German Empire. On 21 July 1875 the rural community of Grünheide was transferred from the Darkehmen district to the Gumbinnen district. On 10 August 1876 the rural communities Alt Gurren and Neu Gurren and the Gurren manor district were transferred from the Darkehmen district to the Angerburg district, while the Broszeitschen manor district moved from the Angerburg district to the Darkehmen district.

On 30 September 1928 a regional reform took place in the Darkehmen district as in the rest of Prussia, in which all inhabited manor districts were dissolved and assigned to neighboring rural communities. On 7 September 1938 the district and its capital were renamed Angerapp.

=== Under Polish and Soviet administration ===
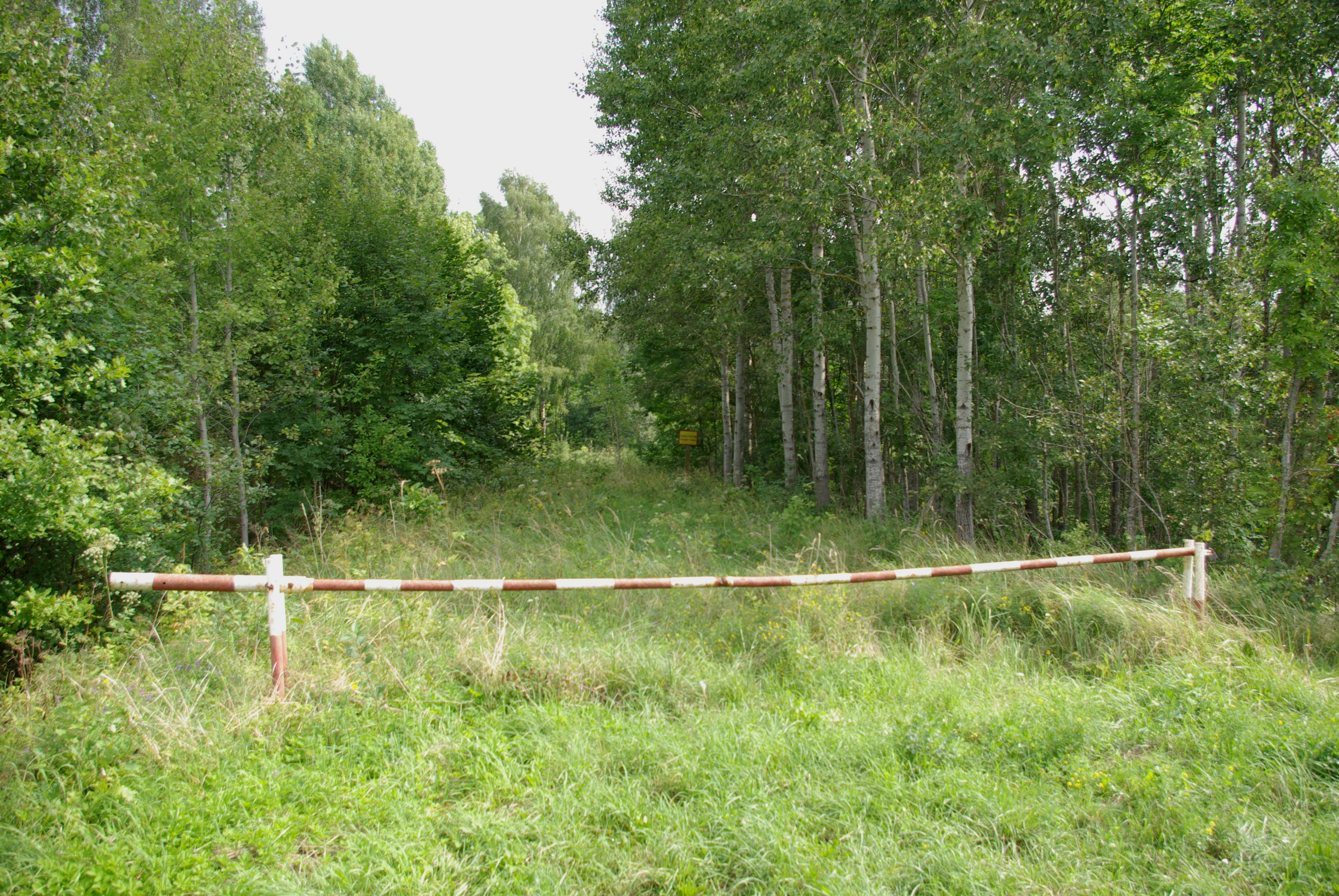
Former road interrupted by the Polish-Russian border between Rapa in the Polish Gołdap County and Ozyorsk in the Russian Kaliningrad Oblast.

With the Soviet advance into East Prussia which began in January 1945, the district was gradually occupied by the Red Army. The entire district was initially placed under the Polish civil administration. The district and its capital were given the name Darkiejmy, the Polish name for Darkehmen.

Later in 1945, the Soviet Union moved the border significantly to the south, so that a large part of the district, including the town of Darkehmen, which was renamed Ozyorsk came under Soviet administration.

Only a small part of the district south of the demarcation line remained under Polish administration and was attached to the Węgorzewo County. The remaining German population was subsequently expelled by the local Polish authorities.

== Demographics ==
The district had a predominantly German population along with small minorities of Lithuanians and Poles, who were gradually Germanized over the years.

	1831		1837		1846	
Germans	25,479	92.2%	26,651	95.0%	32,067	98.7%
Lithuanians	1,559	5.6%	1,068	3.8%	330	1.0%
Poles	611	2.2%	339	1.2%	91	0.3%
Total	27,649		28,058		32,488	

== Municipalities ==
After the municipal reform of 1928, the Darkehmen district included the town of Darkehmen, 162 other municipalities and a forest estate district.
