= Lissy =

Lissy may refer to:

== Given name ==
- Lissy (actress) (born 1967), Indian actress
- Lissy Arna, German film actress Elisabeth Arndt (1900–1964)
- Lissy Gröner (1954–2019), German politician
- Lissy Jarvik (1924–2021), American psychiatrist
- Lissy Macleod (born 1994), English cricketer
- Lissy Samuel (born 1967), Indian cricketer
- Lissy Schmidt (c. 1959–1994), German journalist
- Lissy Trullie, stage name of American singer-songwriter Elizabeth McChesney (born 1984)
- Lissy Vadakkel, Indian Roman Catholic nun

== Other uses ==
- Lissy (commune), a commune in north-central France
- Lissy (film), a 1957 East German film directed by Konrad Wolf

== See also ==
- Lisy (disambiguation)
- Lissie, American singer-songwriter Elisabeth Corrin Maurus (born 1982)
- Lizzie (disambiguation)
