= Zabin =

Zabin may refer to the following places in Poland:

- Żabin, Lower Silesian Voivodeship (south-west Poland)
- Żabin, Masovian Voivodeship (east-central Poland)
- Żabin, Warmian-Masurian Voivodeship (north Poland)
- Żabin, West Pomeranian Voivodeship (north-west Poland)
- Ząbin, Kuyavian-Pomeranian Voivodeship (north-central Poland)
- Żabin Łukowski, Gmina Karniewo, Maków County, Masovian Voivodeship
- Stary Żabin (Old Żabin), in Gmina Banie Mazurskie, Gołdap County, Warmian-Masurian Voivodeship

== See also ==
- Laurie Schwab Zabin, American public health researcher and professor
- Mashal Mohammed Zabin, Jordanian general
