= Angerapp =

Angerapp can refer to the German name of:

- Angrapa, a river that begins in northeastern Poland and ends in the Kaliningrad Oblast
- Darkehmen district, former administrative district in East Prussia
- Ozyorsk, Kaliningrad Oblast, town in the Kaliningrad Oblast
- Rapa, Poland, village in Poland
