= Liski =

Liski may refer to:

== Places ==
- Liski (Lošinj), a place on the island of Lošinj, Croatia
- Liski, Iran, a village in South Khorasan Province, Iran
- Liski, Gmina Dołhobyczów in Lublin Voivodeship, east Poland
- Liski, Gmina Horodło in Lublin Voivodeship, east Poland
- Liski, Bartoszyce County in Warmian-Masurian Voivodeship, north Poland
- Liski, Ełk County in Warmian-Masurian Voivodeship, north Poland
- Liski, Gołdap County in Warmian-Masurian Voivodeship, north Poland
- Liski, Pisz County in Warmian-Masurian Voivodeship, north Poland
- Liski Urban Settlement, an administrative division and a municipal formation comprising the town of Liski and the khutor of Kalach in Voronezh Oblast, Russia
- Liski, Russia, several inhabited localities in Russia
- Liski (Kiliya raion), a village in Odesa Oblast, Ukraine

== People ==
- Paavo Liski (1939–2005), Honorary Professor in Arts, theater manager, theater director. Finnish actor featured as private Rokka in The Unknown Soldier, Aapo, Friends, Comrades or Poet and Muse
- Petri Liski (born 1965), Finnish actor in Finnish National Theater. Drummer, songwriter and producer in pop-rock band Adam & Eve. Host in the Finnish version of The Price Is Right. Featured in Salatut elämät and Uusi päivä.
- Erkki Liski (born 1947), Emeritus Professor of Statistics in University of Tampere. (Co)author of seven books and over one hundred scientific papers. A wide variety of courses at both undergraduate and postgraduate level and numerous management positions.

== Other uses ==
- FC Lokomotiv Liski, a Russian association football club from Liski, Voronezh Oblast, Russia

== See also ==
- Lisky (disambiguation)
