= Szarek (disambiguation) =

Szarek may refer to:

- Szarek, Ełk County, village in Warmian-Masurian Voivodeship, Poland
- Szarek, Gołdap County, village in Warmian-Masurian Voivodeship, Poland
- Szarek (surname)
