= Popioły =

Popioły may refer to:

- Popioły (novel), by Stefan Żeromski
- Popioły (film), a 1965 Polish film
- Popioły, Kuyavian-Pomeranian Voivodeship, a former village in Poland
- Popioły, Warmian-Masurian Voivodeship, a village in Poland
