= Skidel revolt =

1939 revolt in Nowogródek Voivodeship, Second Polish Republic (now Belarus)

- Part of the Polish-Belarusian ethnic conflict and the invasion of Poland
Date	18–19 September 1939
Location	Skidzyelʹ, Białystok Voivodeship, Second Polish Republic 53°35′00″N 24°15′00″E
Result	Uprising suppressed; Skidel taken by Soviet forces the next day

Belligerents
Second Polish Republic	Communist Party of Western Belorussia

Strength
100 soldiers and police officers	Unknown

Casualties and losses
Several killed	Soviet estimates 18–31 killed 70 arrested

The Skidel Revolt (Polish: Powstanie Skidelskie, Belarusian: Скідзельскае паўстанне) or Skidal Uprising (term used in Soviet historiography) was an anti-state and anti-Polish sabotage action done by Jewish and Belarusian inhabitants of the Polish town of Skidel near Grodno (now Skidzieĺ, Belarus) at the onset of World War II. It began on the second day of the Soviet invasion of Poland to support the external attack.

== The events ==
The revolt of 18 September 1939 was organised by the Communist Party of West Belarus, which was outlawed by Poland in 1938. According to Russian documents, it consisted of around 200 men, although Polish historian Marek Wierzbicki has contested this number as exaggerated. A group of Jews and Belarusians, members and sympathizers of the delegalized Communist Party, all citizens of Poland, took control of the town of Skidel and some nearby locations, acquired firearms, often from skirmishes with Polish Army units and police. Similar incidents of various severity, with pro-communist activists attacking and taking over local government offices, arresting or fighting with Polish police and army personnel, took place in numerous nearby settlements including Jeziory, Wiercieliszki, Wielka Brzostowica, Dubno, Wołpa, Indura (near Grodno), Sopoćkinie, Zelwa, Wołkowysk, Ostryna, Zdzięcioł (near Nowogródek), Janów Poleski, Horodec, Antopol, Drohiczyn Poleski and Motol nearby among other locations. In a number of instances, individual or groups of former authority figures, such as civil servants, landowners, priests, rural settlers, policemen and reserve officers, usually of Polish ethnicity, were murdered, including in Skidel, Brzostowica Mała, Lerypol, Budowla, and other locations. Wierzbicki estimates that there were dozens if not hundreds of such incidents.

Several Polish families were rescued by their Belarusian neighbours in the village of Sawalówka.

In some settlements, the withdrawal of Polish administration ahead of the Soviet advance prompted Jewish councils to form self-defence groups against the Belarusian raids, which further complicated the issue of allegiance. Some of the self-defending Jews were driven by deep-seated Polish patriotism.

Polish Army units quickly engaged the insurgents. On 19 September 1939, the Polish Army's 102nd Uhlan Regiment engaged some insurgents around Ostryna, Dubno and Jeziory. After some skirmishes, Polish units put down the revolt and took control of Skidel and neighbouring settlements. The insurgents captured with weapons were summarily executed. Shortly afterwards, on 20 September, advancing Red Army units, supported by armour, took over Skidel, pushing the Polish forces back.

== Aftermath ==
When Soviet forces took over Skidel, many Poles were immediately arrested. Some time later in 1940, there was a show trial in Skidel of 15 individuals, including three women, two Tartars and two Polish Russians, who aided the Polish Army, which briefly retook Skidel on 19 September. They were accused of crimes against the Soviet Union. There is no historical record of what happened to them, although Wierzbicki states that fragmentary information and "common practice" suggest that at least some of them were executed. After the end of World War II, and the annexation of eastern Poland, the mass murders and robberies were hushed up and the sabotage action in Skidzieĺ turned by the Soviet Union into a province-wide liberation movement.

In 1940, the Soviet authorities found clear evidence of the widespread robberies and mass murders committed on the side by scores of intoxicated peasants and criminal opportunists, but after the intervention of the communist party representative, the Soviet court threw out the case citing political rationale (justified class struggle), as well as procedural reasons (that it has no jurisdiction to persecute crimes that happened on those territories before the Soviet annexation of them on, that legal documents dated to 2 November 1939). After the annexation of eastern Poland, the Soviet propaganda turned the Skidzieĺ events into a liberation movement and mythologised them.

== See also ==
- War crimes in occupied Poland during World War II
