= Wróbel (disambiguation) =

Wróbel is a Polish surname literally meaning "sparrow".

Wróbel or Wrobel may also refer to:

- Wróbel, Warmian-Masurian Voivodeship, village in northern Poland
- Henryk Wróbel was the Polish nickname of Henry VIII the Sparrow
- Wrobel Vroby 2, French powered parachute
- ZU-23-2M "Wróbel", Polish naval version of ZU-23-2 anti-aircraft twin-barreled autocannon
