= Lisy =

Lisy may refer to:

== People ==
- Lisy Fischer, Swiss pianist
- Lisy Kane, Australian video game producer

== Places ==
- Lisy, Lublin Voivodeship, east Poland
- Lisy, Podlaskie Voivodeship, north-east Poland
- Lisy, Warsaw, a neighbourhood in Warsaw, Masovian Voivodeship, Poland
- Lisy, Gołdap County, in Warmian-Masurian Voivodeship, Poland
- Lisy, Pisz County, in Warmian-Masurian Voivodeship, Poland

== See also ==
- Lissy (disambiguation)
- Lisii Island, in the Russian Far East
