= Maciejowa Wola =

- Village
- Location within Poland
- Coordinates: 54°18′N 22°7′E
- Country: Poland
- Voivodeship: Warmian-Masurian
- County: Gołdap
- Gmina: Banie Mazurskie
- Time zone: UTC+1 (CET)
  - Summer (DST): UTC+2 (CEST)
- Vehicle registration: NGO

Maciejowa Wola [mat͡ɕɛˈjɔva ˈvɔla] is a village in the administrative district of Gmina Banie Mazurskie, within Gołdap County, Warmian-Masurian Voivodeship, in north-eastern Poland, close to the border with the Kaliningrad Oblast of Russia. It is part of the region of Masuria and lies approximately 9 km (6 mi) north-east of Banie Mazurskie, 13 km (8 mi) west of Gołdap, and 121 km (75 mi) north-east of the regional capital Olsztyn.

The village was founded by Polish people.
