= Bogumiły, Węgorzewo County =

Bogumiły
- Settlement
- Location within Poland
- Coordinates: 54°14′30″N 21°51′57″E
- Country: Poland
- Voivodeship: Warmian-Masurian
- County: Węgorzewo
- Gmina: Budry

Bogumiły [bɔɡuˈmiwɨ] (German: Amalienhof) is a settlement in the administrative district of Gmina Budry, within Węgorzewo County, Warmian-Masurian Voivodeship, in northern Poland, close to the border with the Kaliningrad Oblast of Russia.
