= Żabin Graniczny =

- Village
- Location within Poland
- Coordinates: 54°20′N 22°4′E
- Country: Poland
- Voivodeship: Warmian-Masurian
- County: Gołdap
- Gmina: Banie Mazurskie

Żabin Graniczny [ˈʐabin ɡraˈnit͡ʂnɨ] is a village in the administrative district of Gmina Banie Mazurskie, within Gołdap County, Warmian-Masurian Voivodeship, in northern Poland, 200 metres (219 yd) from the border with the Kaliningrad Oblast of Russia.
