= Brzozówko =

- Village
- Location within Poland
- Coordinates: 54°14′N 21°53′E
- Country: Poland
- Voivodeship: Warmian-Masurian
- County: Węgorzewo
- Gmina: Budry
- Founded: 1554
- Founder: Maciej Bogacz
- Time zone: UTC+1 (CET)
  - Summer (DST): UTC+2 (CEST)
- Vehicle registration: NWE

Brzozówko [bʐɔˈzufkɔ] is a village in the administrative district of Gmina Budry, within Węgorzewo County, Warmian-Masurian Voivodeship, in northern Poland, close to the border with the Kaliningrad Oblast of Russia.

Brzozówko was established in 1554 by Maciej Bogacz, who bought land to establish the village.
