= Mieczniki =

- Village
- Location within Poland
- Coordinates: 54°14′17″N 22°0′16″E
- Country: Poland
- Voivodeship: Warmian-Masurian
- County: Gołdap
- Gmina: Banie Mazurskie
- Population (2006): 110
- Number Zone: (+48) 87
- Vehicle registration: NGO

Mieczniki [mjɛt͡ʂˈniki] is a village in the administrative district of Gmina Banie Mazurskie, within Gołdap County, Warmian-Masurian Voivodeship, in northern Poland, close to the border with the Kaliningrad Oblast of Russia.
