= Kulsze =

- Village
- Location within Poland
- Coordinates: 54°16′N 22°5′E
- Country: Poland
- Voivodeship: Warmian-Masurian
- County: Gołdap
- Gmina: Banie Mazurskie
- Founded: 1576
- Time zone: UTC+1 (CET)
  - Summer (DST): UTC+2 (CEST)
- Vehicle registration: NGO

Kulsze [ˈkulʂɛ] is a village in the administrative district of Gmina Banie Mazurskie, within Gołdap County, Warmian-Masurian Voivodeship, in north-eastern Poland, close to the border with the Kaliningrad Oblast of Russia. It is located in the historic region of Masuria.

== History ==
The origins of the village date back to 1576, when Maciej Sapała bought land to establish a village. For centuries, it remained an ethnically Polish village.
