= Pawłowo, Węgorzewo County =

Pawłowo
- Village
- Location within Poland
- Coordinates: 54°16′N 21°47′E
- Country: Poland
- Voivodeship: Warmian-Masurian
- County: Węgorzewo
- Gmina: Budry
- Population: 210

Pawłowo [paˈvwɔvɔ] (German: Paulswalde) is a village in the administrative district of Gmina Budry, within Węgorzewo County, Warmian-Masurian Voivodeship, in northern Poland, close to the border with the Kaliningrad Oblast of Russia.

The village has a population of 210.
