= Mieduniszki Wielkie =

- Village
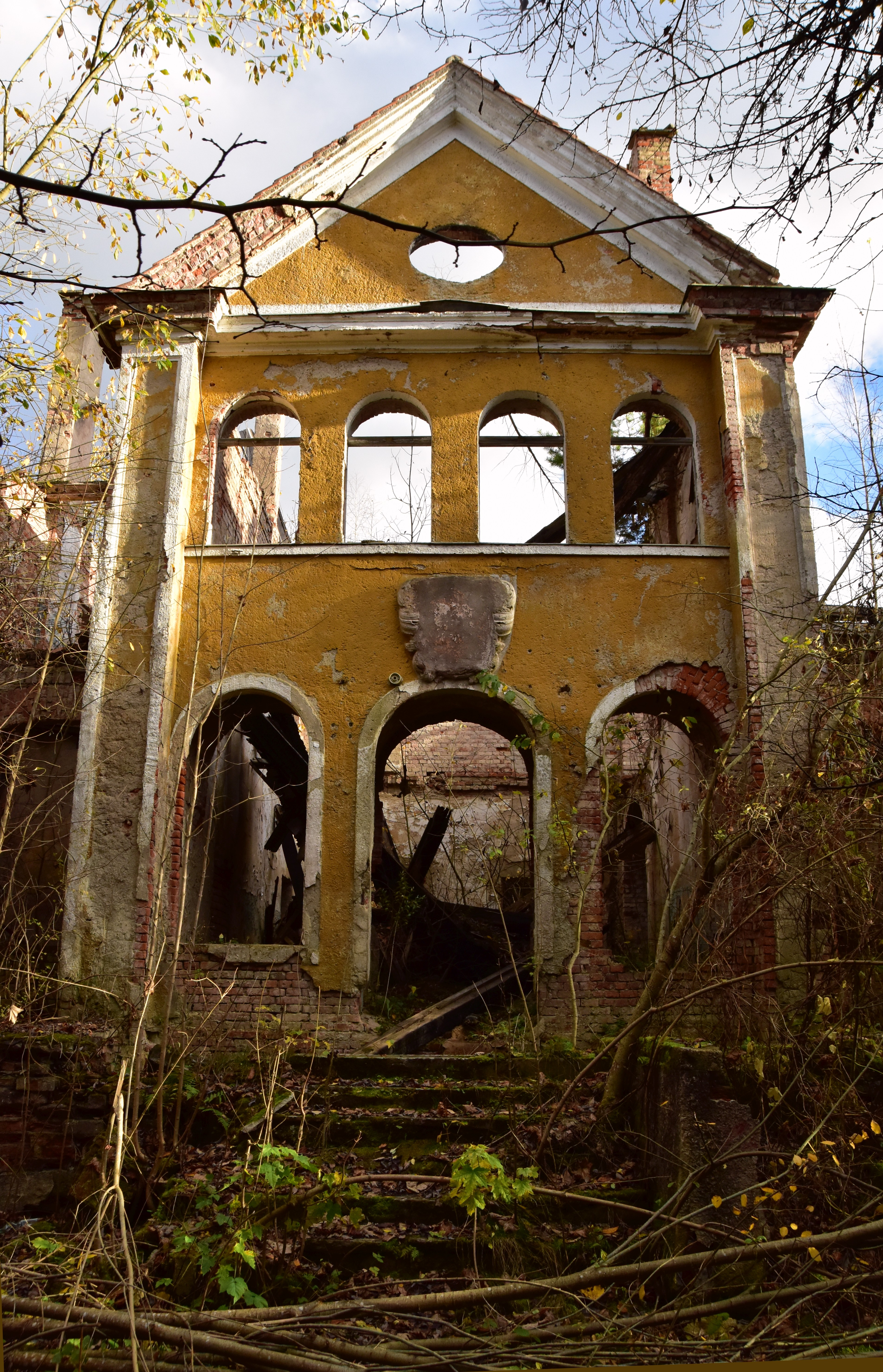
- Manor house ruins in Mieduniszki Wielkie

- Location within Poland
- Coordinates: 54°19′17″N 21°58′54″E
- Country: Poland
- Voivodeship: Warmian-Masurian
- County: Gołdap
- Gmina: Banie Mazurskie
- Population: 100
- Time zone: UTC+1 (CET)
  - Summer (DST): UTC+2 (CEST)
- Vehicle registration: NGO

Mieduniszki Wielkie [mjɛduˈniʂki ˈvjɛlkʲɛ] is a village in the administrative district of Gmina Banie Mazurskie, within Gołdap County, Warmian-Masurian Voivodeship, in northern Poland, close to the border with the Kaliningrad Oblast of Russia.
