= Kierzki, Warmian-Masurian Voivodeship =

Kierzki
- Village
- Location within Poland
- Coordinates: 54°11′42″N 22°6′27″E
- Country: Poland
- Voivodeship: Warmian-Masurian
- County: Gołdap
- Gmina: Banie Mazurskie
- Founded: 1710
- Population: 120
- Time zone: UTC+1 (CET)
  - Summer (DST): UTC+2 (CEST)
- Vehicle registration: NGO

Kierzki [ˈkʲɛʂki] is a village in the administrative district of Gmina Banie Mazurskie, within Gołdap County, Warmian-Masurian Voivodeship, in north-eastern Poland, close to the border with the Kaliningrad Oblast of Russia. It is located in the historic region of Masuria.

The village was founded by Polish people in 1710.
