= Kruki, Warmian-Masurian Voivodeship =

Kruki
- Village
- Location within Poland
- Coordinates: 54°19′19″N 22°06′18″E
- Country: Poland
- Voivodeship: Warmian-Masurian
- County: Gołdap
- Gmina: Banie Mazurskie

Kruki [ˈkruki] is a village in the administrative district of Gmina Banie Mazurskie, within Gołdap County, Warmian-Masurian Voivodeship, in northern Poland, close to the border with the Kaliningrad Oblast of Russia.
