= Wola, Węgorzewo County =

Wola
- Village
- Location within Poland
- Coordinates: 54°14′15″N 21°49′5″E
- Country: Poland
- Voivodeship: Warmian-Masurian
- County: Węgorzewo
- Gmina: Budry
- Population: 80

Wola [ˈvɔla] (German: Freydorf) is a village in the administrative district of Gmina Budry, within Węgorzewo County, Warmian-Masurian Voivodeship, in northern Poland, close to the border with the Kaliningrad Oblast of Russia.

The village has a population of 80.
