= Brożajcie =

- Settlement
- Location within Poland
- Coordinates: 54°18′N 21°58′E
- Country: Poland
- Voivodeship: Warmian-Masurian
- County: Gołdap
- Gmina: Banie Mazurskie
- Time zone: UTC+1 (CET)
  - Summer (DST): UTC+2 (CEST)

Brożajcie [brɔˈʐai̯t͡ɕɛ] is an abandoned settlement in the administrative district of Gmina Banie Mazurskie, within Gołdap County, Warmian-Masurian Voivodeship, in north-eastern Poland, close to the border with the Kaliningrad Oblast of Russia.

The Taszycki Polish noble family lived in the village.
