= Skidzyelʹ =

Town in Grodno Region, Belarus

Skidzyelʹ Скідзель (Belarusian) Скидель (Russian) Skidel
- Town
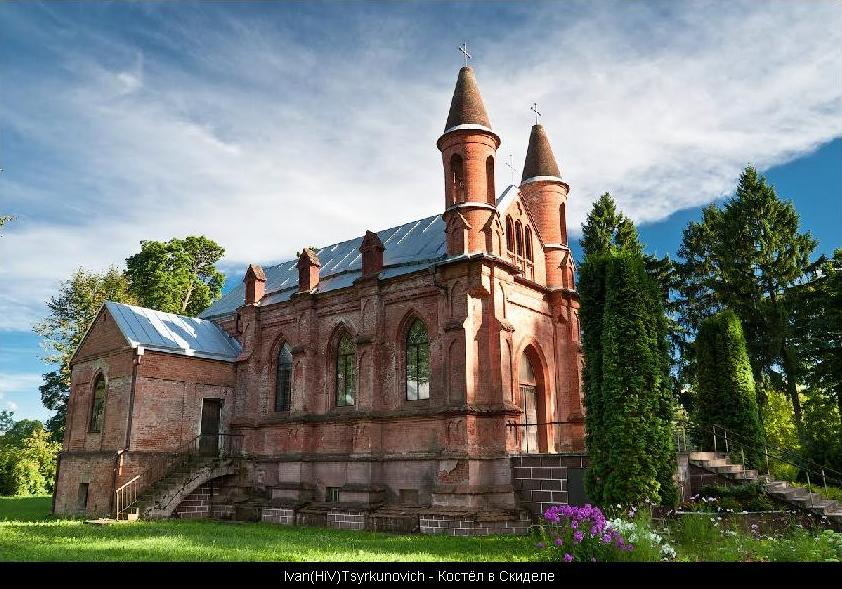

- Flag Coat of arms

- Location within Belarus
- Coordinates: 53°35′00″N 24°15′00″E
- Country: Belarus
- Region: Grodno Region
- District: Grodno District

Population (2025)
  - Total: 9,667
- Time zone: UTC+3 (MSK)
- Postal code: 231761
- Area code: +375 152
- License plate: 4

Skidzyelʹ or Skidel (Note: Belarusian: Скідзель, romanized: Skidzieĺ; Russian: Скидель; Lithuanian: Skidlius; Polish: Skidel.) is a town in Grodno District, Grodno Region, Belarus. It is located 31 kilometres (19 mi) east from Grodno. As of 2025, it has a population of 9,667.

== History ==
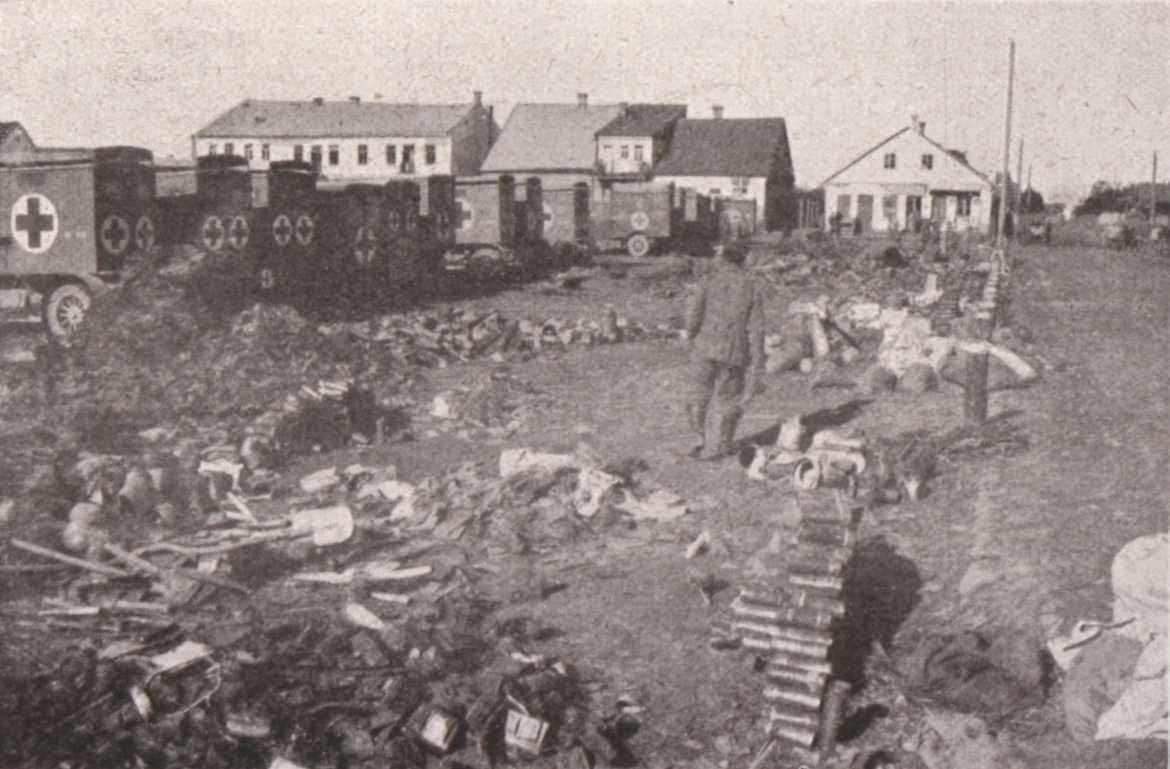
German occupying forces in Skidel during World War I

Within the Grand Duchy of Lithuania, Skidzyel’ was part of Trakai Voivodeship. In 1795, the town was acquired by the Russian Empire as a result of the Third Partition of Poland.

From 1921 until 1939, Skidzyel’ was part of the Białystok Voivodeship in the Second Polish Republic. In the 1921 Polish census, 68.7% people declared Jewish nationality, 17.3% people declared Polish nationality, and 12.3% declared Belarusian nationality. Skidziel is sometimes referred to as a former shtetl.

On 18 September 1939, in the course of the Soviet invasion of Poland, Skidzyel’ was the site of a pro-Soviet communist revolt against the Polish government leading to massacre of ethnic Poles by killing squads deployed by delegalized Communist Party of Western Belarus, armed with the smuggled Soviet guns soon before the invasion. The event is referred to by historians as the Skidel revolt. On 19 September, a unit of the Polish Army restored Polish control in Skidzyel’, but the next day, 20 September, the town was occupied by the Red Army and, on 14 November 1939, incorporated into the Byelorussian SSR.

From 27 June 1941 until 14 July 1944, Skidzyel’ was occupied by Nazi Germany and administered as a part of Bezirk Bialystok. Small shootings of Jews in the forest close to the city were frequent. The ghetto, where they were kept as prisoners, was liquidated on November 2, 1942. The Jews were taken to nearby Kolbassino (Polish: Kiełbasin) Sammellager transit camp to the south, packed with Jews of the Grodno Ghetto. At this time, they were 22,000 to 28,000 people in the camp. From there, they were sent aboard Holocaust trains to Auschwitz extermination camp.

After World War II, the Grodno headquarters of the Communist Party of the Soviet Union was located in Skidal until the collapse of the Soviet Union in 1991.

== Gallery ==
Points of interest

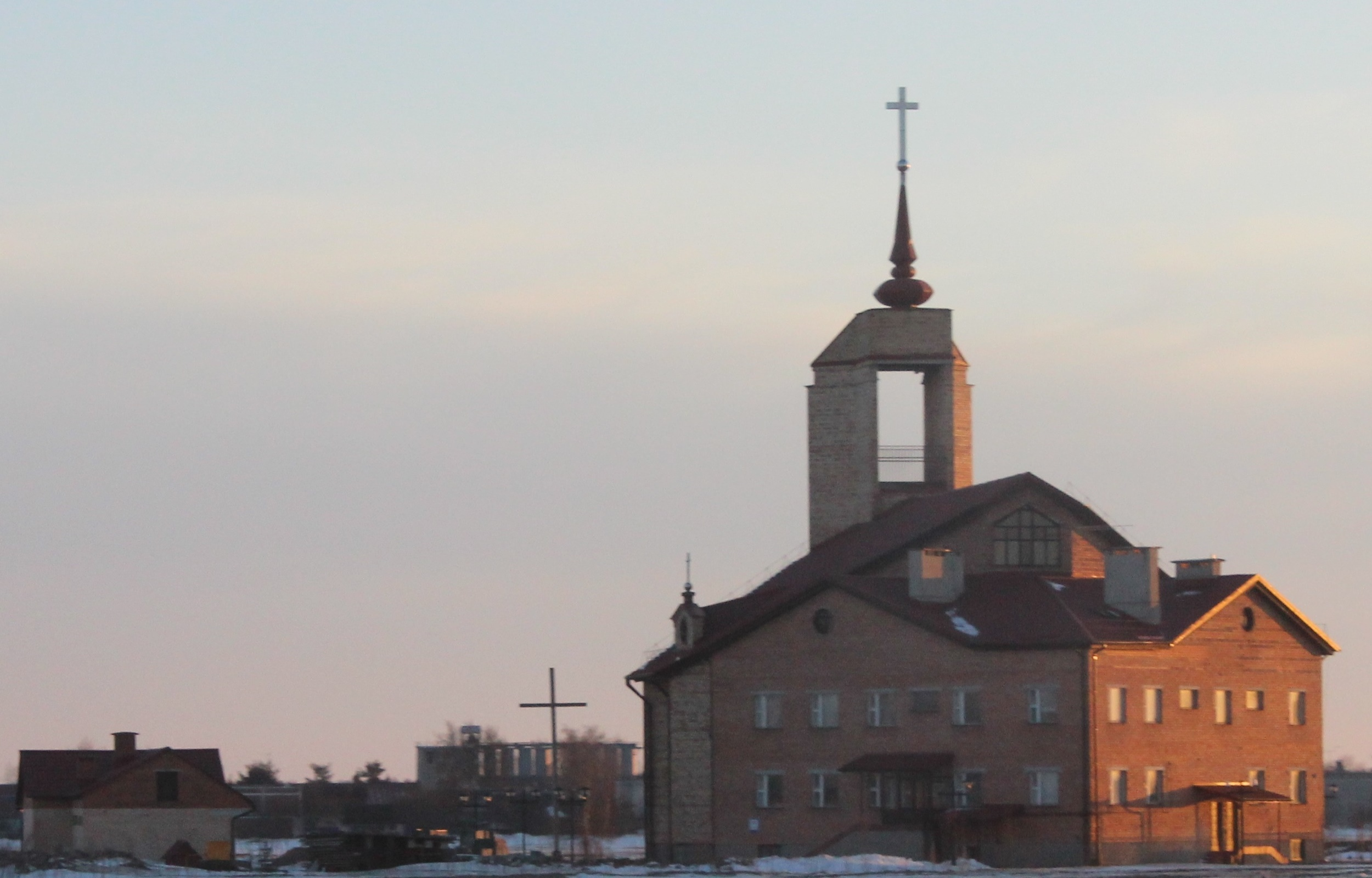
St. Joseph's Catholic Church in Skidzyel

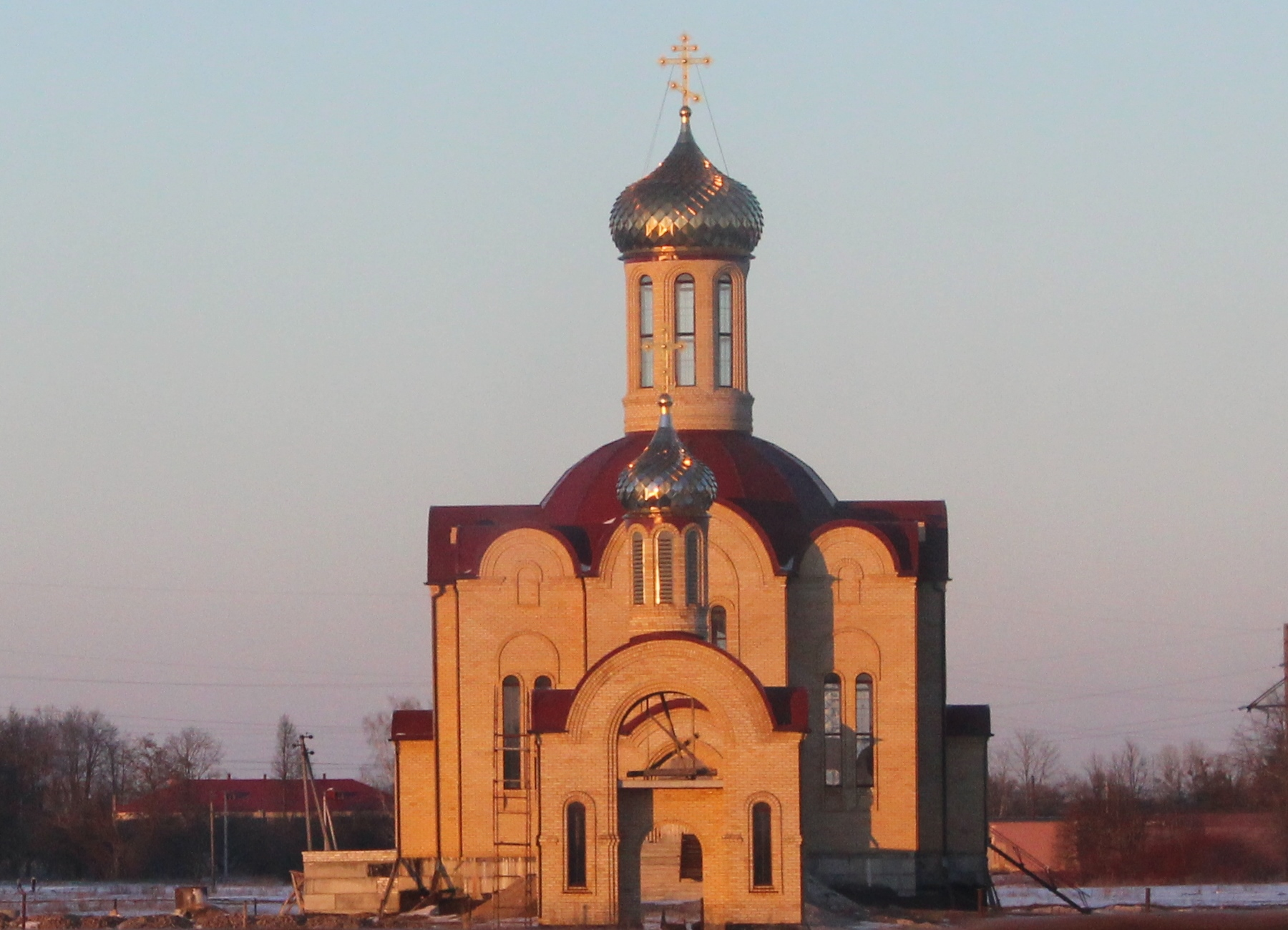
Church of New martyrs and Confessors

== Sources ==
- Marek Wierzbicki, Powstanie skidelskie 1939 r., Białoruskie Zeszyty Historyczne nr 7, Białystok, 1997
