= Budziska, Gołdap County =

Budziska
- Village
- Location within Poland
- Coordinates: 54°10′N 22°6′E
- Country: Poland
- Voivodeship: Warmian-Masurian
- County: Gołdap
- Gmina: Banie Mazurskie

Budziska [buˈd͡ʑiska] is a village in the administrative district of Gmina Banie Mazurskie, within Gołdap County, Warmian-Masurian Voivodeship, in northern Poland, close to the border with the Kaliningrad Oblast of Russia.
