= Sąkieły Małe =

- Village
- Location within Poland
- Coordinates: 54°19′N 21°55′E
- Country: Poland
- Voivodeship: Warmian-Masurian
- County: Węgorzewo
- Gmina: Budry

Sąkieły Małe [sɔnˈkʲɛwɨ ˈmawɛ] (German: Klein Sunkeln) is a village in the administrative district of Gmina Budry, within Węgorzewo County, Warmian-Masurian Voivodeship, in northern Poland, close to the border with the Kaliningrad Oblast of Russia.

== History ==
It was ceded to Poland after World War II.
