= Olszewo Węgorzewskie =

- Village
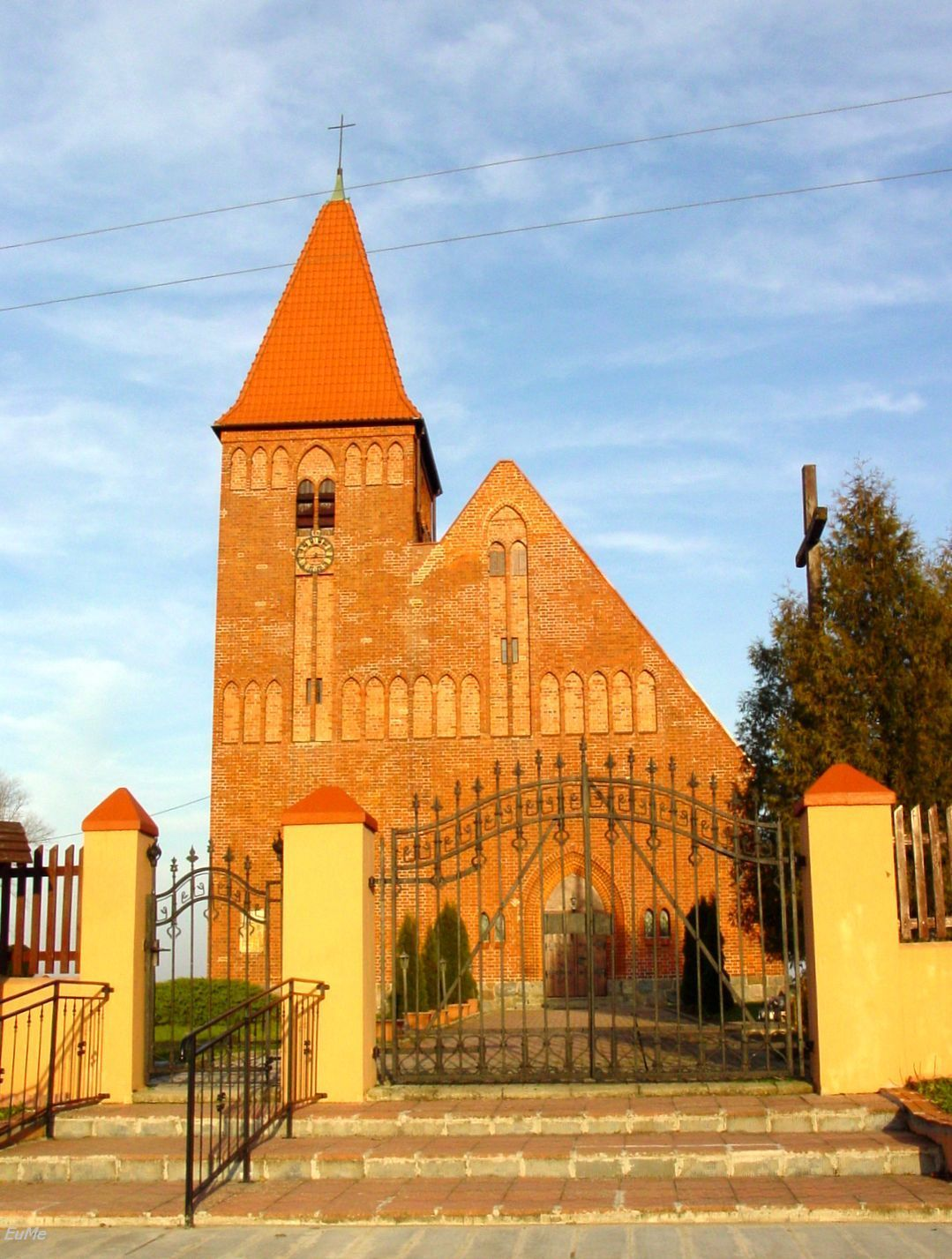
- Exaltation of the Holy Cross church in Olszewo Węgorzewskie

- Location within Poland
- Coordinates: 54°18′N 21°45′E
- Country: Poland
- Voivodeship: Warmian-Masurian
- County: Węgorzewo
- Gmina: Budry
- Founded: 1562
- Founder: Maciej Olszewski
- Time zone: UTC+1 (CET)
  - Summer (DST): UTC+2 (CEST)
- Vehicle registration: NWE

Olszewo Węgorzewskie [ɔlˈʂɛvɔ vɛnɡɔˈʐɛfskʲɛ] (German: Olschöwen, from 1938 to 1945 Kanitz) is a village in the administrative district of Gmina Budry, within Węgorzewo County, Warmian-Masurian Voivodeship, in northern Poland, close to the border with the Kaliningrad Oblast of Russia. It is located in Masuria.

Olszewo was founded in 1562 by Maciej Olszewski.
