= Nowiny, Gołdap County =

Nowiny
- Village
- Location within Poland
- Coordinates: 54°11′12″N 22°08′11″E
- Country: Poland
- Voivodeship: Warmian-Masurian
- County: Gołdap
- Gmina: Banie Mazurskie

Nowiny [nɔˈvinɨ] is a village in the administrative district of Gmina Banie Mazurskie, within Gołdap County, Warmian-Masurian Voivodeship, in northern Poland, close to the border with the Kaliningrad Oblast of Russia.
