= Więcki, Warmian-Masurian Voivodeship =

Więcki
- Village
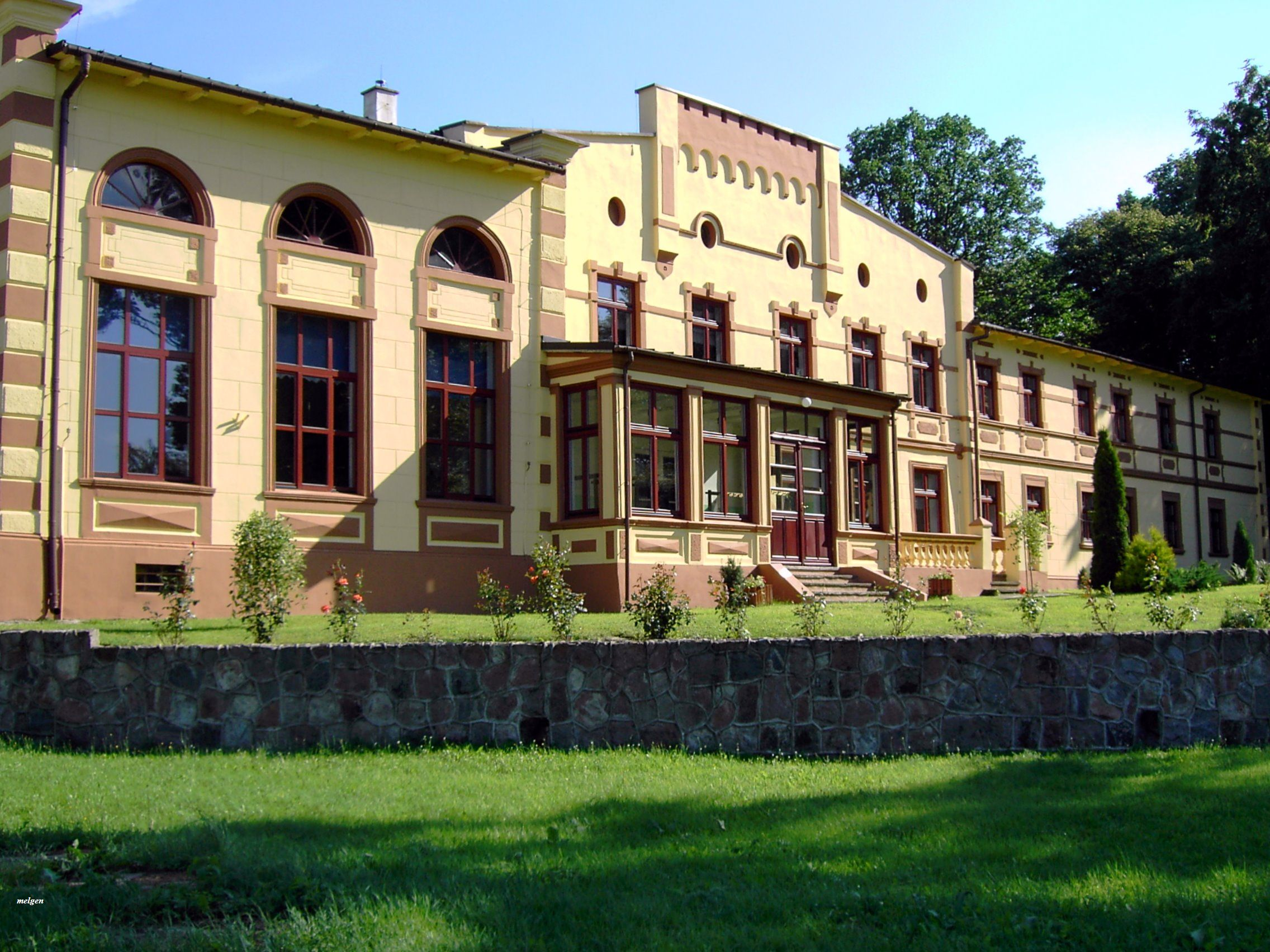
- School in Więcki

- Location within Poland
- Coordinates: 54°15′35″N 21°50′34″E
- Country: Poland
- Voivodeship: Warmian-Masurian
- County: Węgorzewo
- Gmina: Budry
- Founded: 1562
- Time zone: UTC+1 (CET)
  - Summer (DST): UTC+2 (CEST)
- Vehicle registration: NWE

Więcki [ˈvjɛnt͡ski] is a village in the administrative district of Gmina Budry, within Węgorzewo County, Warmian-Masurian Voivodeship, in northern Poland, close to the border with the Kaliningrad Oblast of Russia.

The village was founded in 1562. It was known in Polish as Więcki and Więckowice.
