= Dowiaty =

- Village
- Location within Poland
- Coordinates: 54°14′52″N 21°50′45″E
- Country: Poland
- Voivodeship: Warmian-Masurian
- County: Węgorzewo
- Gmina: Budry
- Population: 50

Dowiaty [dɔˈvjatɨ] (German: Dowiaten) is a village in the administrative district of Gmina Budry, within Węgorzewo County, Warmian-Masurian Voivodeship, in northern Poland, close to the border with the Kaliningrad Oblast of Russia.

The village has a population of 50.
