= Wężówko =

- Village
- Location within Poland
- Coordinates: 54°18′N 21°46′E
- Country: Poland
- Voivodeship: Warmian-Masurian
- County: Węgorzewo
- Gmina: Budry

Wężówko [vɛ̃ˈʐufkɔ] (German: Wensowken, 1938–1945 Wensen) is a village in the administrative district of Gmina Budry, within Węgorzewo County, Warmian-Masurian Voivodeship, in northern Poland, close to the border with the Kaliningrad Oblast of Russia.
