= Maryszki =

- Settlement
- Location within Poland
- Coordinates: 54°19′30″N 21°45′27″E
- Country: Poland
- Voivodeship: Warmian-Masurian
- County: Węgorzewo
- Gmina: Budry

Maryszki [maˈrɨʂki] (German: Marienwalde) is a settlement in the administrative district of Gmina Budry, within Węgorzewo County, Warmian-Masurian Voivodeship, in northern Poland, close to the border with the Kaliningrad Oblast of Russia.
