= Grądy Węgorzewskie =

- Village
- Location within Poland
- Coordinates: 54°14′46″N 21°54′34″E
- Country: Poland
- Voivodeship: Warmian-Masurian
- County: Węgorzewo
- Gmina: Budry
- Founded: 1565
- Time zone: UTC+1 (CET)
  - Summer (DST): UTC+2 (CEST)
- Vehicle registration: NWE

Grądy Węgorzewskie [ˈɡrɔndɨ vɛnɡɔˈʐɛfskʲɛ] (German: Gronden) is a village in the administrative district of Gmina Budry, within Węgorzewo County, Warmian-Masurian Voivodeship, in northern Poland, close to the border with the Kaliningrad Oblast of Russia. It is located in Masuria.

Grądy was founded in 1565.
