= Piotrówko =

- Village
- Location within Poland
- Coordinates: 54°16′34″N 21°51′8″E
- Country: Poland
- Voivodeship: Warmian-Masurian
- County: Węgorzewo
- Gmina: Budry
- Population: 50

Piotrówko [pjɔˈtrufkɔ] (German: Petersberg) is a village in the administrative district of Gmina Budry, within Węgorzewo County, Warmian-Masurian Voivodeship, in northern Poland, close to the border with the Kaliningrad Oblast of Russia.

The village has a population of 50.
