= Piłaki Małe =

- Village
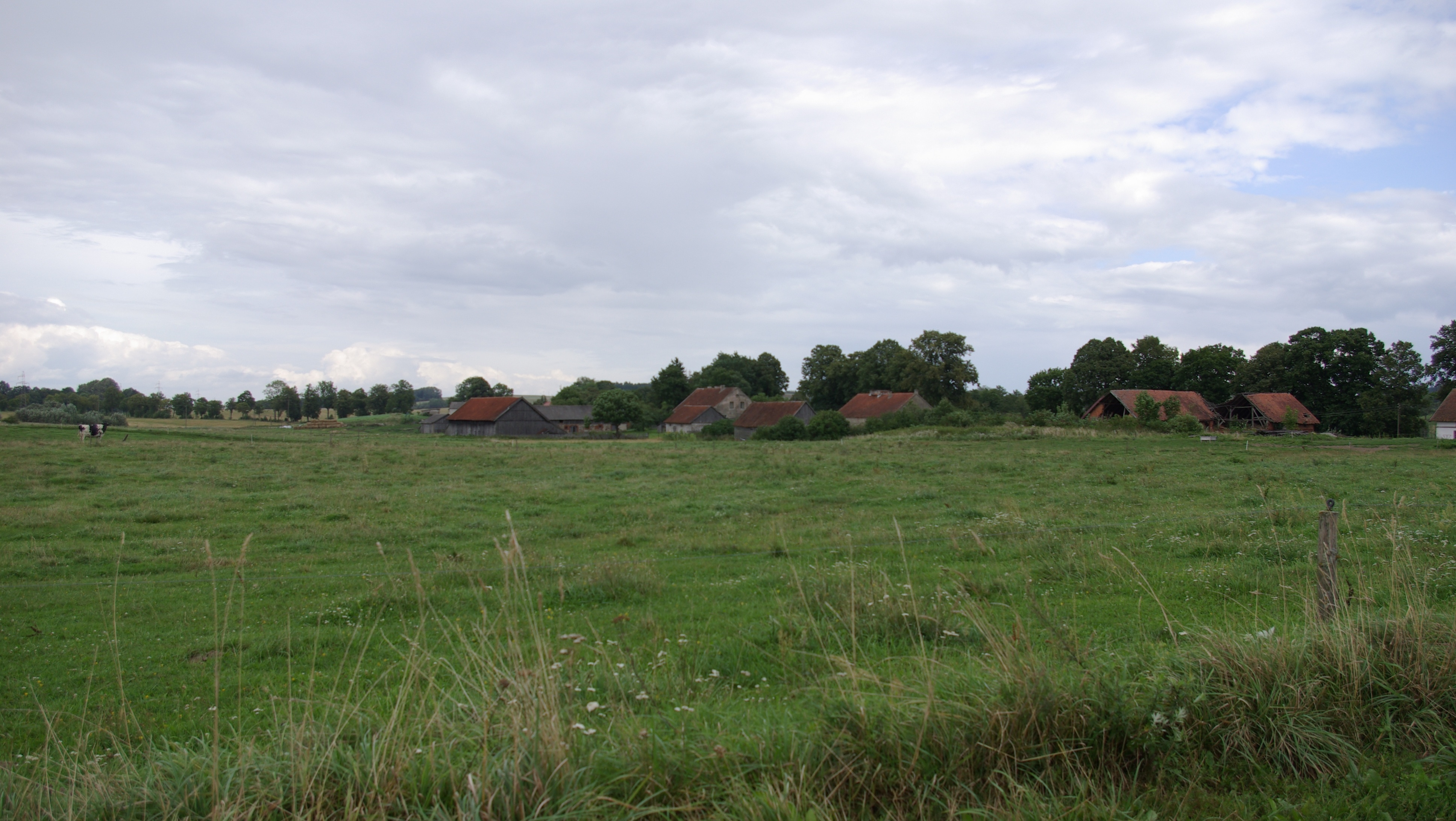

- Location within Poland
- Coordinates: 54°13′N 21°57′E
- Country: Poland
- Voivodeship: Warmian-Masurian
- County: Węgorzewo
- Gmina: Budry
- Founded: 1553
- Time zone: UTC+1 (CET)
  - Summer (DST): UTC+2 (CEST)
- Vehicle registration: NWE

Piłaki Małe [piˈwaki ˈmawɛ] (German: Klein Pillacken, 1923-1945 Lindenwiese) is a village in the administrative district of Gmina Budry, within Węgorzewo County, Warmian-Masurian Voivodeship, in northern Poland, close to the border with the Kaliningrad Oblast of Russia. It is located in Masuria.

Piłaki Małe was established in 1553 by Maciej, who bought land to establish the village.
