= Gumbinnen (region) =

Region of East Prussia (1808–1945)

Regierungsbezirk Gumbinnen (German pronunciation: [gʊmˈbɪnən]) was a Regierungsbezirk, or government region, of the Prussian province of East Prussia from 1808 until 1945. The regional capital was Gumbinnen (Gusev).

Regierungsbezirk Gumbinnen (blue) in East Prussia, after 1905

== History ==
In 1808 during the Napoleonic Wars, East Prussia was divided into the Regierungsbezirke of Gumbinnen, comprising the eastern parts of the former Duchy of Prussia, and Königsberg. On November 1, 1905, the southern districts of the two regions were separated to create Regierungsbezirk Allenstein. The districts of Johannisburg, Lötzen, Lyck and Sensburg were transferred from Regierungsbezirk Gumbinnen to Regierungsbezirk Allenstein.

Regierungsbezirk Gumbinnen (blue) in East Prussia, before 1905

Regierungsbezirk Gumbinnen was dissolved in 1945 following the occupation of East Prussia by the Red Army and the collapse of Prussian civil administration. Its territory was subsequently incorporated into the Soviet Union after World War II according to the resolutions at the Potsdam Conference. It is now part of Kaliningrad.

== Districts in 1937 ==
As of December 31, 1937

=== Urban districts ===
1. Insterburg
2. Tilsit

=== Rural districts ===
1. Angerburg (Węgorzewo today, Węgobork between 1945 and 1946)
2. Darkehmen (Ozyorsk today)
3. Goldap (Gołdap today)
4. Gumbinnen (Gusevsky District today)
5. Insterburg (Chernyakhovsk today)
6. Niederung (seat: Heinrichswalde) (Slavsk today)
7. Pillkallen (Dobrovolsk today, Schlossberg between 1938 and 1945)
8. Stallupönen (Nesterov today, Ebenrode between 1938 and 1945)
9. Tilsit-Ragnit (Sovetsk-Neman today) (seat: Tilsit)
10. Treuburg (Name of district was Oletzko before 1933) (Seat: Marggrabowa or Oletzko between 1560-1928 and renamed as Treuburg in 1928, Olecko today)

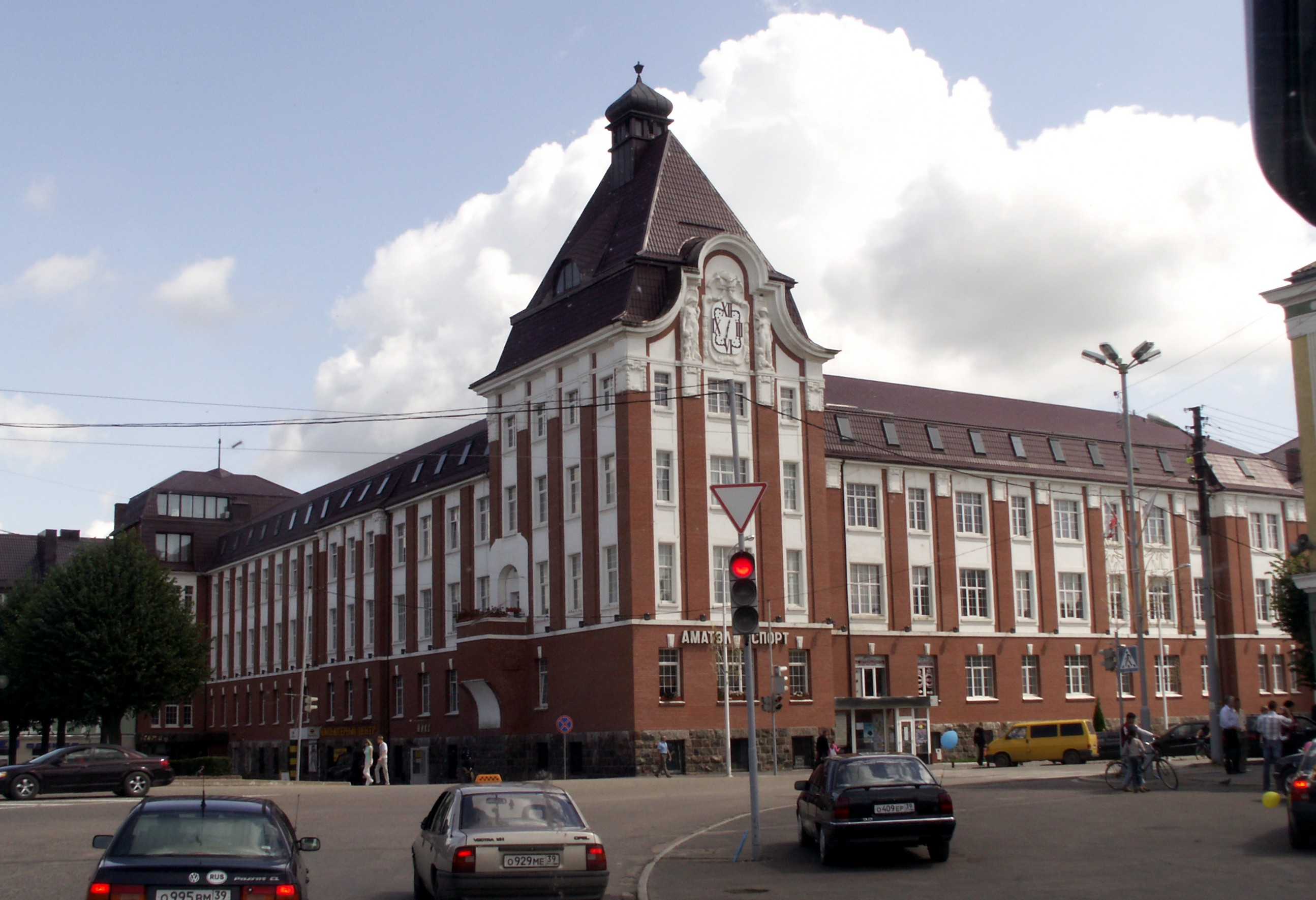
Former Regional Government (Bezirksregierung) or Government Building (Regierung[spräsidium]), now office building in Gusev, 2009

== Districts in 1945 ==
As of January 1, 1945:

=== Urban districts ===
1. Memel
2. Insterburg
3. Tilsit

=== Rural districts ===
1. Darkehmen
2. Angerburg
3. Ebenrode
4. Elchniederung (seat: Heinrichswalde)
5. Goldap
6. Gumbinnen
7. Heydekrug (Šilutė today)
8. Insterburg
9. Memel (Klaipėda today)
10. Schloßberg (Ostpr.)
11. Sudauen (Suwałki today)
12. Tilsit-Ragnit (seat: Tilsit)
13. Treuburg
