= Zakałcze Wielkie =

- Village
- Location within Poland
- Coordinates: 54°15′17″N 21°59′00″E
- Country: Poland
- Voivodeship: Warmian-Masurian
- County: Gołdap
- Gmina: Banie Mazurskie

Zakałcze Wielkie [zaˈkau̯t͡ʂɛ ˈvjɛlkʲɛ] is a village in the administrative district of Gmina Banie Mazurskie, within Gołdap County, Warmian-Masurian Voivodeship, in northern Poland, close to the border with the Kaliningrad Oblast of Russia.
