= Kiermuszyny Wielkie =

- Settlement
- Location within Poland
- Coordinates: 54°18′19″N 22°03′43″E
- Country: Poland
- Voivodeship: Warmian-Masurian
- County: Gołdap
- Gmina: Banie Mazurskie

Kiermuszyny Wielkie [kʲɛrmuˈʂɨnɨ ˈvjɛlkʲɛ] is an abandoned settlement in the administrative district of Gmina Banie Mazurskie, within Gołdap County, Warmian-Masurian Voivodeship, in northern Poland, close to the border with the Kaliningrad Oblast of Russia.
