= Sobiechy =

- Village
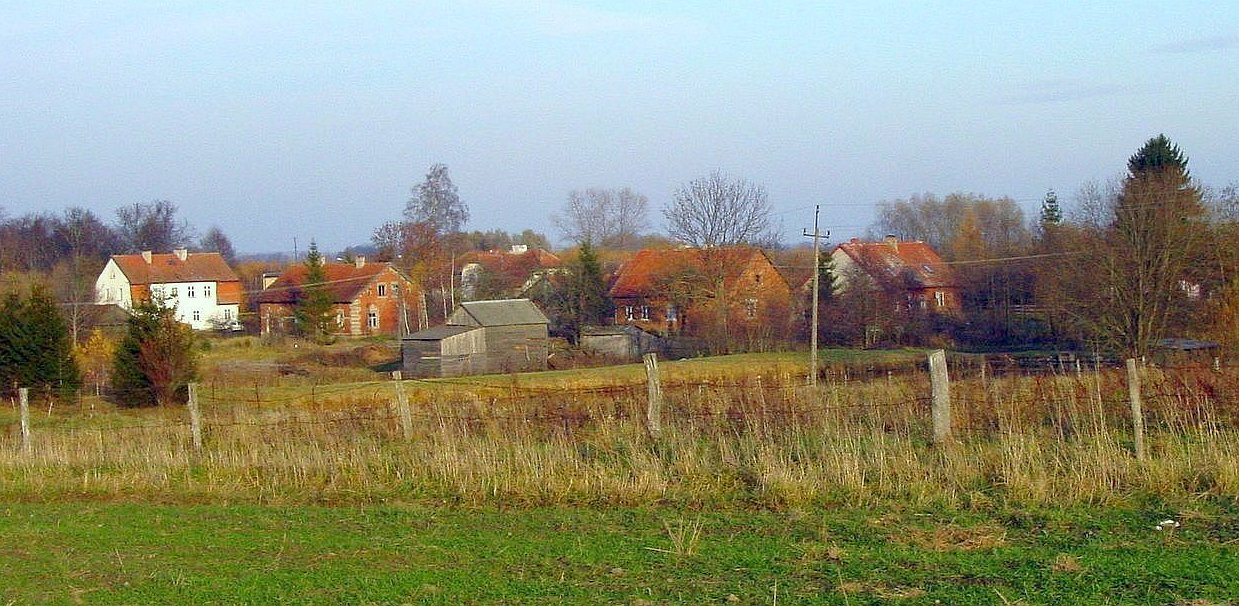

- Location within Poland
- Coordinates: 54°18′N 21°49′E
- Country: Poland
- Voivodeship: Warmian-Masurian
- County: Węgorzewo
- Gmina: Budry
- Founded: 1562
- Time zone: UTC+1 (CET)
  - Summer (DST): UTC+2 (CEST)
- Vehicle registration: NWE

Sobiechy [sɔˈbjɛxɨ] (German: Sobiechen, from 1938-45 Salpen) is a village in the administrative district of Gmina Budry, within Węgorzewo County, Warmian-Masurian Voivodeship, in northern Poland, close to the border with the Kaliningrad Oblast of Russia.

Sobiechy was established by Polish people in 1562.
