= Mniszki, Warmian-Masurian Voivodeship =

Mniszki
- Settlement
- Location within Poland
- Coordinates: 54°19′12″N 21°46′24″E
- Country: Poland
- Voivodeship: Warmian-Masurian
- County: Węgorzewo
- Gmina: Budry

Mniszki [ˈmniʂki] (German: Nonnenberg) is a settlement in the administrative district of Gmina Budry, within Węgorzewo County, Warmian-Masurian Voivodeship, in northern Poland, close to the border with the Kaliningrad Oblast of Russia.
