= Węgorapa, Warmian-Masurian Voivodeship =

Węgorapa
- Village
- Location within Poland
- Coordinates: 54°19′40″N 21°59′06″E
- Country: Poland
- Voivodeship: Warmian-Masurian
- County: Gołdap
- Gmina: Banie Mazurskie
- Time zone: UTC+1 (CET)
  - Summer (DST): UTC+2 (CEST)
- Vehicle registration: NGO

Węgorapa [vɛnɡɔˈrapa] is a village in the administrative district of Gmina Banie Mazurskie, within Gołdap County, Warmian-Masurian Voivodeship, in northern Poland, close to the border with the Kaliningrad Oblast of Russia.
