= Koźlak, Warmian-Masurian Voivodeship =

Koźlak
- Village
- Location within Poland
- Coordinates: 54°13′7″N 21°57′36″E
- Country: Poland
- Voivodeship: Warmian-Masurian
- County: Węgorzewo
- Gmina: Budry

Koźlak [ˈkɔʑlak] (German: Wilhelmshöh) is a village in the administrative district of Gmina Budry, within Węgorzewo County, Warmian-Masurian Voivodeship, in northern Poland, close to the border with the Kaliningrad Oblast of Russia.
