= Droglewo =

- Settlement
- Location within Poland
- Coordinates: 54°15′20″N 21°49′36″E
- Country: Poland
- Voivodeship: Warmian-Masurian
- County: Węgorzewo
- Gmina: Budry
- Time zone: UTC+01:00 (CET)
  - Summer (DST): UTC+02:00 (CEST)

Droglewo [drɔˈɡlɛvɔ] (German: Karlshof) is a settlement in the administrative district of Gmina Budry, within Węgorzewo County, Warmian-Masurian Voivodeship, in northern Poland, close to the border with the Kaliningrad Oblast of Russia.
