= Żabin Rybacki =

- Village
- Location within Poland
- Coordinates: 54°19′48″N 22°03′30″E
- Country: Poland
- Voivodeship: Warmian-Masurian
- County: Gołdap
- Gmina: Banie Mazurskie

Żabin Rybacki [ˈʐabin rɨˈbat͡ski] is a village in the administrative district of Gmina Banie Mazurskie, within Gołdap County, Warmian-Masurian Voivodeship, in northern Poland, 500 metres (547 yd) from the border with the Kaliningrad Oblast of Russia.
