= Śluza, Warmian-Masurian Voivodeship =

Śluza
- Village
- Location within Poland
- Coordinates: 54°15′43″N 21°58′53″E
- Country: Poland
- Voivodeship: Warmian-Masurian
- County: Gołdap
- Gmina: Banie Mazurskie

Śluza [ˈɕluza] is a village in the administrative district of Gmina Banie Mazurskie, within Gołdap County, Warmian-Masurian Voivodeship, in northern Poland, close to the border with the Kaliningrad Oblast of Russia.
