= Skalisze =

- Village
- Location within Poland
- Coordinates: 54°19′N 21°57′E
- Country: Poland
- Voivodeship: Warmian-Masurian
- County: Węgorzewo
- Gmina: Budry

Skalisze [skaˈliʂɛ] (German: Skallischen Forst, Anteil Kreis Angerburg) is a village in the administrative district of Gmina Budry, within Węgorzewo County, Warmian-Masurian Voivodeship, in northern Poland, close to the border with the Kaliningrad Oblast of Russia.
