= Grodzisko, Gołdap County =

Grodzisko
- Village
- Location within Poland
- Coordinates: 54°11′39″N 22°01′13″E
- Country: Poland
- Voivodeship: Warmian-Masurian
- County: Gołdap
- Gmina: Banie Mazurskie
- Founded: 1566
- Founder: Wojtek Skorupczyk

Population
  - Total: 250
- Time zone: UTC+1 (CET)
  - Summer (DST): UTC+2 (CEST)
- Area code: (+48) 87
- Vehicle registration: NGO

Grodzisko [ɡrɔˈd͡ʑiskɔ] is a village in the administrative district of Gmina Banie Mazurskie, within Gołdap County, Warmian-Masurian Voivodeship, in north-eastern Poland, close to the border with the Kaliningrad Oblast of Russia.

Grodzisko was founded in 1566 by Wojtek Skorupczyk, who bought land to establish the village.
