= Gmina Budry =

Gmina Budry Budry Commune
- Gmina
- Coat of arms
- Interactive map of Gmina Budry
- Coordinates (Budry): 54°15′N 21°53′E
- Country: Poland
- Voivodeship: Warmian-Masurian
- County: Węgorzewo
- Seat: Budry

Area
  - Total: 175.02 km^{2} (67.58 sq mi)

Population (2006)
  - Total: 3,051
  - Density: 17.43/km^{2} (45.15/sq mi)
- Website: http://www.budry.pl

Gmina Budry is a rural gmina (administrative district) in Węgorzewo County, Warmian-Masurian Voivodeship, in northern Poland, on the border with Russia. Its seat is the village of Budry, which lies approximately 10 kilometres (6 mi) north-east of Węgorzewo and 105 km (65 mi) north-east of the regional capital Olsztyn.

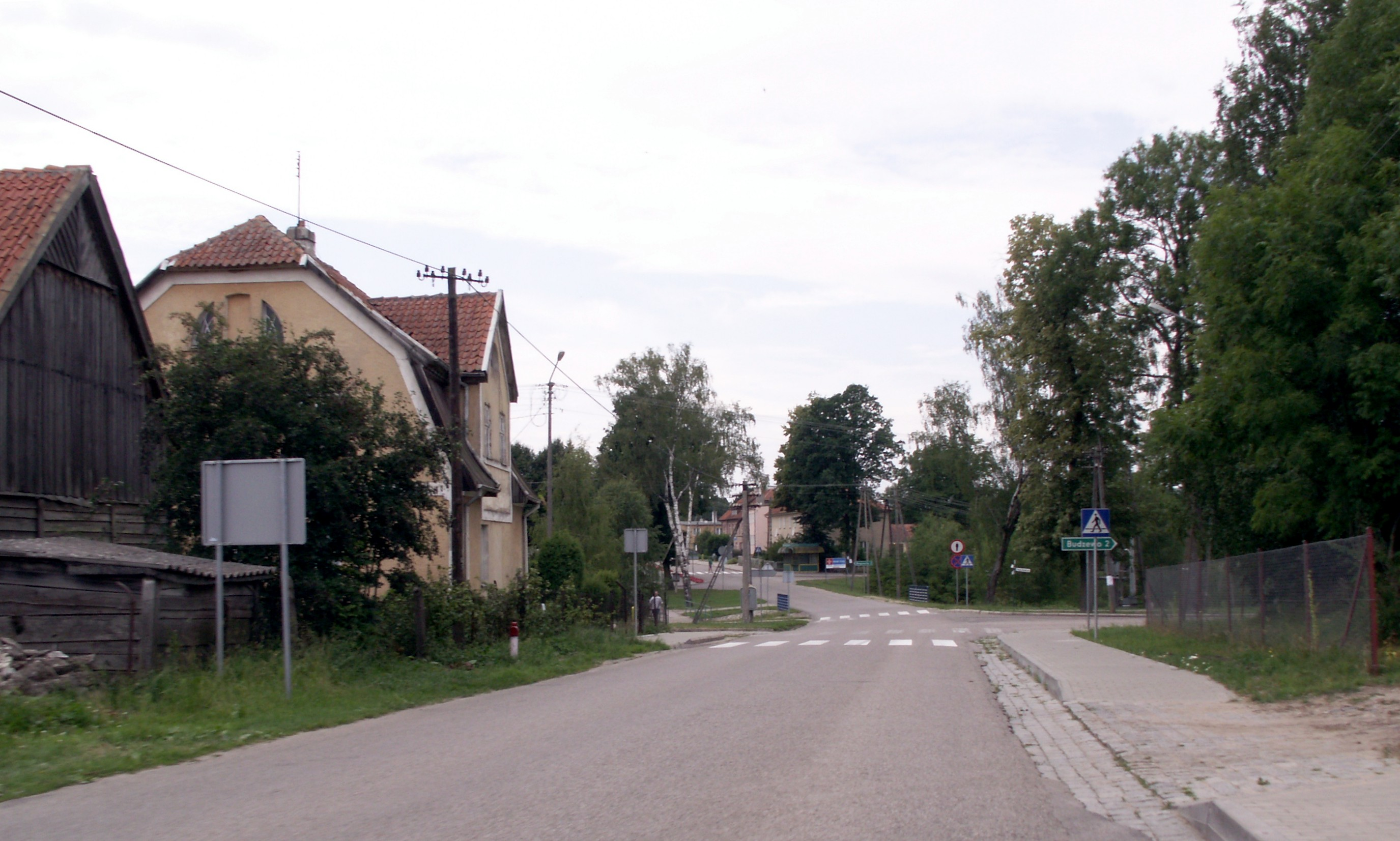

The gmina covers an area of 175.02 square kilometres (67.6 sq mi), and as of 2006 its total population is 3,051.

== Villages ==
Gmina Budry contains the villages and settlements of Bogumiły, Brzozówko, Budry, Budzewo, Dąbrówka, Dowiaty, Droglewo, Góry, Grądy Węgorzewskie, Koźlak, Maryszki, Mniszki, Ołownik, Ołownik PGR, Olszewo Węgorzewskie, Pawłowo, Pietrele, Piłaki Małe, Piotrówko, Pochwałki, Popioły, Sąkieły Małe, Skalisko, Skalisze, Sobiechy, Wężówko, Więcki, Wola, Wydutki, Zabrost and Zabrost Wielki.

== Neighbouring gminas ==
Gmina Budry is bordered by the gminas of Banie Mazurskie, Pozezdrze and Węgorzewo. It also borders Russia (Kaliningrad oblast).
