= Różanka-Dwór =

- Village
- Location within Poland
- Coordinates: 54°13′27″N 21°59′05″E
- Country: Poland
- Voivodeship: Warmian-Masurian
- County: Gołdap
- Gmina: Banie Mazurskie

Różanka-Dwór (Polish pronunciation: [ruˈʐaŋka ˈdvur]) is a village in the administrative district of Gmina Banie Mazurskie, within Gołdap County, Warmian-Masurian Voivodeship, in northern Poland, close to the border with the Kaliningrad Oblast of Russia.
