= Ołownik =

- Village
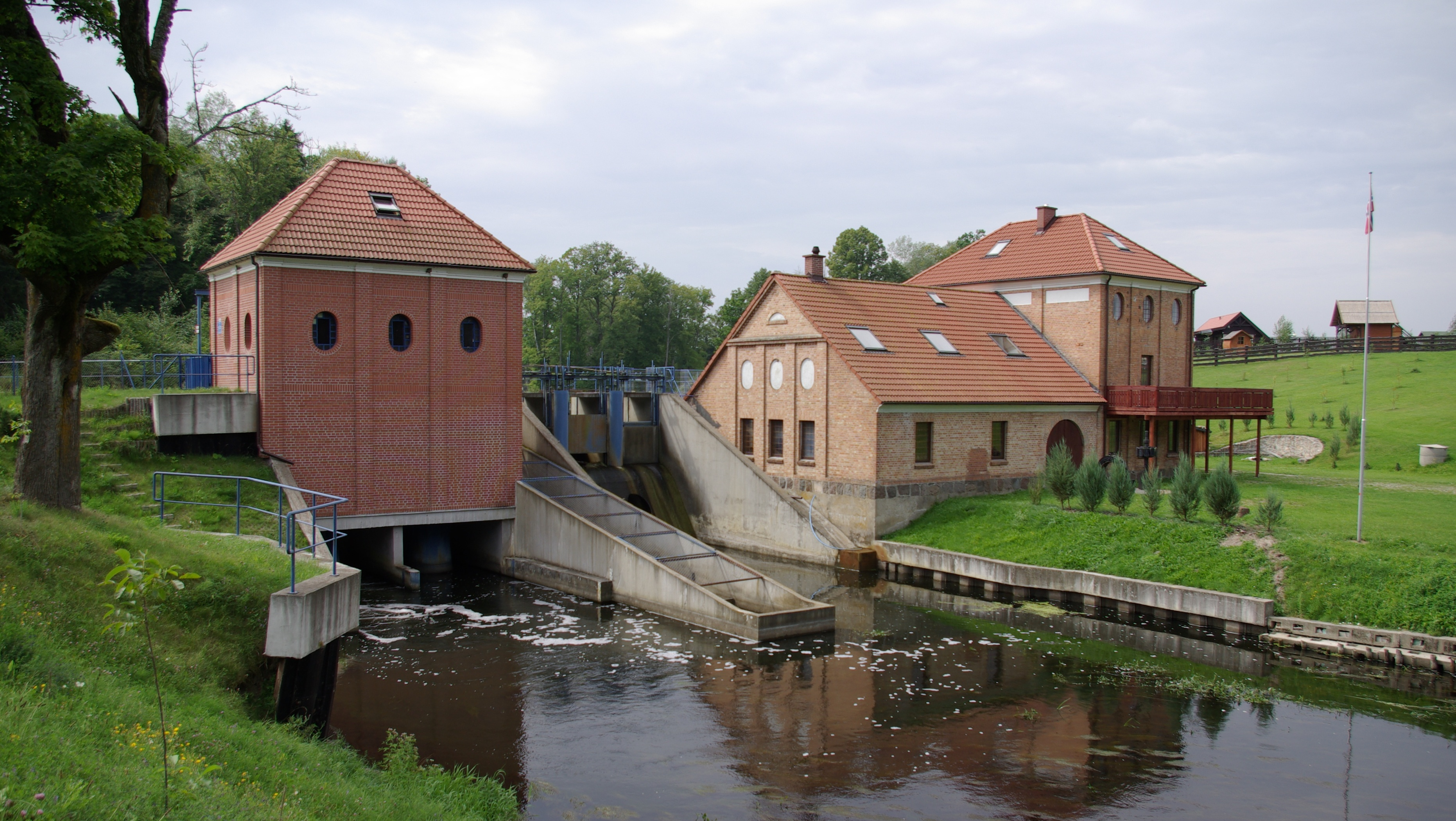
- Hydroelectric power plant in Ołownik

- Location within Poland
- Coordinates: 54°19′N 21°50′E
- Country: Poland
- Voivodeship: Warmian-Masurian
- County: Węgorzewo
- Gmina: Budry
- Vehicle registration: NWE

Ołownik [ɔˈwɔvnik] (Note: German: Launingken, from 1938-45 Sanden) is a village in the administrative district of Gmina Budry, within Węgorzewo County, Warmian-Masurian Voivodeship, in northern Poland, close to the border with the Kaliningrad Oblast of Russia.
