= Gmina Banie Mazurskie =

Gmina Banie Mazurskie Banie Mazurskie Commune
- Gmina
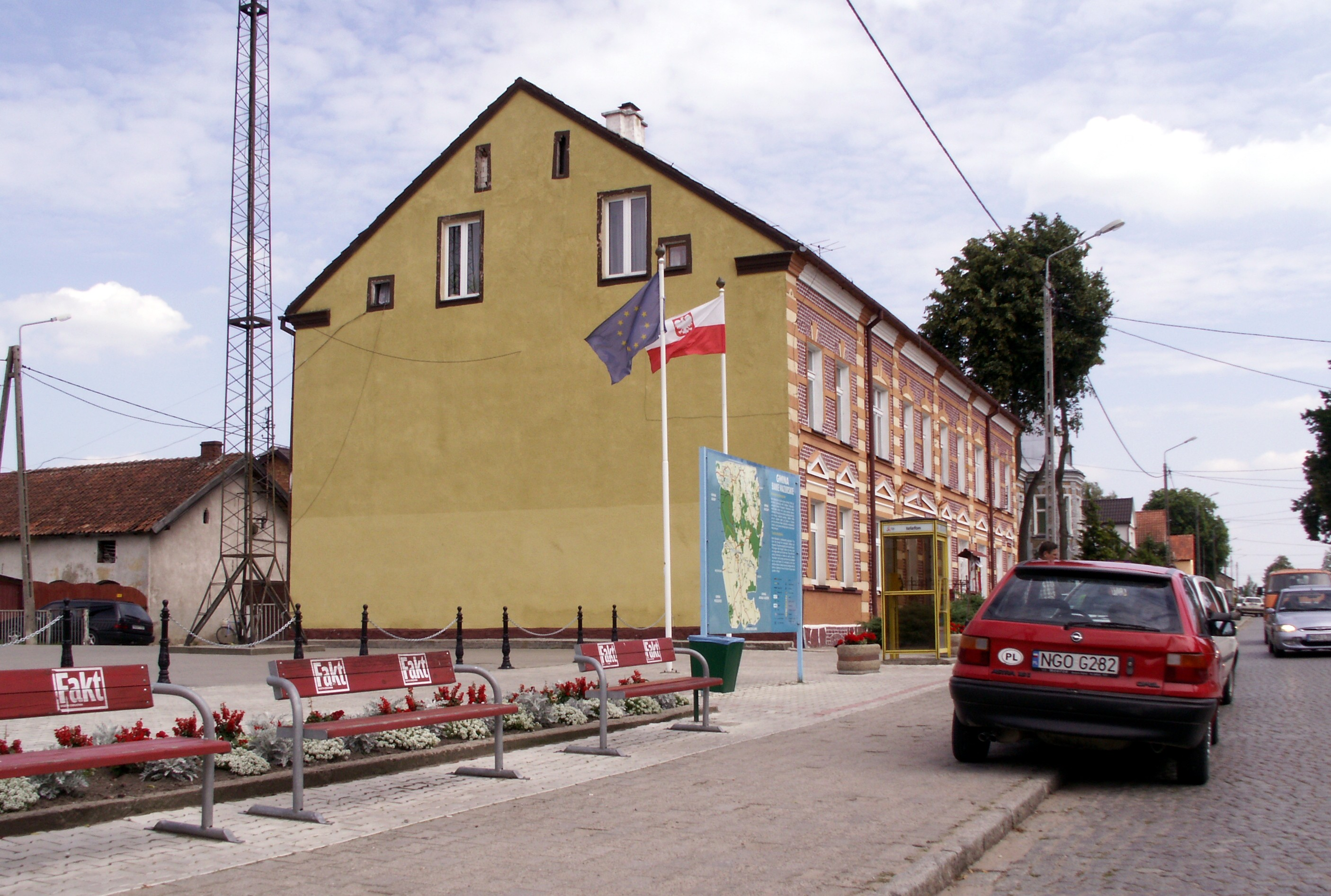
- Interactive map of Gmina Banie Mazurskie
- Coordinates (Banie Mazurskie): 54°14′18″N 22°2′21″E
- Country: Poland
- Voivodeship: Warmian-Masurian
- County: Gołdap
- Seat: Banie Mazurskie

Area
  - Total: 205.02 km^{2} (79.16 sq mi)

Population (2006)
  - Total: 3,920
  - Density: 19.1/km^{2} (49.5/sq mi)

Gmina Banie Mazurskie is a rural gmina (administrative district) in Gołdap County, Warmian-Masurian Voivodeship, in northern Poland, on the border with Russia. Its seat is the village of Banie Mazurskie, which lies approximately 20 kilometres (12 mi) south-west of Gołdap and 113 km (70 mi) north-east of the regional capital Olsztyn.

The gmina covers an area of 205.02 square kilometres (79.2 sq mi), and as of 2006 its total population is 3,920.

== Villages ==
Gmina Banie Mazurskie contains the villages and settlements of:

- Antomieszki
- Audyniszki
- Banie Mazurskie
- Borek
- Brożajcie
- Budziska
- Czupowo
- Dąbrówka Polska
- Dąbrówka Polska-Osada
- Grodzisko
- Grunajki
- Gryżewo
- Jagiele
- Jagoczany
- Jeglewo
- Kiermuszyny Wielkie
- Kierzki
- Klewiny
- Kruki
- Kulsze
- Liski
- Lisy
- Maciejowa Wola
- Miczuły
- Mieczkówka
- Mieczniki
- Mieduniszki Małe
- Mieduniszki Wielkie
- Nowiny
- Obszarniki
- Radkiejmy
- Rapa
- Rogale
- Różanka-Dwór
- Sapałówka
- Ściborki
- Skaliszkiejmy
- Śluza
- Stadnica
- Stare Gajdzie
- Stary Żabin
- Surminy
- Szarek
- Ustronie
- Węgorapa
- Widgiry
- Wólka
- Wróbel
- Żabin
- Żabin Graniczny
- Żabin Rybacki
- Zakałcze Wielkie
- Zapały
- Zawady
- Ziemianki
- Ziemiany

== Neighbouring gminas ==
Gmina Banie Mazurskie is bordered by the gminas of Budry, Gołdap, Kowale Oleckie, Kruklanki and Pozezdrze. It also borders Russia (Kaliningrad oblast).
