= Pochwałki =

- Village
- Location within Poland
- Coordinates: 54°18′54″N 21°47′47″E
- Country: Poland
- Voivodeship: Warmian-Masurian
- County: Węgorzewo
- Gmina: Budry

Pochwałki [pɔxˈfau̯ki] (German: Friedrichsfelde, from 1938 to 1945 Sandenfelde) is a village in the administrative district of Gmina Budry, within Węgorzewo County, Warmian-Masurian Voivodeship, in northern Poland, close to the border with the Kaliningrad Oblast of Russia.
