= Czupowo =

- Village
- Location within Poland
- Coordinates: 54°16′02″N 22°03′00″E
- Country: Poland
- Voivodeship: Warmian-Masurian
- County: Gołdap
- Gmina: Banie Mazurskie

Czupowo [t͡ʂuˈpɔvɔ] is a village in the administrative district of Gmina Banie Mazurskie, within Gołdap County, Warmian-Masurian Voivodeship, in northern Poland, close to the border with the Kaliningrad Oblast of Russia.
