= Ziemiany, Warmian-Masurian Voivodeship =

Ziemiany
- Village
- Location within Poland
- Coordinates: 54°16′N 22°6′E
- Country: Poland
- Voivodeship: Warmian-Masurian
- County: Gołdap
- Gmina: Banie Mazurskie
- Population: 50

Ziemiany [ʑɛˈmjanɨ] is a village in the administrative district of Gmina Banie Mazurskie, within Gołdap County, Warmian-Masurian Voivodeship, in northern Poland, close to the border with the Kaliningrad Oblast of Russia.
