= Góry, Węgorzewo County =

Góry
- Village
- Location within Poland
- Coordinates: 54°19′N 21°44′E
- Country: Poland
- Voivodeship: Warmian-Masurian
- County: Węgorzewo
- Gmina: Budry
- Founded: 1548
- Founder: Jakub Bartnikowicz
- Time zone: UTC+1 (CET)
  - Summer (DST): UTC+2 (CEST)
- Vehicle registration: NWE

Góry [ˈɡurɨ] is a village in the administrative district of Gmina Budry, within Węgorzewo County, Warmian-Masurian Voivodeship, in northern Poland, close to the border with the Kaliningrad Oblast of Russia. It is located in the region of Masuria.

Góry was established in 1548 by Jakub Bartnikowicz, who bought land to establish the village.
