= Budry =

- Village
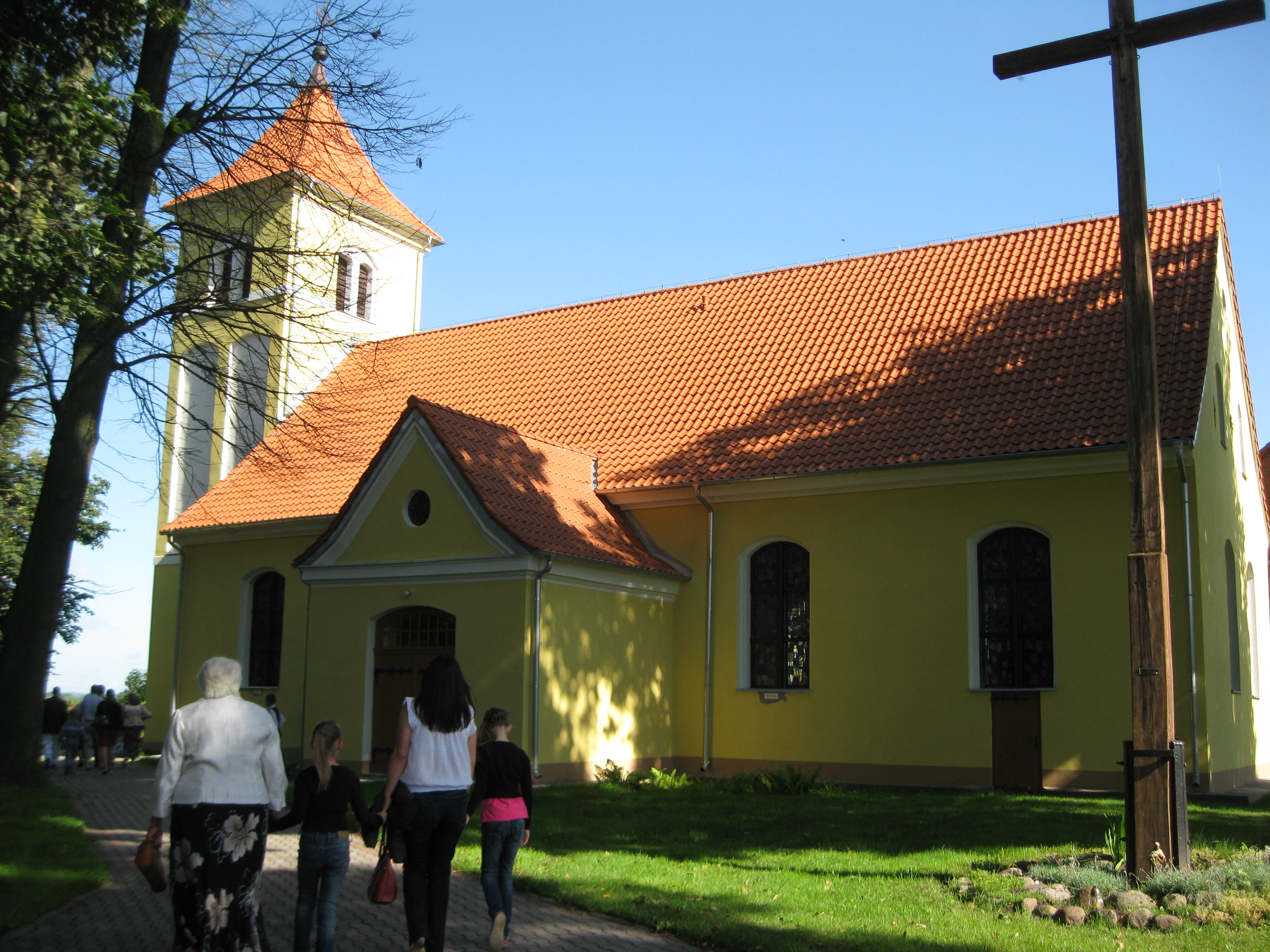
- Holy Trinity church in Budry

- Location within Poland
- Coordinates: 54°15′N 21°53′E
- Country: Poland
- Voivodeship: Warmian-Masurian
- County: Węgorzewo
- Gmina: Budry
- Founded: 1565

Population
  - Total: 420
- Time zone: UTC+1 (CET)
  - Summer (DST): UTC+2 (CEST)
- Vehicle registration: NWE

Budry [ˈbudrɨ] is a village in Węgorzewo County, Warmian-Masurian Voivodeship, in northern Poland, close to the border with the Kaliningrad Oblast of Russia. It is the seat of the gmina (administrative district) called Gmina Budry. It is located in the historic region of Masuria.

== History ==
Budry was founded in 1565.

In the late 19th century, the village had a population of 778, predominantly Polish by ethnicity, mostly employed in agriculture.
