= Banie Mazurskie =

- Village
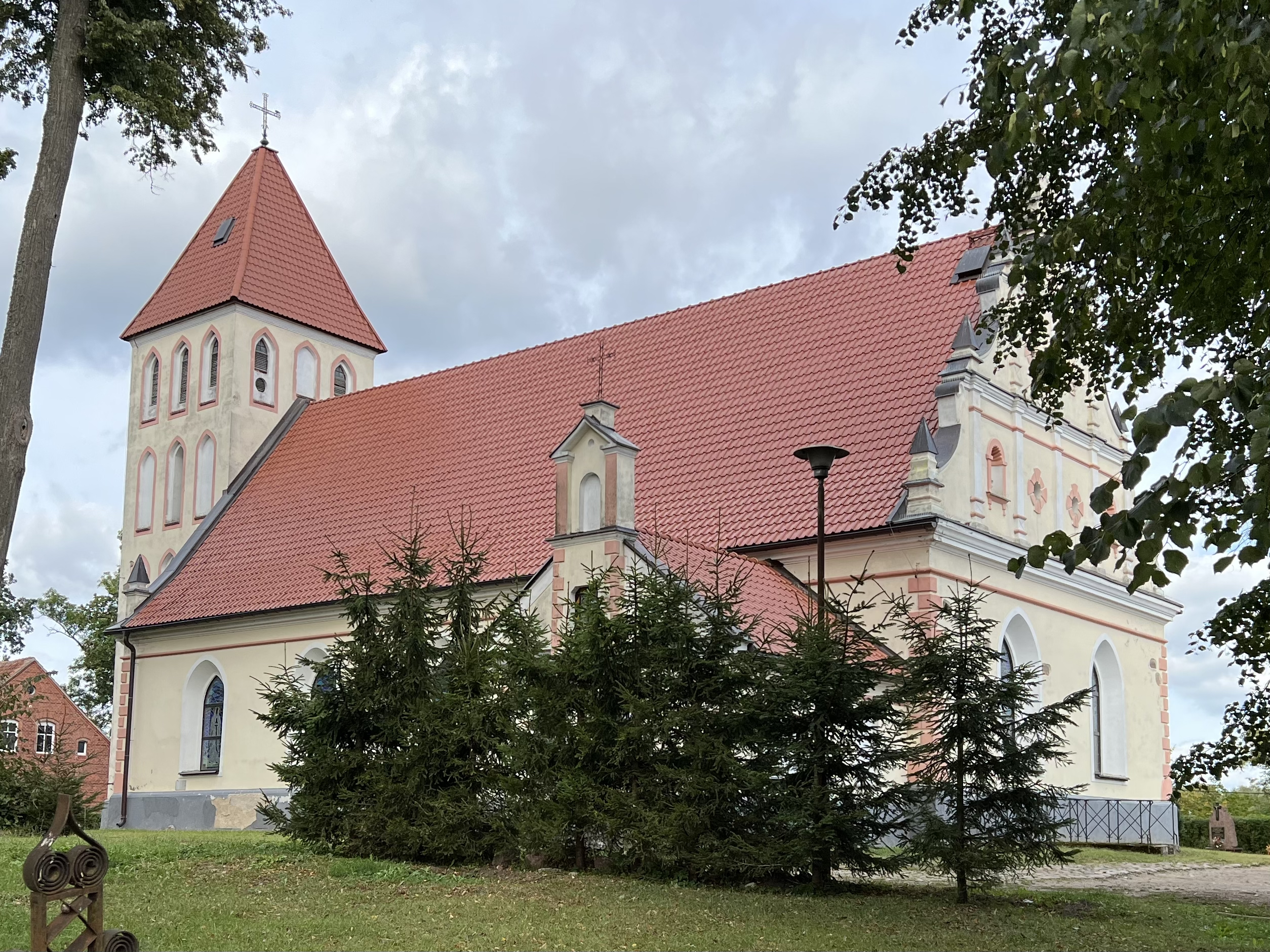
- Saint Anthony of Padua church in Banie Mazurskie

- Location within Poland
- Coordinates: 54°14′18″N 22°2′21″E
- Country: Poland
- Voivodeship: Warmian-Masurian
- County: Gołdap
- Gmina: Banie Mazurskie

Government
  - Mayor: Łukasz Kuliś
- Area: 205 km^{2} (79 sq mi)
- Population (2010): 3,770
  - Density: 18.4/km^{2} (47.6/sq mi)
- Postal code: 19-520
- Area Code: (+48) 87
- Vehicle registration: NGO

Banie Mazurskie ([ˈbaɲɛ maˈzurskʲɛ]) is a village in Gołdap County, Warmian-Masurian Voivodeship, in north-eastern Poland, close to the border with the Kaliningrad Oblast of Russia. It is the seat of the gmina (administrative district) called Gmina Banie Mazurskie.
