= Stary Żabin =

- Village
- Location within Poland
- Coordinates: 54°20′N 22°4′E
- Country: Poland
- Voivodeship: Warmian-Masurian
- County: Gołdap
- Gmina: Banie Mazurskie

Stary Żabin [ˈstarɨ ˈʐabin] is a village in the administrative district of Gmina Banie Mazurskie, within Gołdap County, Warmian-Masurian Voivodeship, in northern Poland, close to the border with the Kaliningrad Oblast of Russia.
