= Kreis Angerburg =

District of Prussia

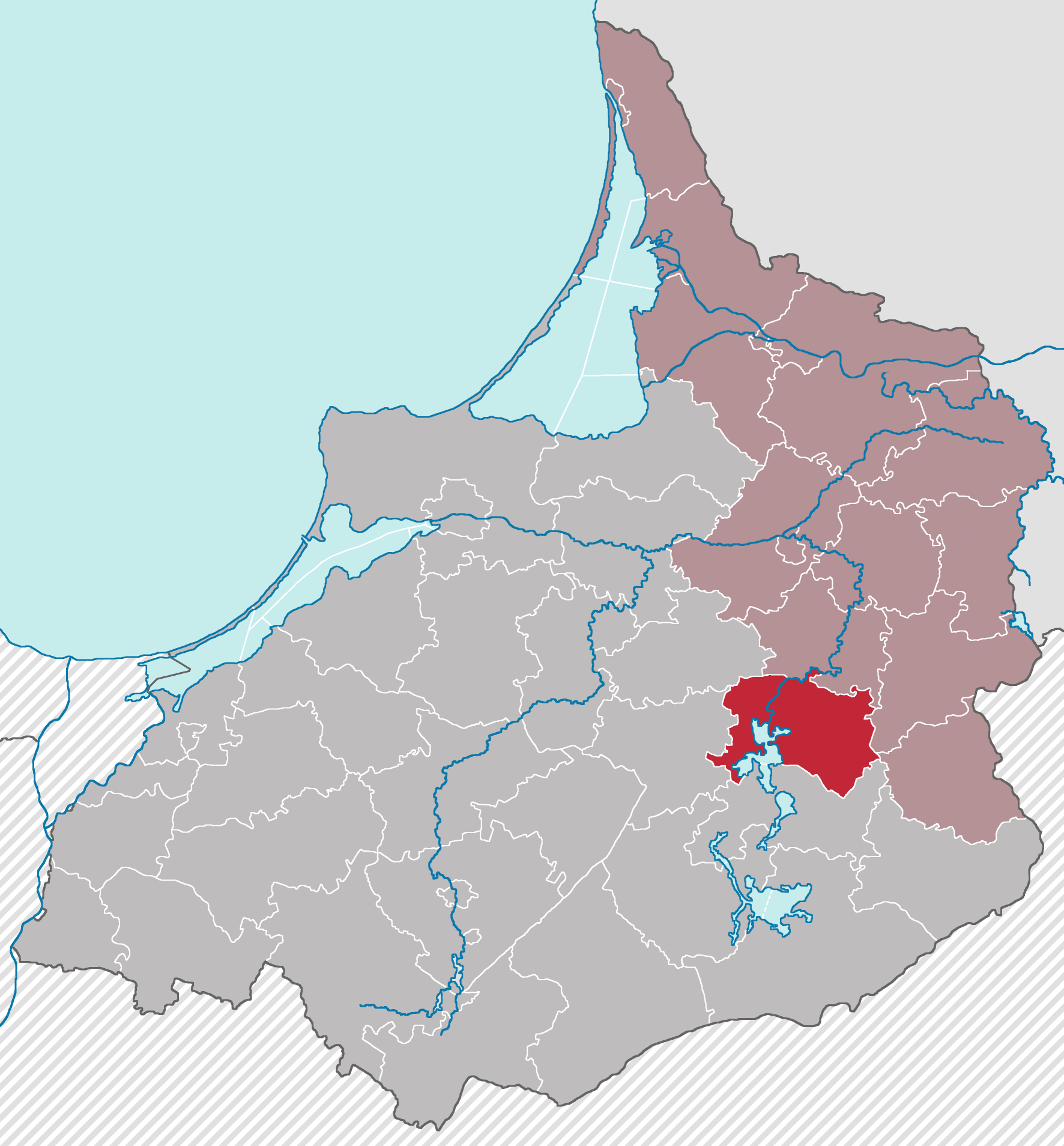
Location of the Angerburg district

The Angerburg district was a Prussian district in East Prussia that was founded in 1818 and existed until 1945. It was located in the Masurian Lake District in Masuria. The town of Angerburg was the capital of the district.

== History ==
Since the East Prussian district reform of 1752, most of the area of the Angerburg district belonged to what was then the Seehesten district. As part of the Prussian administrative reforms, the “Ordinance for Improved Establishment of the Provincial Authorities” of April 30, 1815 resulted in a comprehensive district reform in all of East Prussia, as the districts established in 1752 were too large. On September 1, 1818, the new Angerburg district was formed from the northern part of the Seehesten district in Regierungsbezirk Gumbinnen.

Since 1871, the province of Prussia (and thus also the district of Angerburg) belonged to the German Empire. After the province of Prussia was divided into the provinces of East Prussia and West Prussia, the Angerburg district became part of East Prussia on April 1, 1878.

Towards the end of World War II, the district was occupied by the Red Army in January 1945. In the summer of 1945, the district was placed under Polish administration in accordance with the Potsdam Agreement. The German population either fled or was largely expelled in the following years.

== Demographics ==
According to the Prussian census of 1846, the Angerburg district had a population of 31,477, of which 23,650 (75.1%) were Germans, 7,793 (24.8%) were Poles and 34 (0.1%) were Lithuanians. The vast majority of the population (97.7% in 1910) was Protestant.
