= Lisky =

Lisky may refer to:

- Líský, a village in the Czech Republic
- Lisky, Izmail Raion, Odesa Oblast, a village in Ukraine
- Lisky, Kyiv, an area within the Dniprovskyi District, Kyiv, Ukraine
