= Lissy Vadakkel =

Lissy Vadakkel TOSF is an Indian religious sister of the Franciscan Clarist Congregation.

In June 1989 Vadakkel was one of four sisters to establish a Catholic school at the Alphonsa Convent in Ramakrishnapur for children of employees at the Singreni Collieries Company.

Vadakkel testified in 2018 as a key witness in the rape case against Bishop Franco Mulakkal of the Roman Catholic Diocese of Jalandhar. After testifying, Vadakkel was confined in a guest house in Muvattupuzha. In February 2019 Sister Alphonsa Abraham, superior of the Franciscan Clarist Congregation's Nirmala Province, and three of her deputies were charged by Kerala police for wrongful confinement of Vadakkel. In April 2019 she became the first person in India to receive government protection as a "Group A witness" under a new law to protect witnesses in sensitive court cases. The protection was ordered on April 9 by the district judge of Kottayam.
