= Lizzie (disambiguation) =

Lizzie or Lizzy is a feminine given name.

Lizzie(s) or Lizzy may also refer to:

== Films ==
- Lizzie (1957 film), a film starring Eleanor Parker
- Lizzie (2018 film), a film starring Chloë Sevigny and Kristen Stewart

== Other uses ==
- Lake Lizzie, a lake in Minnesota, United States
- The Lizzies, an all-female gang in the 1979 film The Warriors and the video game The Warriors
- The Lizzies, sports teams at the Elizabeth Playground in Toronto, Canada, coached by Bob Abate
- Lizzy, one of the side characters from the webseries Murder Drones (2021–2024)

== See also ==
- Big Lizzie, a large tractor
- Thin Lizzy, an Irish rock band
- Tin Lizzy, a nickname for the Ford Model T automobile
