= Dąbrówka, Węgorzewo County =

Dąbrówka
- Village
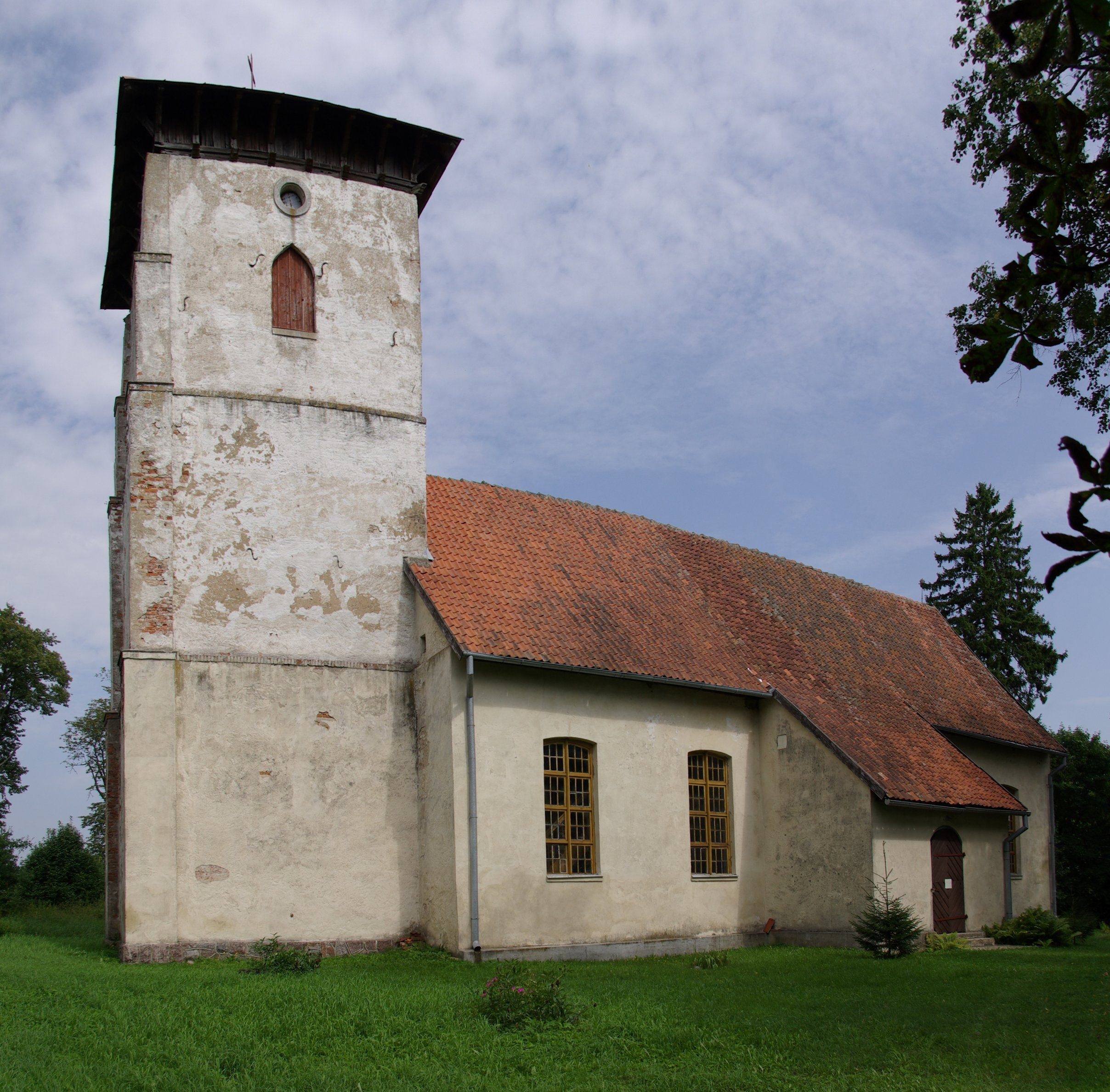
- Saint Mary church in Dąbrówka

- Location within Poland
- Coordinates: 54°20′N 21°53′E
- Country: Poland
- Voivodeship: Warmian-Masurian
- County: Węgorzewo
- Gmina: Budry
- Founded: 1563
- Time zone: UTC+1 (CET)
  - Summer (DST): UTC+2 (CEST)
- Vehicle registration: NWE

Dąbrówka [dɔmˈbrufka] (German: Dombrowken, 1938-45 Eibenburg) is a village in the administrative district of Gmina Budry, within Węgorzewo County, Warmian-Masurian Voivodeship, in northern Poland, close to the border with the Kaliningrad Oblast of Russia.

Dąbrówka was established in 1563 by brothers Marcin and Rafał, sons of Nikołaj Piotrowczyk, and Marcin Kropla, who bought land to establish the village.
