= Szarek (surname) =

Szarek is a Polish-language surname. Archaic feminine forms: Szarkowa (after husband), Szarkówna (maiden) Notable people with this surname include:

- Jan Szarek (1936–2020), Polish bishop
- Jarosław Szarek
- Piotr Szarek
- Przemysław Szarek
- Stanisław Szarek
