= Rapa, Poland =

Rapa
- Village
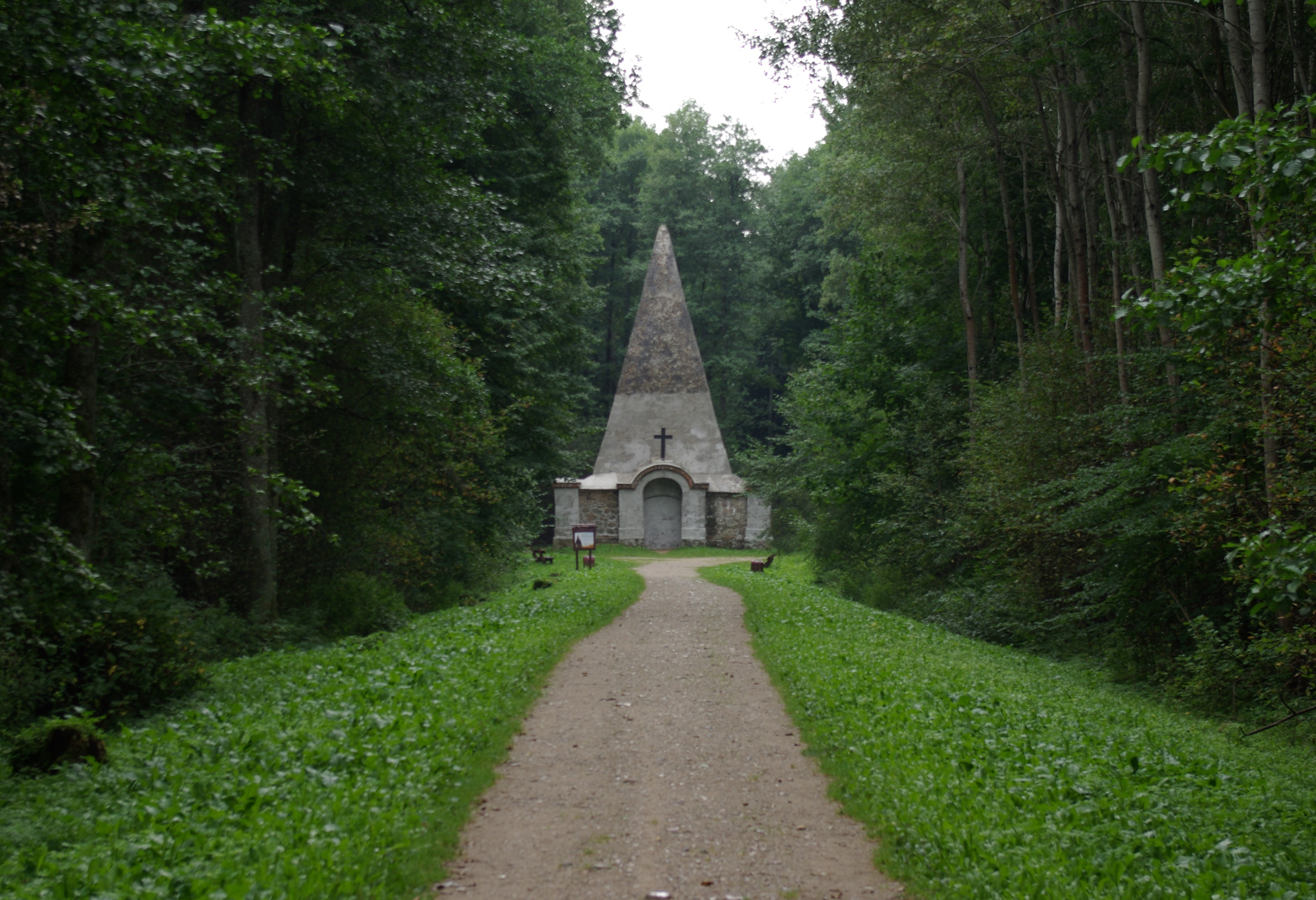
- Rapa Pyramid

- Location within Poland
- Coordinates: 54°19′N 22°1′E
- Country: Poland
- Voivodeship: Warmian-Masurian
- County: Gołdap
- Gmina: Banie Mazurskie
- Time zone: UTC+1 (CET)
  - Summer (DST): UTC+2 (CEST)
- Vehicle registration: NGO

Rapa ([ˈrapa]) is a village in the administrative district of Gmina Banie Mazurskie, within Gołdap County, Warmian-Masurian Voivodeship, in northern Poland, close to the border with the Kaliningrad Oblast of Russia.

== History and pyramid ==
In the past, the region was at various times part of Poland, Prussia and Germany. The village existed in the early seventeenth century. In 1750, the owner Jacob John Hoffmann built a palace, taken in 1793 by Johann Friedrich Wilhelm von Fahrenheid.

In 1811, a mausoleum was built in Rapa for the Fahrenheid family, designed by sculptor Bertel Thorvaldsen. The building is shaped like a pyramid with a height of 15.9 metres (52 ft) and is loosely inspired by the architecture of ancient Egypt. The family members buried there were mummified. In 1945, the mausoleum was severely damaged by soldiers of the Red Army.

In 1938, during a massive Nazi campaign of renaming of placenames the village was renamed to Kleinangerapp. It became again part of Poland following Germany's defeat in World War II in 1945.
