= Żabin, Warmian-Masurian Voivodeship =

Żabin
- Village
- Location within Poland
- Coordinates: 54°20′N 22°3′E
- Country: Poland
- Voivodeship: Warmian-Masurian
- County: Gołdap
- Gmina: Banie Mazurskie

Population
  - Total: 210
- Time zone: UTC+1 (CET)
  - Summer (DST): UTC+2 (CEST)
- Vehicle registration: NGO

Żabin [ˈʐabin] is a village in the administrative district of Gmina Banie Mazurskie, within Gołdap County, Warmian-Masurian Voivodeship, in northern Poland, close to the border with the Kaliningrad Oblast of Russia. It is located in Masuria.

Polish, Lithuanian and German-language services were held in the church, as of the 18th century. The first three pastors of the local parish were from the Polish noble family of Wierciński, all appointed in the 16th century.

There are two cemeteries—one German, one Russian—from World War I located in the town.
