= Krasnaya (river) =

Krasnaya Rominta
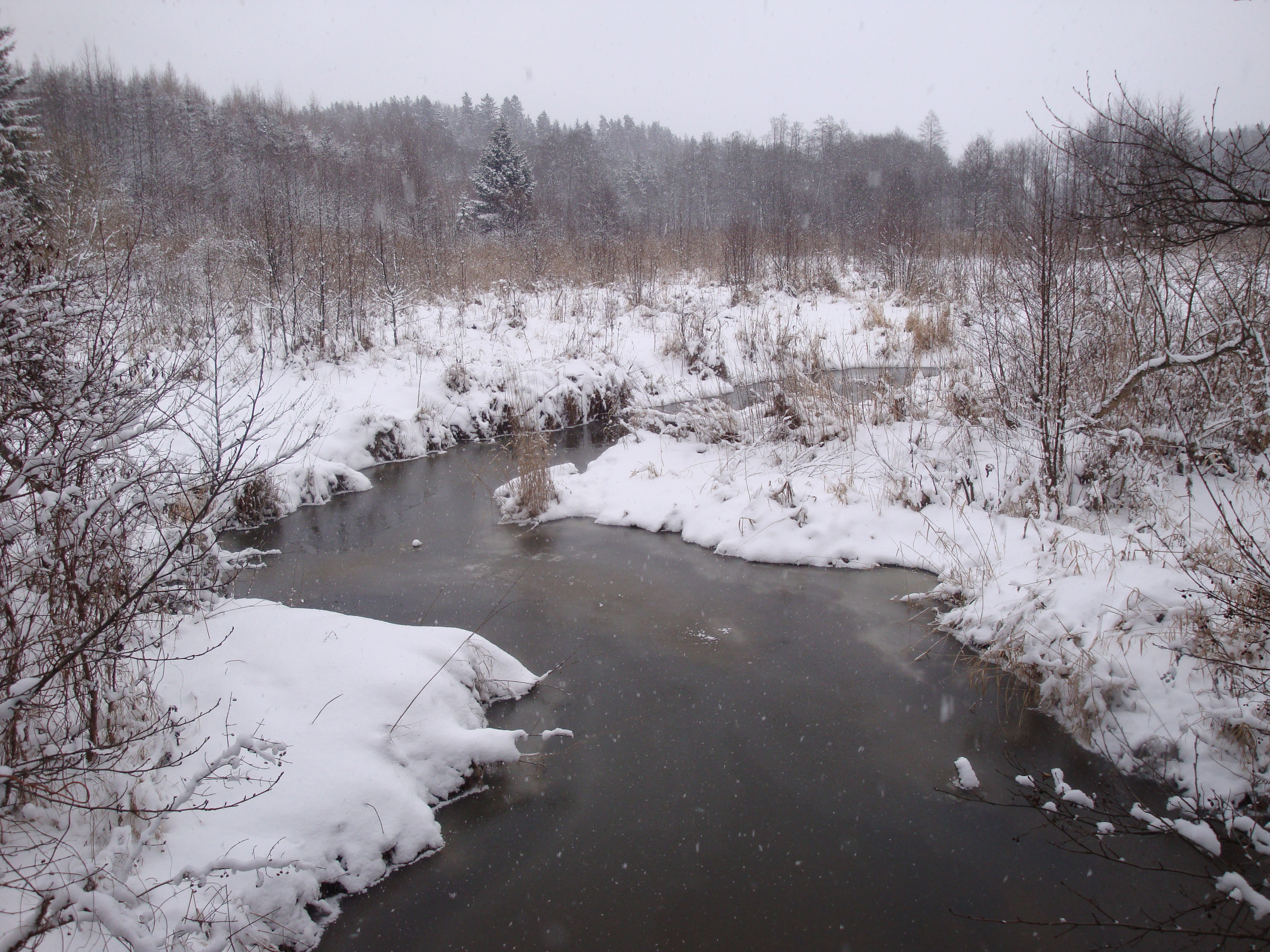
- Rominta/Krasnaya River near the village Błędziszki in Poland

Location
- Country: Poland, Russia

Physical characteristics
- Mouth
  - location: Pissa
  - coordinates: 54.5889°N 22.2164°E

Basin features
- Progression: Pissa→ Angrapa→ Pregolya→ Baltic Sea

The Krasnaya (Russian: Красная река; Polish: Rominta; German: Rominte; Lithuanian: Rominta) is a river in Russia's Kaliningrad Oblast and Poland's Warmian-Masurian Voivodeship.

The Krasnaya flows through Romincka Forest and flows into the Pissa at Gusev. Krasnolesye, Russia is one of the many villages and towns located on the river.

== Geography ==
The river originates as the Błędzianka (English: Blindė) from Lake Werselskie (Gmina Przerośl) in the Polish Podlaskie Voivodeship. It initially curves southwest, then enters the Warmian-Masurian Voivodeship northeast of Przerośl, thus entering the former East Prussia. It flows through the Rominter Heide, (a nature reserve on the Polish-Russian border and a traditional hunting area), crosses the border into Russia, receives the Chornaya River from the left, and flows north-northwest until it empties into the Pissa River near Gusev (formerly Gumbinnen).

The German name “Rominte” derives from the Old Prussian word “romus/ramus”, meaning "calm" or "well-behaved."
