= Jarka =

Location
- Country: Poland
- Voivodeship: Warmian–Masurian

Physical characteristics
- Source
  - location: Border of powiaty Olecko and Gołdap, between Szeszki and Rudzie
  - coordinates: 54°11′18″N 22°20′23″E
- Mouth: Gołdapa
  - location: northeast of Gołdap
  - coordinates: 54.3327°N 22.3432°E
- Length: 32.4 km (20.1 mi)
- Basin size: 237.1 km^{2} (91.5 mi^{2})

Basin features
- Progression: Gołdapa→ Angrapa→ Pregolya→ Baltic Sea

Jarka is a river of Poland. It is the upper course of the river Gołdapa, upstream from Lake Gołdap, near Gołdap.
