= Carinhall =

German stately home

Coordinates: 53°00′31″N 13°38′11″E

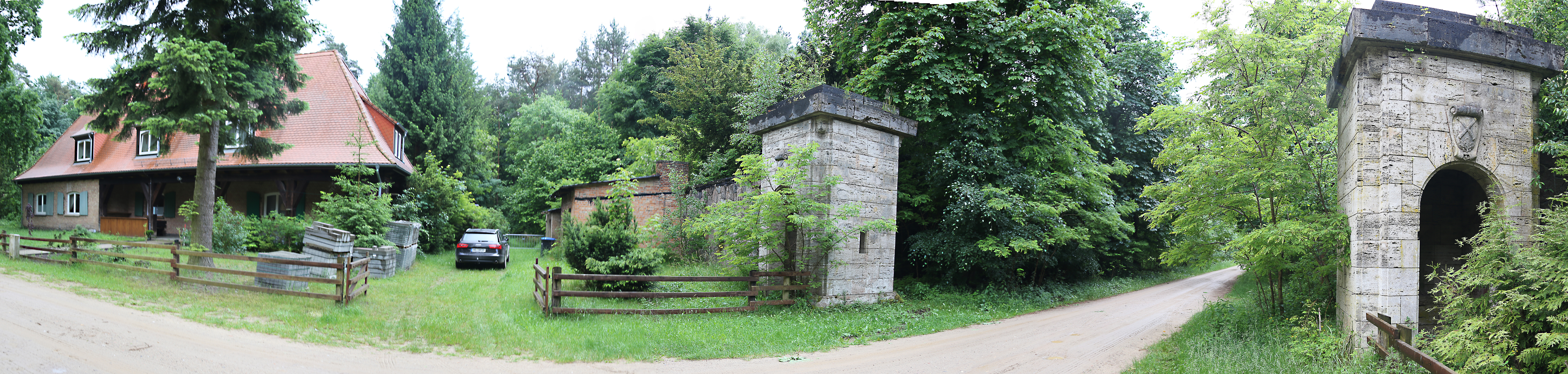
The surviving entrance gates of Carinhall

Carinhall was the country residence of Hermann Göring, built in the 1930s on a large hunting estate north-east of Berlin in the Schorfheide Forest, in the north of Brandenburg, between the lakes of Großdöllner See and Wuckersee.

== History ==
Named in memory of his Swedish first wife, Carin Göring (1888–1931), the residence was constructed in stages from 1933 on a large scale.

In June 1933, Göring commissioned the architect Werner March to build a Swedish-style hunting lodge. Carin Göring's remains had first been interred in Sweden following her death, but were moved to Carinhall in 1934 and placed in a crypt on the grounds.

On 10 April 1935, Carinhall was the venue for Göring's wedding banquet with his second wife, Emmy Sonnemann.

Carinhall became the destination for many of Göring's looted art treasures from across occupied Europe.

== Emmyhall ==
The Reichsjägerhof, Göring's smaller hunting lodge at Rominten in East Prussia (now Krasnolesye), in the Rominten Heath, was known as "Emmyhall" after his second wife.

== Fate ==
To prevent Carinhall from falling into the hands of the advancing Red Army, the compound was blown up on 28 April 1945 at Göring's orders by a Luftwaffe demolition squad. Many of the art treasures were evacuated beforehand to Berchtesgaden, but many also remained behind, some hidden in bunkers or buried in the gardens, where they were discovered, looted, and vandalized by Soviet soldiers and local residents.

Only the monumental entrance gates, a few foundation structures, and decorative stones remain from the building. A bronze statue by Franz von Stuck, Kämpfende Amazone (1897), once at Carinhall, is now at Eberswalde. Another statue, Kronenhirsch by Johannes Darsow, can be found at Tierpark Berlin in the district of Friedrichsfelde. A Roman sarcophagus decorated with lions, which Göring had acquired in 1942 from an art dealer in Rome, was recovered from the ruins and is now on display in the Neues Museum in Berlin.

== Gallery ==
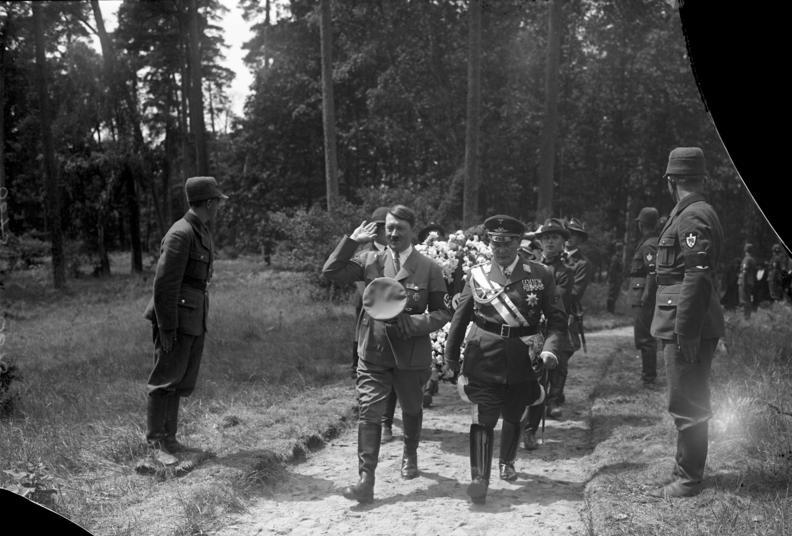
Hitler and Göring head Carin Göring's funeral procession at Carinhall, 19 June 1934

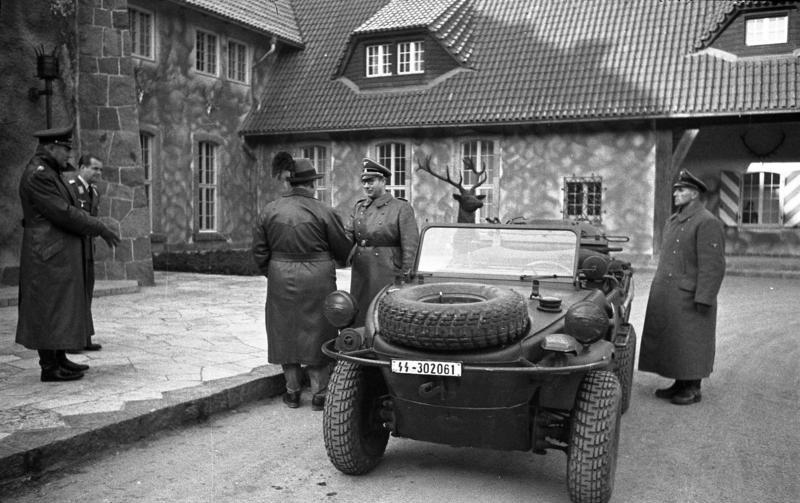
Göring greeting an SS officer at Carinhall

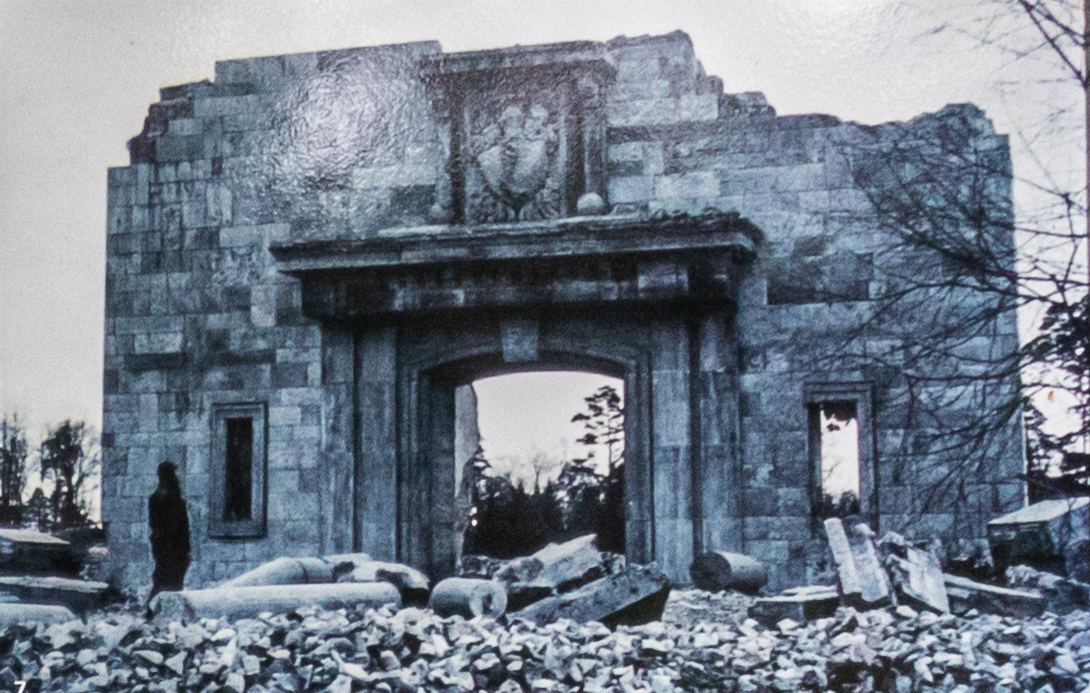
Carinhall in ruins, 1947

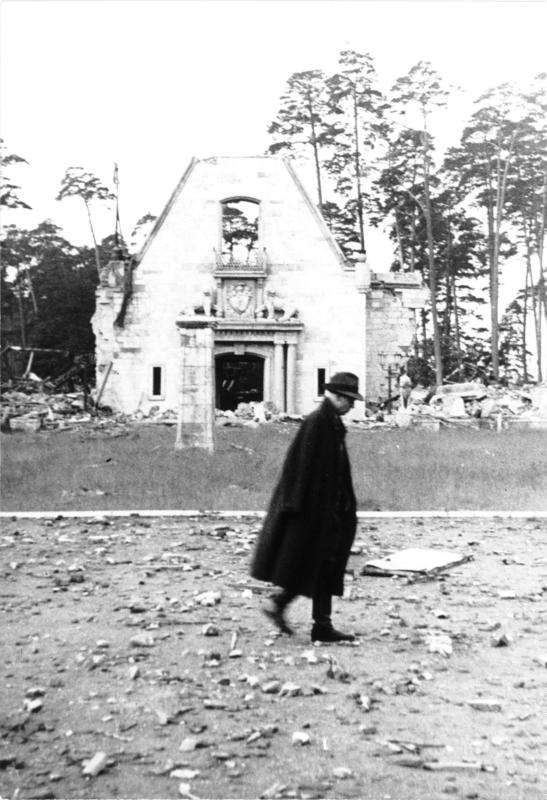
Carinhall in ruins, 1947

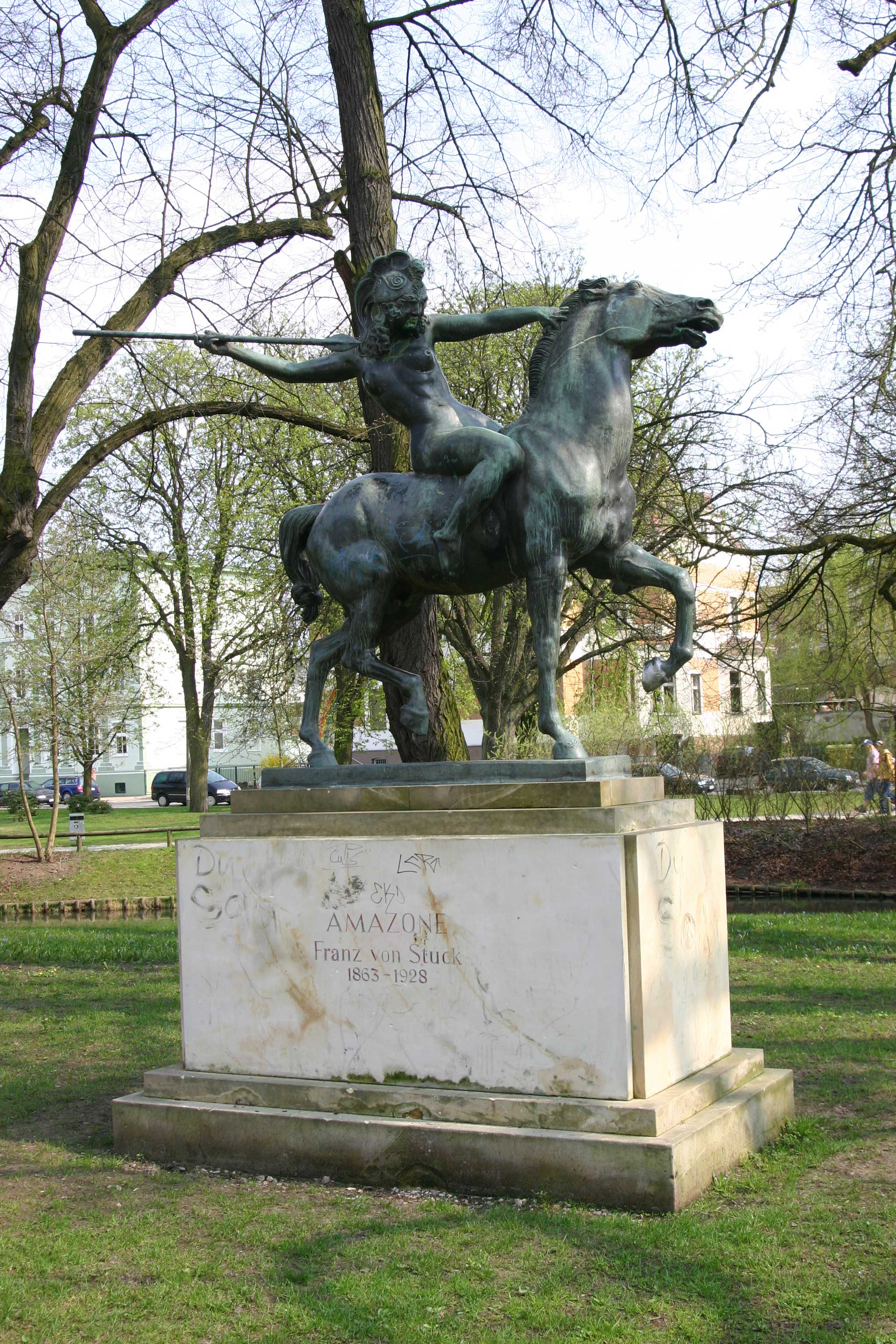
Franz von Stuck: Kämpfende Amazone (1897) formerly at Carinhall, now at Eberswalde

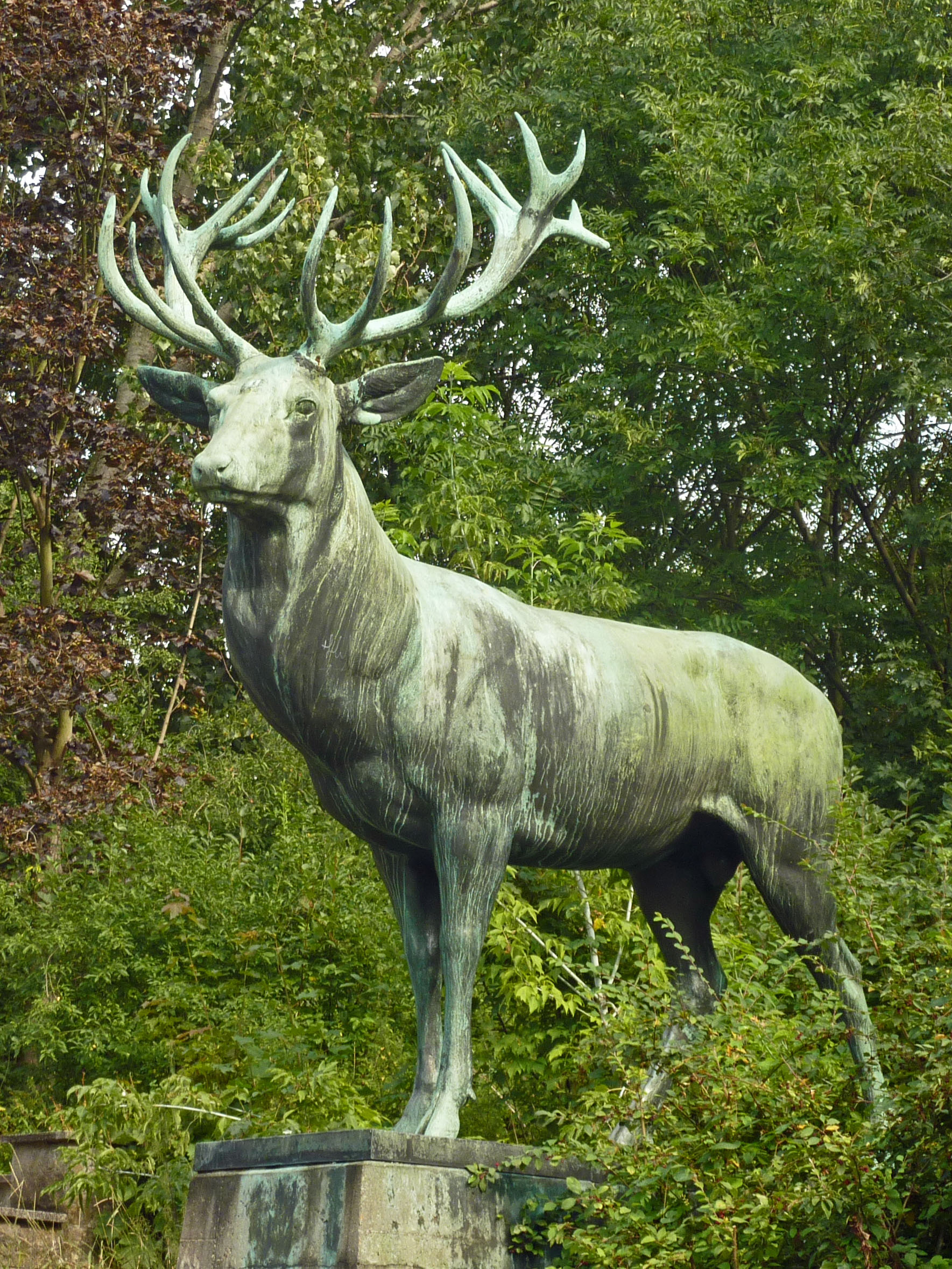
Kronenhirsch (1937) formerly at Carinhall, now at Tierpark Berlin

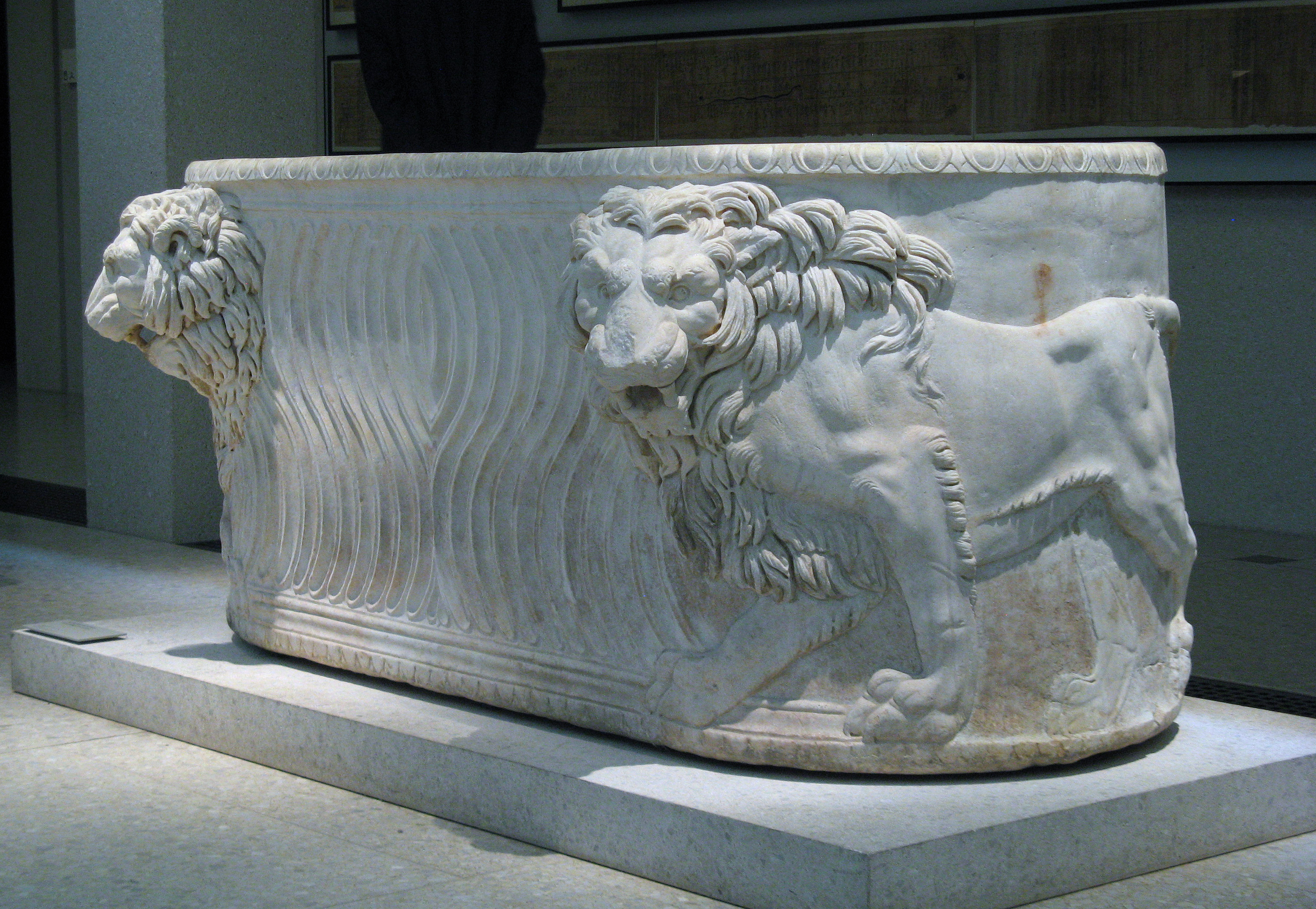
Roman sarcophagus, formerly at Carinhall, now in the Neues Museum, Berlin

== Legacy ==
In 1999, new interest was sparked by the book Görings Reich: Selbstinszenierungen in Carinhall which led to treasure hunters visiting the ruins, and concerns raised about the site becoming a neo-Nazi "shrine". The state government of Brandenburg ordered the remains of the tomb of Göring's wife to be demolished.

== See also ==
- Nazi architecture
- Hermann Göring Collection

== Sources ==
- Roger Manvell - Der Reichsmarschall. 1983. ISBN 3-8118-4370-2
- Leonard Mosley - The Reich Marshal: A Biography of Hermann Goering. 1975. ISBN 3-420-04727-4
- Carlos Díaz Domínguez - Tres colores en Carinhall 2011. ISBN 978-84-666-4192-0
