= Stańczyki =

- Village
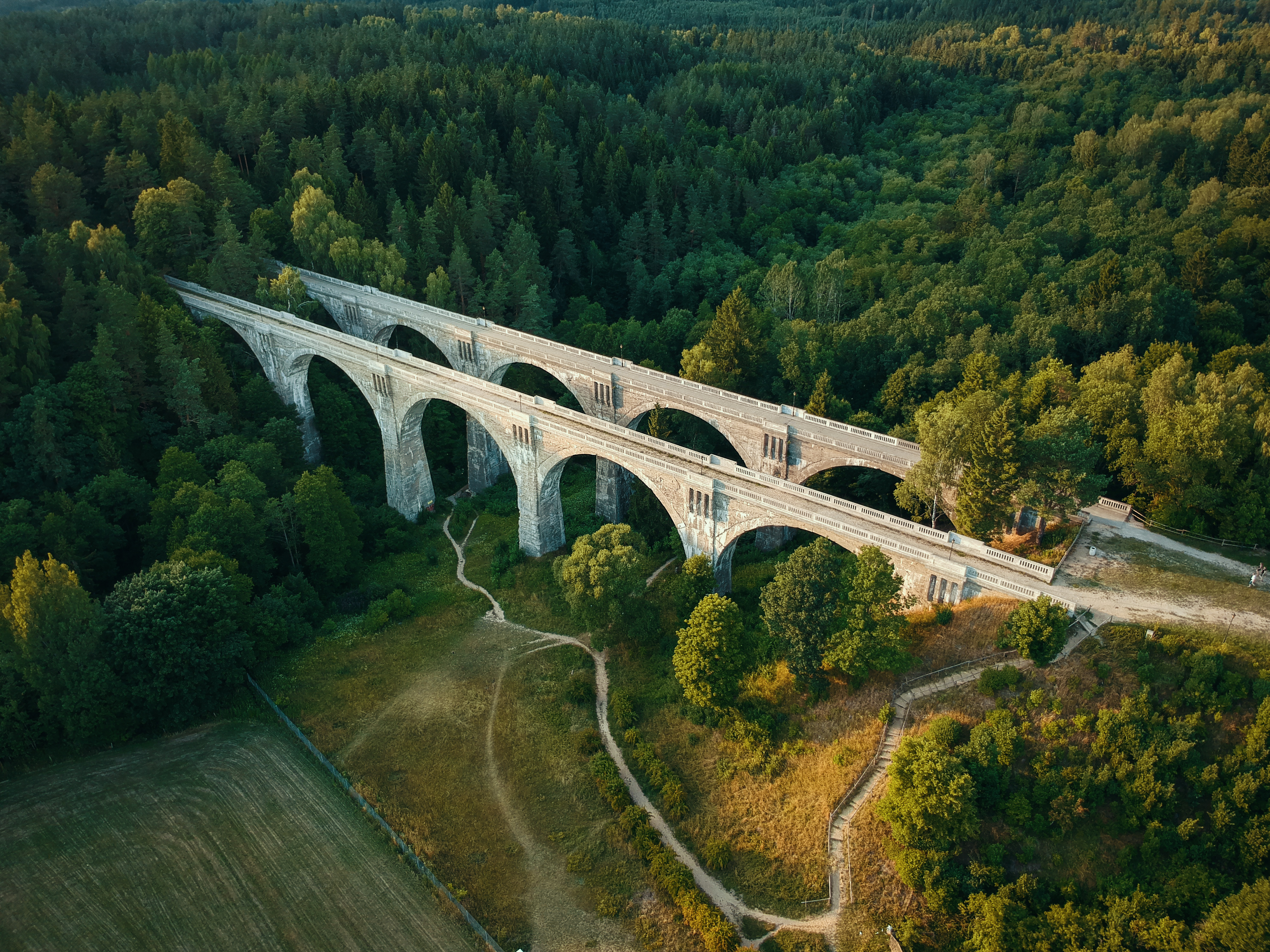
- Viaduct at Stańczyki

- Location within Poland
- Coordinates: 54°17′34″N 22°39′26″E
- Country: Poland
- Voivodeship: Warmian-Masurian
- County: Gołdap
- Gmina: Dubeninki
- Population: 35

Stańczyki [staɲˈt͡ʂɨki] is a village in the administrative district of Gmina Dubeninki, within Gołdap County, Warmian-Masurian Voivodeship, in northern Poland, close to the border with the Kaliningrad Oblast of Russia.

It is notable for two large railway viaducts of the (now defunct) Gołdap-Żytkiejmy railway. Roughly 200 metres long and 36 metres high, both are among the largest such constructions in Poland. Built of reinforced concrete, each of the bridges has five arches of 15 metres of length each. The northern viaduct was constructed between 1912 and 1914, the southern one was added between 1923 and 1926.
