= Boczki =

Boczki may refer to:

- Boczki, Łowicz County in Łódź Voivodeship (central Poland)
- Boczki, Zduńska Wola County in Łódź Voivodeship (central Poland)
- Boczki, Zgierz County in Łódź Voivodeship (central Poland)
- Boczki, Warmian-Masurian Voivodeship (north Poland)
