= Emmy Göring =

German actress (1893–1973)

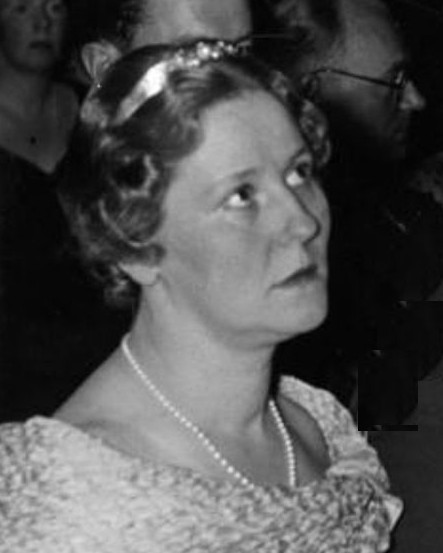
- Göring in 1935
- Born: Emma Johanna Henny Sonnemann; 24 March 1893; Hamburg, Germany
- Died: 8 June 1973 (aged 80); Munich, West Germany
- Resting place: Munich Waldfriedhof
- Occupation: Actress
- Spouses: Karl Köstlin (m. 1916; div. 1926) Hermann Göring (m. 1935; died 1946)
- Children: Edda Göring

Emma Johanna Henny Göring (née Sonnemann; 24 March 1893 – 8 June 1973) was a German actress and the second wife of Luftwaffe commander-in-chief Hermann Göring. She served as Adolf Hitler's hostess at many state functions and thereby staked a claim to the title of "First Lady of the Third Reich", a title also sometimes conferred upon Magda Goebbels.

== Early life ==
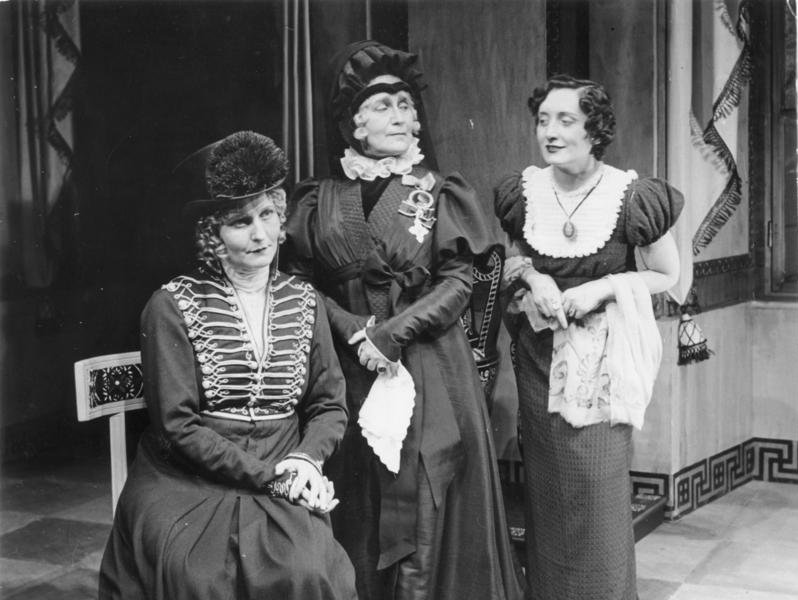
Emmy Sonnemann (left) in 1935

She was born Emma Johanna Henny Sonnemann in Hamburg, Germany, on 24 March 1893 to a wealthy salesman. After schooling, she became an actress at the National Theatre in Weimar.

On 13 January 1916, Sonnemann married actor Karl Köstlin in Trieste, Austria-Hungary. Thereafter, she was known as Emmy Köstlin. In her autobiography, Göring said that she and Köstlin soon realized that they were more suited as friends and soon separated. They eventually divorced in 1926.

== Marriage to Hermann Göring ==
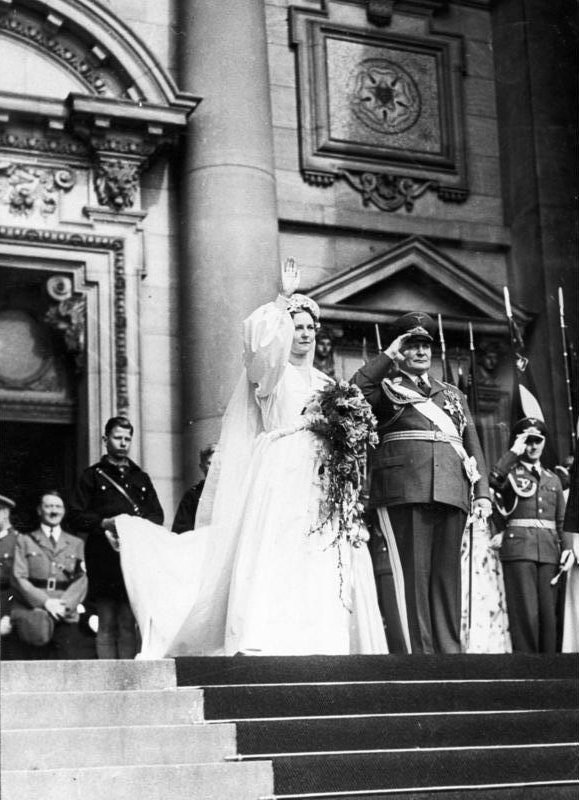
Emmy and Hermann Göring after the wedding in front of the Berlin cathedral with Hitler behind them to the left

On 10 April 1935, in a church ceremony she married the prominent Nazi and Luftwaffe chief Hermann Göring, becoming Emmy Göring. It was also Göring's second marriage; his first wife, Carin, had died in October 1931. She was given an unsolicited membership to the Nazi Party during Christmas 1938.

Their daughter, Edda Göring, was born on 2 June 1938, when Emmy was 45 years old. Edda was reported as being named after the Countess of Cortellazzo and Buccari, eldest child of Benito Mussolini. Time reported: "Herr and Frau Göring became her fast friends." However, in her autobiography, Göring said her daughter was named after one of her friends.

In 1940, Der Stürmer magazine printed a story alleging that Edda had been conceived by artificial insemination, implying that her husband was impotent. Hermann Göring demanded that the Nazi Party take action against the editor, Julius Streicher. Streicher, whose position was already shaky within the party, was stripped of party titles, but allowed to go on publishing Der Stürmer from his farm near Nuremberg. German anti-Nazi diarist Friedrich Reck-Malleczewen recorded in 1941 that he had personally overheard the "wife of Göring’s personal physician give the details...to her companion on exactly how the artificial insemination of Frau Goring had been achieved."

Hermann Göring named his country house Carinhall after his first wife, while referring to his hunting lodge at Rominten (now Krasnolesye) – the Reichsjägerhof – as "Emmyhall".

=== "First Lady of the Third Reich" ===
Emmy served as Hitler's hostess at many state functions prior to the Second World War. This and her claim to be the "First Lady of the Third Reich" created much animosity between herself and Hitler's future wife, Eva Braun, whom she snubbed and openly despised. Hitler consequently issued angry instructions to Hermann Göring demanding that Emmy treat Eva with more respect; one of the outcomes of Emmy's condescending attitude toward Eva was that she was no longer invited to Hitler's Bavarian retreat, the Berghof. As for Eva Braun, she allegedly never forgave Emmy for having assumed the role of "First Lady of the Reich". Emmy and Magda Goebbels, the wife of Propaganda Minister Joseph Goebbels, also tried to outshine each other, hosting lavish parties and dressing like royalty.

As wife of one of the richest and most powerful men in Europe, she received much public attention, was constantly photographed, and enjoyed a lavish lifestyle well into the Second World War. Her husband owned mansions, estates and castles in Austria, Germany and Poland and was a major beneficiary of the Nazis' confiscation of art and wealth from Jews and others deemed enemies by the Nazi regime. Her husband celebrated their daughter's birth by ordering 500 planes to fly over Berlin (he stated he would have flown 1,000 planes as a salute for a son) and the family had a private box at the theatre. She also hosted foreign dignitaries, such as Edward, Duke of Windsor and Wallis Simpson in 1937. Following her husband's promotion to Reichsmarschall in 1940, she was addressed as Frau Reichsmarschall, that is (literally) Mrs. Reichsmarschall.

After the end of the war, she was arrested at her home in Sackdilling for suspected complicity in her husband's art thefts, and was imprisoned at Straubing camp, 140 kilometres (90 miles) from Nuremberg, with her sister, niece and a servant. Her daughter Edda was initially separated from her and held with her nanny in a residence about ten miles away, with no contact allowed. However, Edda was brought to join her at Straubing after US Army psychiatrist Douglas Kelley applied pressure on American authorities, believing that the mother-daughter separation was causing Hermann Göring enough anxiety to "damage his mental and physical health."

A German denazification court convicted her of being a Nazi and sentenced her to one year in jail. When she was released, 30 percent of her property was confiscated, and she was banned from the stage for five years. She was unable to revive her career.

== Later years and death ==
Some years after her release from jail, Emmy secured a very small flat in a building in the city of Munich and remained there for the rest of her life. In her final years, she suffered from sciatica. In 1967 she wrote an autobiography, An der Seite meines Mannes (literally By My Man’s Side), published in English as My Life with Goering in 1972.

Emmy died in Munich on 8 June 1973 at the age of 80. She is buried at Munich Waldfriedhof.

== Selected filmography ==
- William Tell (1934)

== Sources ==
- El-Hai, Jack (2013). The Nazi and the Psychiatrist: Hermann Göring, Dr. Douglas M. Kelley, and a Fatal Meeting of Minds at the End of WWII. New York: PublicAffairs. ISBN 978-1-61039-156-6.
- Göring, Emmy (1972). My Life with Göring. London: David Bruce & Watson.
- Gun, N.E. (1968) Eva Braun, Coronet Books.
- Hamilton, Charles (1984). Leaders & Personalities of the Third Reich, Vol. 1. R. James Bender Publishing. ISBN 0-912138-27-0.
- Klee, E. (2007) Das Kulturlexikon zum Dritten Reich. Wer war was vor und nach 1945 (The Cultural Encyclopedia of the Third Reich. Who was What before and after 1945), S. Fischer:Frankfurt am Main. ISBN 978-3-10-039326-5.
- Longerich, Peter (2015). Goebbels: A Biography. New York: Random House. ISBN 978-1400067510.
- Sigmund, Anna Maria (1998). "Emmy Göring: Die »Hohe Frau«". Die Frauen der Nazis (in German). Wien: Ueberreuter. pp. 47–71. ISBN 3-8000-3699-1.
- Thacker, Toby (2010) [2009]. Joseph Goebbels: Life and Death. New York: Palgrave Macmillan. ISBN 978-0-230-27866-0.
