= Gołdapa =

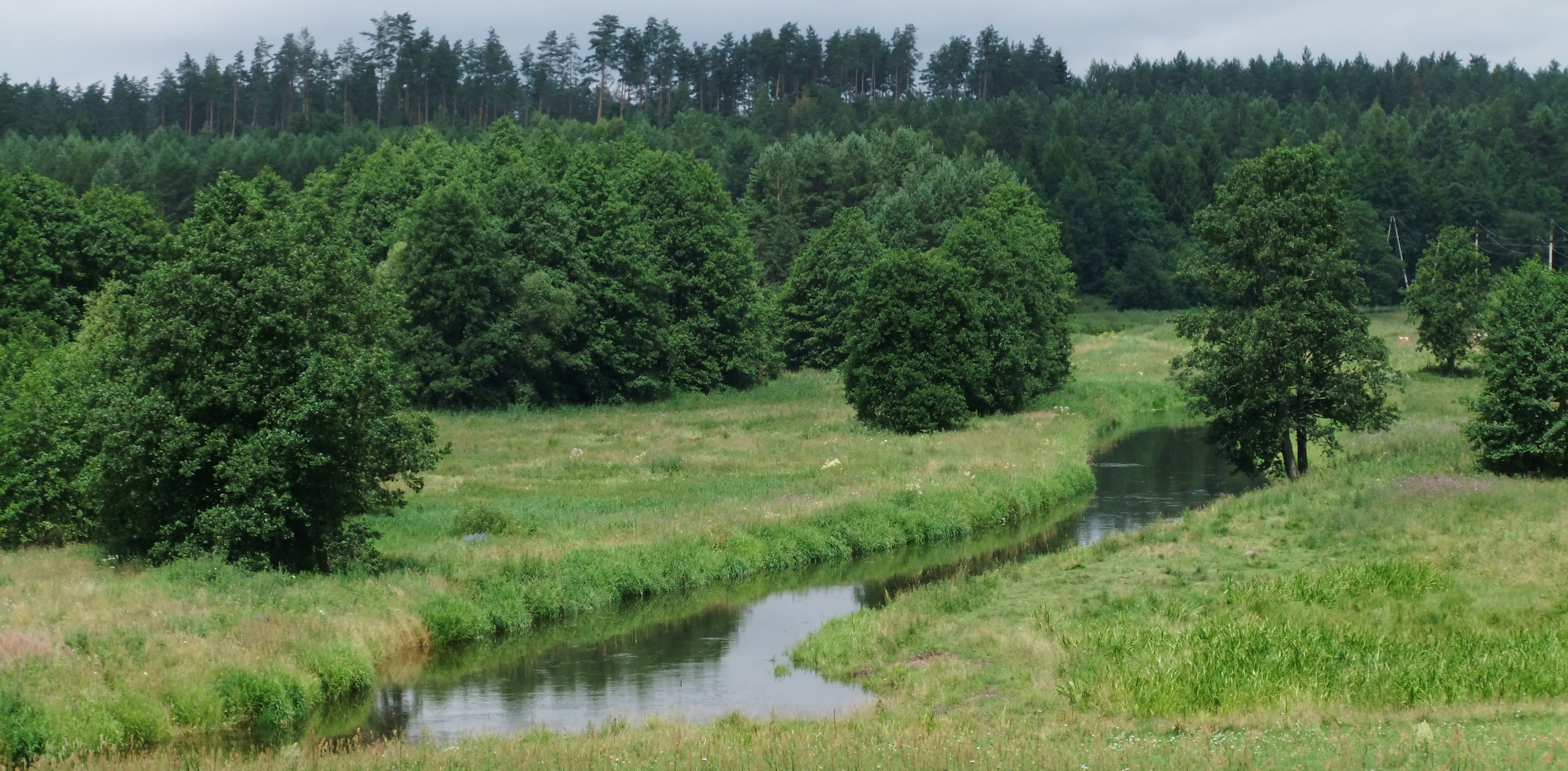

Location
- Country: Poland

Physical characteristics
- Mouth
  - location: Angrapa
  - coordinates: 54.2936°N 21.8550°E

Basin features
- Progression: Angrapa→ Pregolya→ Baltic Sea

The Gołdapa (German: Goldap, Lithuanian: Geldapė) is a river in Poland's Warmian-Masurian Voivodeship. It develops out of the Wzgórza Szeskie south of Gołdap, then flows through the Romincka Forest before reaching Gołdap. It empties into the Angrapa north of the village Budry.

The river is named after the Old Prussian word galdape, meaning "river in the valley/depression".
