= Markowo =

Markowo may refer to the following places:

- Markowo, Inowrocław County in Kuyavian-Pomeranian Voivodeship (north-central Poland)
- Markowo, Włocławek County in Kuyavian-Pomeranian Voivodeship (north-central Poland)
- Markowo, Podlaskie Voivodeship (north-east Poland)
- Markowo, Greater Poland Voivodeship (west-central Poland)
- Markowo, Gołdap County in Warmian-Masurian Voivodeship (north Poland)
- Markowo, Ostróda County in Warmian-Masurian Voivodeship (north Poland)
