= Krasnolesye =

Krasnolesye Красноле́сье
- Rural locality
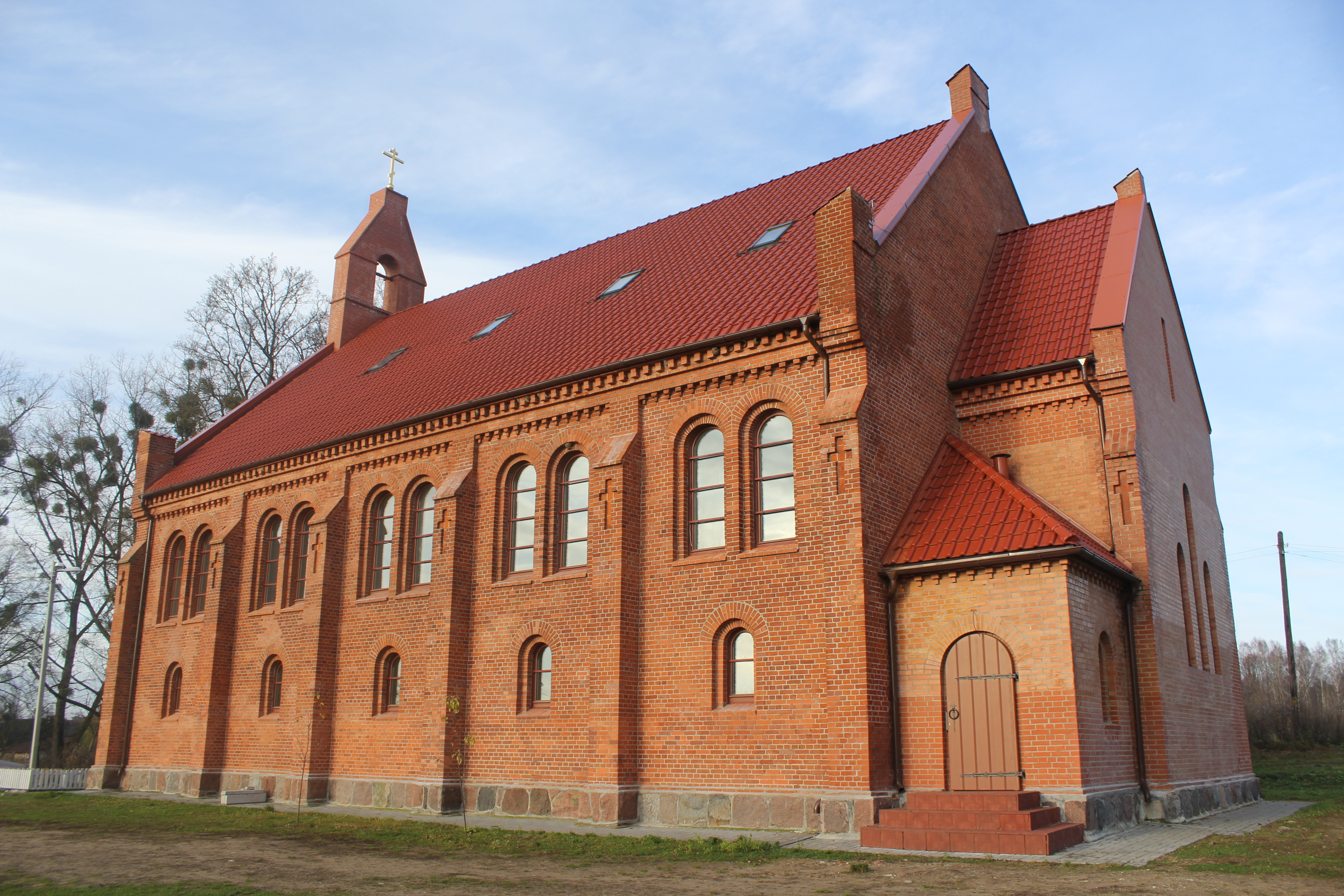
- Church
- Interactive map of Krasnolesye
- Location of Krasnolesye Krasnolesye (European Russia) Krasnolesye (Russia)
- Coordinates: 54°23′40″N 22°22′30″E
- Country: Russia
- Federal subject: Kaliningrad Oblast
- Elevation: 150 m (490 ft)

Population
  - Estimate (2010): 415 )
- Time zone: UTC+2 (MSK–1)
- Postal code: 238023
- OKTMO ID: 27624406151

Krasnolesye (Russian: Красноле́сье; German: Rominten, Groß-Rominten, Hardteck; Polish: Rominty Wielkie; Lithuanian: Raminta, Rominta) is a settlement in Nesterovsky District of Kaliningrad Oblast, Russia, situated on the Krasnaya River (Rominta) close to the border with Poland, in the north of the Romincka Forest. East of Krasnolesye lies Lake Vistytis.

== History ==
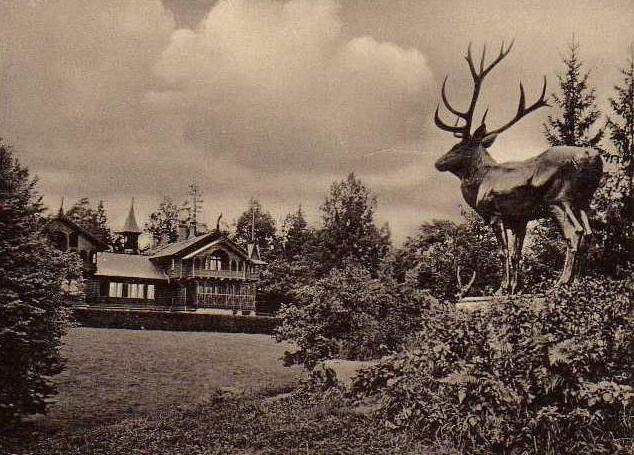
Hunting lodge in 1914

The village goes back to a hunting lodge which was first mentioned in a document of 1572. The village later became a colony of tar distillers. Until 1657, it was under the suzerainty of the Kingdom of Poland. Rominten had already been a hunting place for Prince Elector Frederick William of Brandenburg-Prussia in 1683. The region was elevated to an Imperial Court Hunting District by German Emperor Wilhelm II in 1890. The emperor's Rominten Hunting Lodge was built in 1891. After World War I Rominten remained a state hunting district, while the Lodge remained Wilhelm's private property (including Kaiserbahnhof Groß Rominten).

In September 1933 Wilhelm refused to allow Hermann Göring to stay in the lodge, subsequently Göring built his Reichsjägerhof Rominten. After Wilhelm's death Göring forced the heirs to sell the Lodge to himself. Göring used the new structure until the arrival of the Red Army in 1944.

In 1938 Groß-Rominten was renamed Hardteck to erase traces of non-German origin. When East Prussia was divided between Russia and Poland after World War II, Rominten became part of the Soviet Union. In 1947, it was renamed Krasnolesye (Red Woods).
