= Wystruć =

Wystruć may refer to:

- Wystruć, the Polish name for the Instruch River flowing through the Kaliningrad Oblast
- Wystruć, the Polish name for the town of Chernyakhovsk
