= Bludzie Małe =

- Village
- Location within Poland
- Coordinates: 54°19′N 22°35′E
- Country: Poland
- Voivodeship: Warmian-Masurian
- County: Gołdap
- Gmina: Dubeninki
- Population: 60

Bludzie Małe ([ˈblud͡ʑɛ ˈmawɛ]; German: Klein Bludschen, 1938–1945 Klein Forsthausen) is a village in the administrative district of Gmina Dubeninki, within Gołdap County, Warmian-Masurian Voivodeship, in northern Poland, close to the border with the Kaliningrad Oblast of Russia.
