= Degucie, Warmian-Masurian Voivodeship =

Degucie
- Village
- Location within Poland
- Coordinates: 54°19′31″N 22°42′48″E
- Country: Poland
- Voivodeship: Warmian-Masurian
- County: Gołdap
- Gmina: Dubeninki
- Population: 70

Degucie ([dɛˈɡut͡ɕɛ]; Lithuanian: Degučiai) is a village in the administrative district of Gmina Dubeninki, within Gołdap County, Warmian-Masurian Voivodeship, in northern Poland, close to the border with the Kaliningrad Oblast of Russia.
