= Pissa (river) =

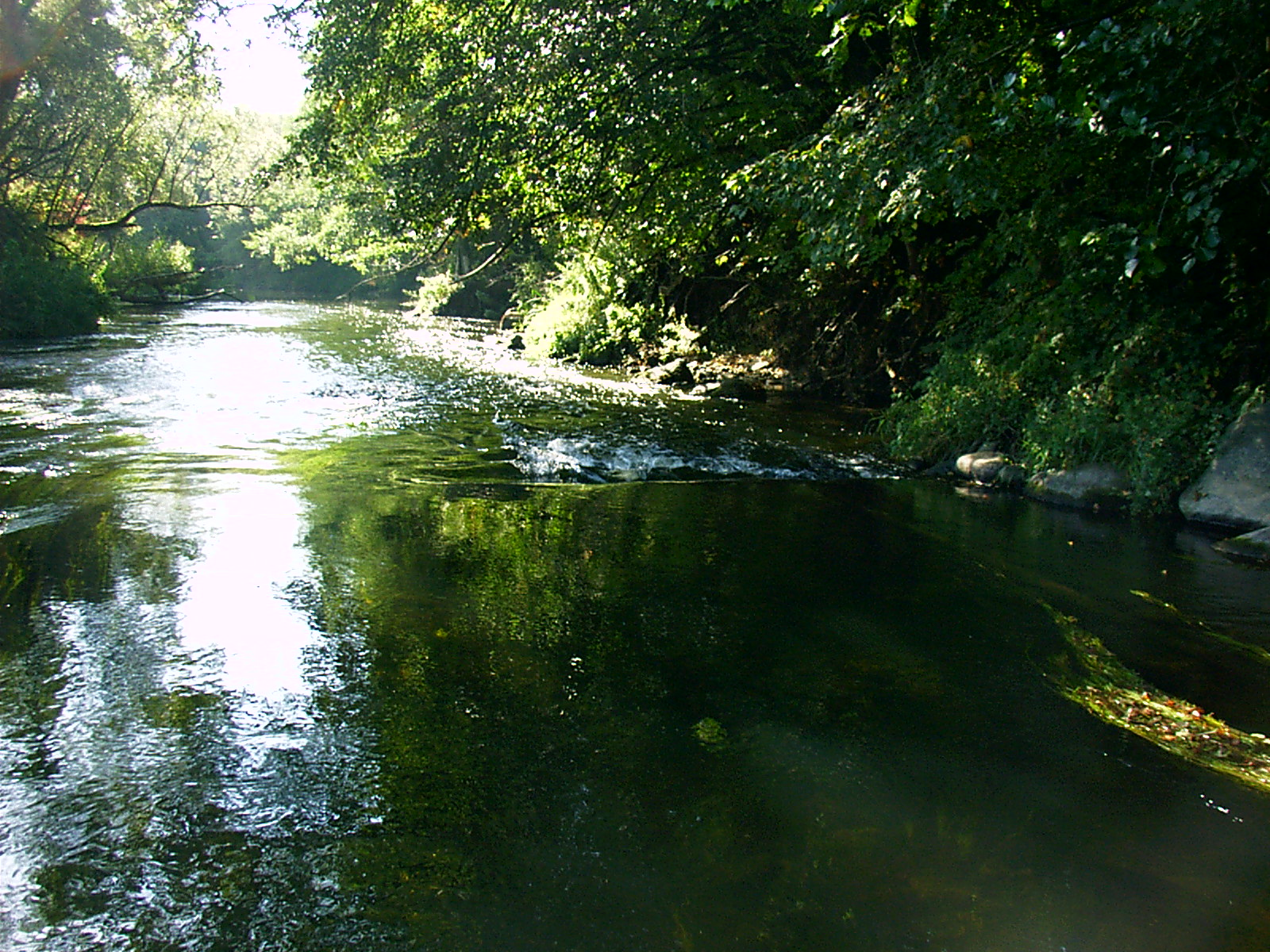

Location
- Country: Russia

Physical characteristics
- Source
  - location: Lake Vištytis
  - coordinates: 54.4521°N 22.7009°E
- Mouth
  - location: Angrapa
  - coordinates: 54.6362°N 21.9075°E

Basin features
- Progression: Angrapa→ Pregolya→ Baltic Sea

The Pissa (Russian: Писса) is a river in the Kaliningrad Oblast in Russia near Chernyakhovsk.

== Etymology ==
The Pissa, Inster and Angerapp (Angrapa) are tributaries to the Pregel river. These names, of Old Prussian origin, were used by Germans of East Prussia until 1945.

According to an anecdote, the inhabitants of Gumbinnen were embarrassed by the name (sounding similar to the vulgar word Pisse, cognate to English "piss") and asked King Friedrich Wilhelm IV for a name change. He is said to have replied "Approved. Recommend Urinoco" - a toilet pun on Orinoco.

== See also ==
- Vištytis (lake)
