= Kociołki, Warmian-Masurian Voivodeship =

Kociołki
- Village
- Location within Poland
- Coordinates: 54°17′38.6″N 22°27′37.13″E
- Country: Poland
- Voivodeship: Warmian-Masurian
- County: Gołdap
- Gmina: Dubeninki

Kociołki [kɔˈt͡ɕɔu̯ki] is a village in the administrative district of Gmina Dubeninki, within Gołdap County, Warmian-Masurian Voivodeship, in northern Poland, close to the border with the Kaliningrad Oblast of Russia.
