= Kiekskiejmy =

- Village
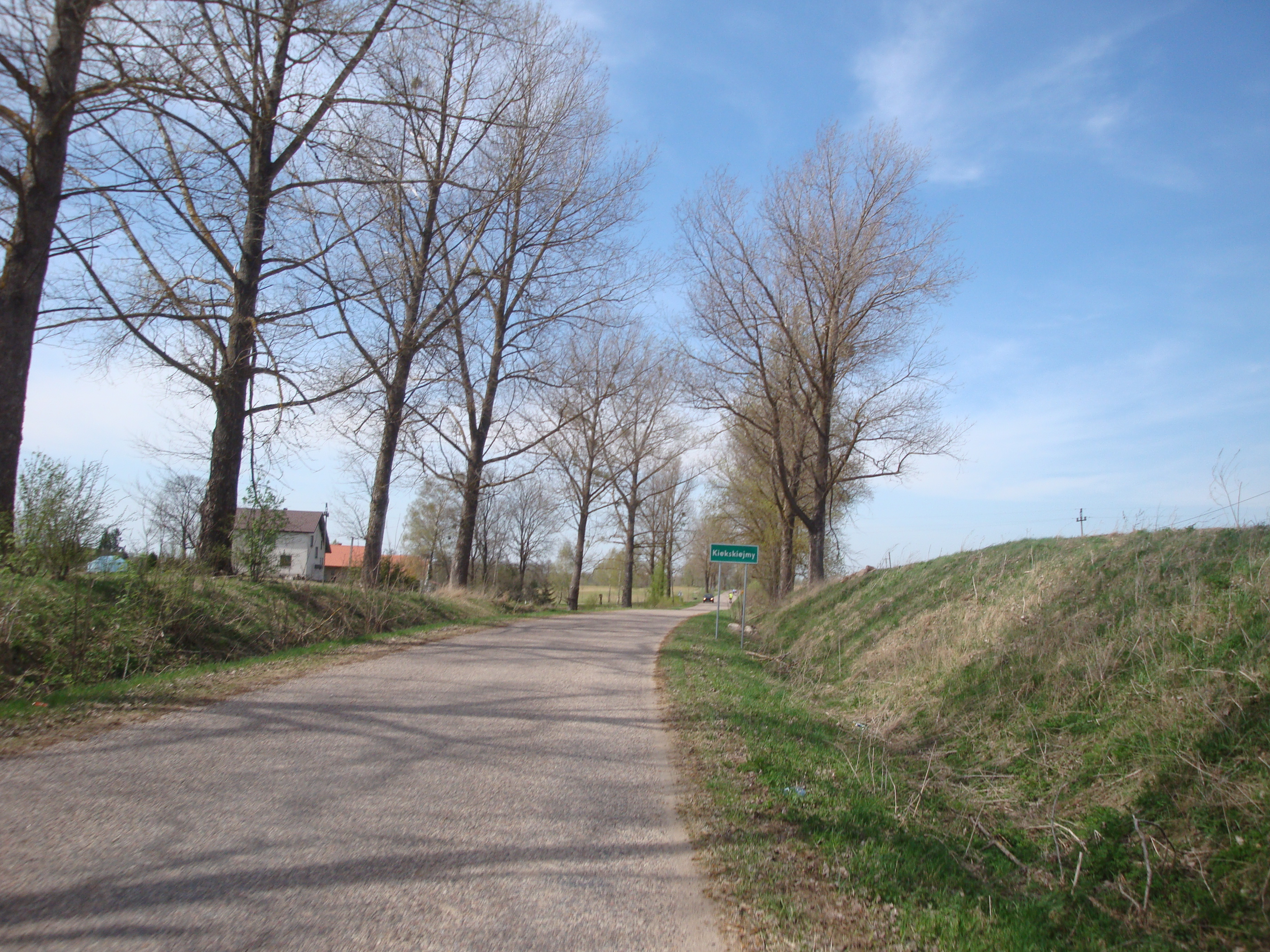

- Location within Poland
- Coordinates: 54°20′22″N 22°44′15″E
- Country: Poland
- Voivodeship: Warmian-Masurian
- County: Gołdap
- Gmina: Dubeninki
- Population: 194

Kiekskiejmy [kʲɛksˈkʲɛi̯mɨ] is a village in the administrative district of Gmina Dubeninki, within Gołdap County, Warmian-Masurian Voivodeship, in northern Poland, close to the border with the Kaliningrad Oblast of Russia.
