= Przerośl Gołdapska =

- Village
- Location within Poland
- Coordinates: 54°17′N 22°37′E
- Country: Poland
- Voivodeship: Warmian-Masurian
- County: Gołdap
- Gmina: Dubeninki

Population
  - Total: 119
- Time zone: UTC+1 (CET)
  - Summer (DST): UTC+2 (CEST)
- Vehicle registration: NGO

Przerośl Gołdapska [ˈpʂɛrɔɕl ɡɔu̯ˈdapska] is a village in the administrative district of Gmina Dubeninki, within Gołdap County, Warmian-Masurian Voivodeship, in northern Poland, close to the border with the Kaliningrad Oblast of Russia. It is located in Masuria.
