= Vištytis (lake) =

Lake on the Lithuania-Russia border

Lake Vištytis
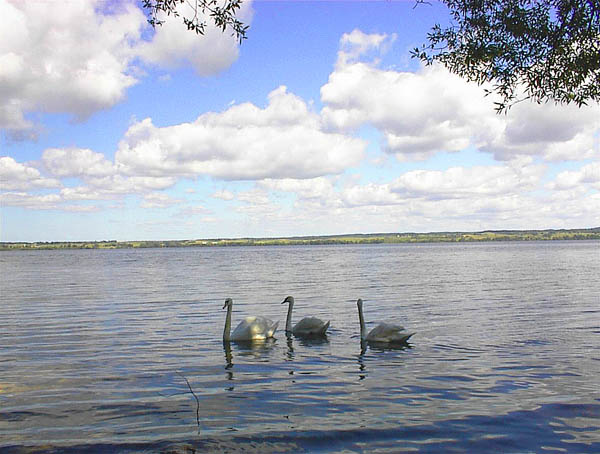
- View from Russian side to the Lithuanian shore

- Location within Lithuania
- Interactive map of Lake Vištytis
- Coordinates: 54°26′N 22°44′E
- Primary outflows: Pissa
- Basin countries: Lithuania, Russia
- Max. length: 8 km (5.0 mi)
- Max. width: 4.2 km (2.6 mi)
- Surface area: 17.83 km^{2} (6.88 sq mi)
- Average depth: 15.5 m (51 ft)
- Max. depth: 54 m (177 ft)
- Water volume: .258 km^{3} (0.062 cu mi)
- Surface elevation: 172.4 m (566 ft)
- Settlements: Vištytis

Lake Vištytis (Note: Lithuanian: Vištyčio ežeras, German: Wystiter See, Russian: Виштыне́цкое о́зеро, romanized: Vishtynetskoye ozero) is a lake on the border between Lithuania (Vilkaviškis district) and Russia (Kaliningrad Oblast), near the tripoint with Poland.

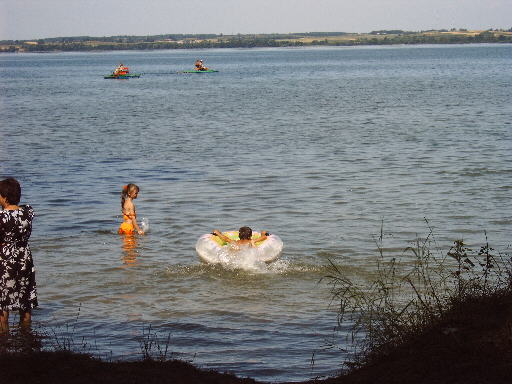
Bathing on the Russian side

The small Lithuanian town of Vištytis on the northern shore was named after the lake. In the west, the extended Romincka Forest stretches along the Russian-Polish border. On the Lithuanian side, the lake and its environs are part of a protected area named Vištytis Regional Park. The lake has 15 inflows, but only one river, the Pissa, tributary to Pregolya, flows from this lake.

Lake Vištytis covers an area of 17.83 km^{2} (6.88 sq mi), of which 5.44 km^{2} (2.10 sq mi) belongs to Lithuania. This is a marked increase over 0.4 km^{2} (0.15 sq mi) that belonged to Lithuania before ratification of a Russian–Lithuanian border treaty in 2003. On occasion, high winds or broken equipment can force tourist boats to the opposite western shore. Even if unintentional, such incidents constitute illegal border crossings and can lead to sanctions from the border guards. Before the 2003 treaty, the border ran along the waterline of the beaches on the Lithuanian side, so anyone paddling in the water was technically crossing into Russia. Sometimes the lake is used for smuggling goods, usually cigarettes, across the border.

Prior to World War II, the lake formed part of the border between the German province of East Prussia and Lithuania.
