= Budwiecie, Warmian-Masurian Voivodeship =

Budwiecie
- Village
- Location within Poland
- Coordinates: 54°19′N 22°31′E
- Country: Poland
- Voivodeship: Warmian-Masurian
- County: Gołdap
- Gmina: Dubeninki
- Population: 120

Budwiecie ([budˈvjɛt͡ɕɛ]; German: Budweitschen, 1938–1945 Elsgrund; Lithuanian: Būdviečiai) is a village in the administrative district of Gmina Dubeninki, within Gołdap County, Warmian-Masurian Voivodeship, in northern Poland, close to the border with the Kaliningrad Oblast of Russia.
