= Linowo, Gołdap County =

Linowo
- Village
- Location within Poland
- Coordinates: 54°17′32″N 22°36′55″E
- Country: Poland
- Voivodeship: Warmian-Masurian
- County: Gołdap
- Gmina: Dubeninki
- Population: 62

Linowo ([liˈnɔvɔ]; German: Linnawen, 1938–45 Linnau) is a village in the administrative district of Gmina Dubeninki, within Gołdap County, Warmian-Masurian Voivodeship, in northern Poland, close to the border with the Kaliningrad Oblast of Russia.
