= Puszcza Romincka Landscape Park =

Protected area in Poland

- Park Krajobrazowy Puszczy Rominckiej
- IUCN category V (protected landscape/seascape)
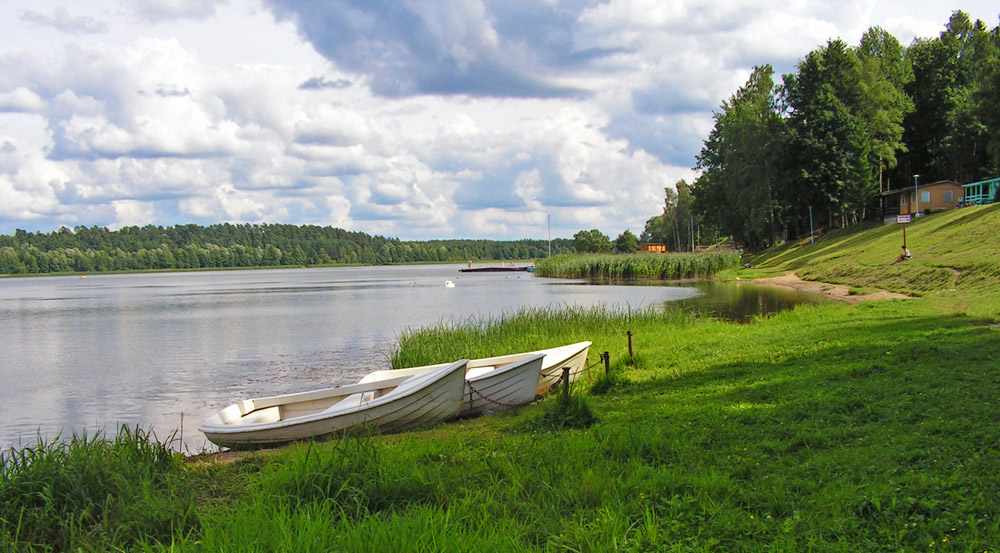
- Interactive map of Puszcza Romincka Landscape Park
- Location: Warmian-Masurian Voivodeship
- Coordinates: 54°19′10″N 22°32′11″E
- Area: 146.2 km^{2} (56.4 sq mi)
- Established: 1998

Puszcza Romincka Landscape Park (Park Krajobrazowy Puszczy Rominckiej) is a protected area (Landscape Park) in northern Poland, established in 1998, covering an area of 146.2 square kilometres (56.4 sq mi). It takes its name from the Puszcza Romincka or Romincka Forest.

The Park lies within Warmian-Masurian Voivodeship, in Gołdap County (Gmina Gołdap, Gmina Dubeninki).

Within the Landscape Park are six nature reserves.
