= Skajzgiry =

- Village
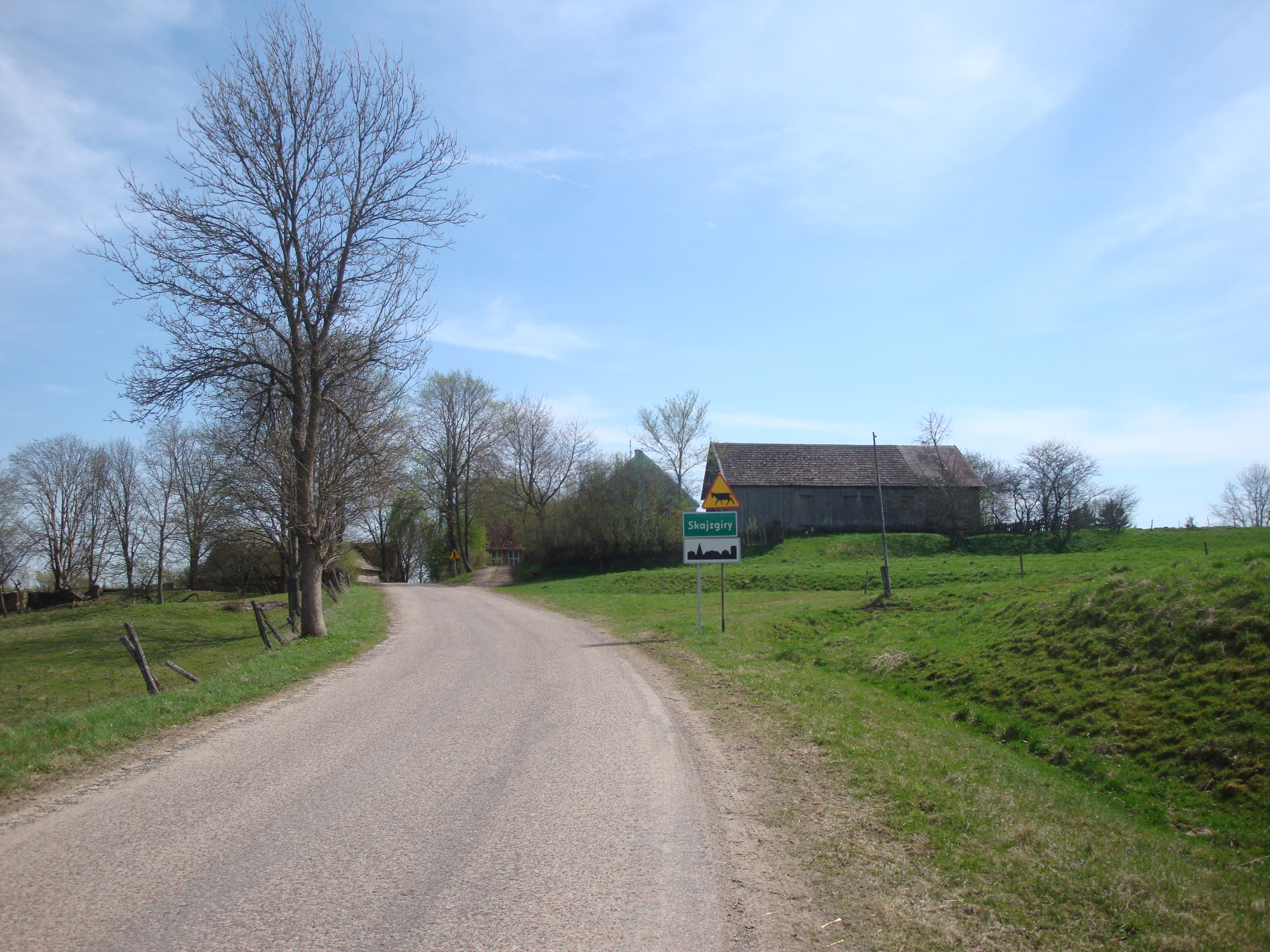

- Location within Poland
- Coordinates: 54°20′N 22°42′E
- Country: Poland
- Voivodeship: Warmian-Masurian
- County: Gołdap
- Gmina: Dubeninki

Skajzgiry [skai̯zˈɡirɨ] (German Skaisgirren) is a village in the administrative district of Gmina Dubeninki, within Gołdap County, Warmian-Masurian Voivodeship, in northern Poland, close to the border with the Kaliningrad Oblast of Russia.
