= Będziszewo =

- Village
- Location within Poland
- Coordinates: 54°18′N 22°37′E
- Country: Poland
- Voivodeship: Warmian-Masurian
- County: Gołdap
- Gmina: Dubeninki
- Elevation: 46 m (151 ft)
- Population: 43

Będziszewo ([bɛnd͡ʑiˈʂɛvɔ]; German: Padingkehmen, 1938–1945 Padingen) is a village in the administrative district of Gmina Dubeninki, within Gołdap County, Warmian-Masurian Voivodeship, in northern Poland, close to the border with the Kaliningrad Oblast of Russia.
