= Marlinowo =

- Village
- Location within Poland
- Coordinates: 54°16′N 22°29′E
- Country: Poland
- Voivodeship: Warmian-Masurian
- County: Gołdap
- Gmina: Dubeninki
- Founded: 1580
- Time zone: UTC+1 (CET)
  - Summer (DST): UTC+2 (CEST)
- Vehicle registration: NGO

Marlinowo [marliˈnɔvɔ] is a village in the administrative district of Gmina Dubeninki, within Gołdap County, Warmian-Masurian Voivodeship, in north-eastern Poland, close to the border with the Kaliningrad Oblast of Russia.

The village was founded in 1580. It was historically known in Polish both as Marlinowo and Dudki.
