= Gmina Dubeninki =

Gmina Dubeninki Dubeninki Commune
- Gmina
- Interactive map of Gmina Dubeninki
- Coordinates (Dubeninki): 54°17′3″N 22°33′54″E
- Country: Poland
- Voivodeship: Warmian-Masurian
- County: Gołdap
- Seat: Dubeninki

Area
  - Total: 205.18 km^{2} (79.22 sq mi)

Population (2006)
  - Total: 3,151
  - Density: 15.36/km^{2} (39.78/sq mi)
- Website: http://www.dubeninki.pl/

Gmina Dubeninki is a rural gmina (administrative district) in Gołdap County, Warmian-Masurian Voivodeship, in northern Poland, on the border with Russia. Its seat is the village of Dubeninki, which lies approximately 17 kilometres (11 mi) east of Gołdap and 146 km (91 mi) east of the regional capital Olsztyn.

The gmina covers an area of 205.18 square kilometres (79.2 sq mi), and as of 2006 its total population is 3,151.

The gmina contains part of the protected area called Puszcza Romincka Landscape Park.

== Villages ==
Gmina Dubeninki contains the villages and settlements of Barcie, Będziszewo, Białe Jeziorki, Błąkały, Błędziszki, Bludzie Małe, Bludzie Wielkie, Boczki, Budwiecie, Cisówek, Czarne, Degucie, Dubeninki, Golubie, Golubie Male, Kiekskiejmy, Kiepojcie, Kociołki, Kramnik, Lenkupie, Linowo, Łoje, Łysogóra, Maciejowięta, Markowo, Marlinowo, Meszno, Orliniec, Ostrowo, Pluszkiejmy, Pobłędzie, Przerośl Gołdapska, Przesławki, Rakówek, Redyki, Rogajny, Skajzgiry, Stańczyki, Sumowo, Tuniszki, Wobały, Wysoki Garb, Żabojady, Zawiszyn, Żerdziny and Żytkiejmy.

== Neighbouring gminas ==
Gmina Dubeninki is bordered by the gminas of Filipów, Gołdap, Przerośl and Wiżajny. It also borders Russia (Kaliningrad oblast).
