= Lenkupie =

- Village
- Location within Poland
- Coordinates: 54°21′23″N 22°43′47″E
- Country: Poland
- Voivodeship: Warmian-Masurian
- County: Gołdap
- Gmina: Dubeninki
- Population: 90

Lenkupie [lɛnˈkupjɛ] is a village in the administrative district of Gmina Dubeninki, within Gołdap County, Warmian-Masurian Voivodeship, in northern Poland, close to the border with the Kaliningrad Oblast of Russia.
