= Barcie, Warmian-Masurian Voivodeship =

Barcie
- Village
- Location within Poland
- Coordinates: 54°17′11″N 22°35′20″E
- Country: Poland
- Voivodeship: Warmian-Masurian
- County: Gołdap
- Gmina: Dubeninki

Barcie ([ˈbart͡ɕɛ]; German: Thewelkehmen, 1938–1945 Tulkeim; Lithuanian: Tėvelkiemis) is a village in the administrative district of Gmina Dubeninki, within Gołdap County, Warmian-Masurian Voivodeship, in northern Poland, it is close to the border with the Kaliningrad Oblast of Russia.
