= Łoje, Gołdap County =

Łoje
- Village
- Location within Poland
- Coordinates: 54°17′N 22°36′E
- Country: Poland
- Voivodeship: Warmian-Masurian
- County: Gołdap
- Gmina: Dubeninki
- Time zone: UTC+1 (CET)
  - Summer (DST): UTC+2 (CEST)
- Vehicle registration: NGO

Łoje [ˈwɔjɛ] is a village in the administrative district of Gmina Dubeninki, within Gołdap County, Warmian-Masurian Voivodeship, in northern Poland, close to the border with the Kaliningrad Oblast of Russia.

As of 1857, the village had a population of 200.
