= Bludzie Wielkie =

- Village
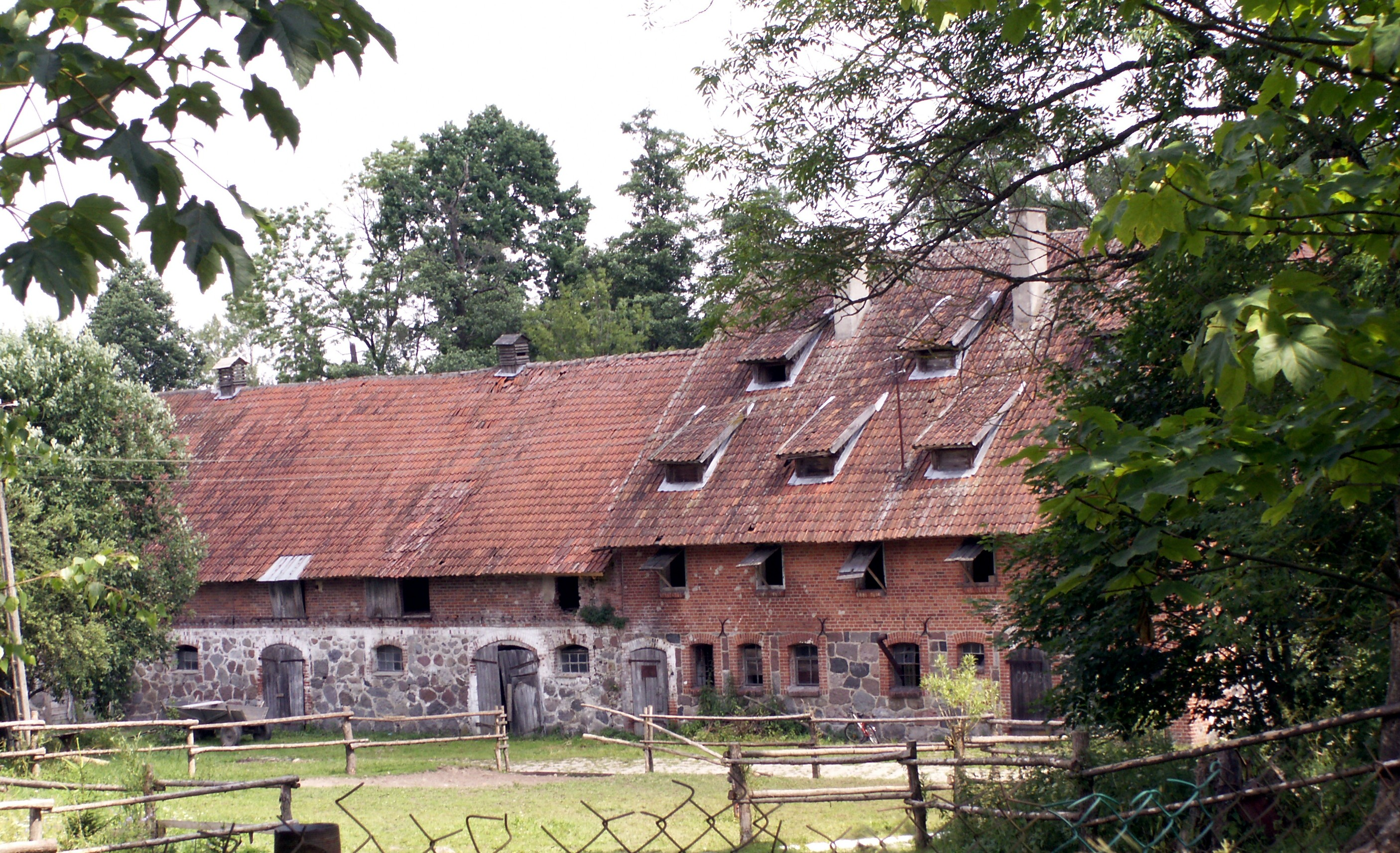

- Location within Poland
- Coordinates: 54°18′39″N 22°34′28″E
- Country: Poland
- Voivodeship: Warmian-Masurian
- County: Gołdap
- Gmina: Dubeninki
- Time zone: UTC+1 (CET)
  - Summer (DST): UTC+2 (CEST)
- Vehicle registration: NGO

Bludzie Wielkie ([ˈblud͡ʑɛ ˈvjɛlkʲɛ]; German: Groß Bludszen; 1938–1945 Forsthausen) is a village in the administrative district of Gmina Dubeninki, within Gołdap County, Warmian-Masurian Voivodeship, in north-eastern Poland, close to the border with the Kaliningrad Oblast of Russia.
