= Golubie, Gołdap County =

Golubie
- Village
- Location within Poland
- Coordinates: 54°17′28″N 22°43′4″E
- Country: Poland
- Voivodeship: Warmian-Masurian
- County: Gołdap
- Gmina: Dubeninki
- Elevation: 260 m (850 ft)
- Population: 314

Golubie [ɡɔˈlubjɛ] is a village in the administrative district of Gmina Dubeninki, within Gołdap County, Warmian-Masurian Voivodeship, in northern Poland, close to the border with the Kaliningrad Oblast of Russia.
