= Markowo, Gołdap County =

Markowo
- Village
- Location within Poland
- Coordinates: 54°18′44″N 22°31′31″E
- Country: Poland
- Voivodeship: Warmian-Masurian
- County: Gołdap
- Gmina: Dubeninki

Markowo [marˈkɔvɔ] is a village in the administrative district of Gmina Dubeninki, within Gołdap County, Warmian-Masurian Voivodeship, in northern Poland, close to the border with the Kaliningrad Oblast of Russia.
