= Reichsjägerhof Rominten =

Hermann Göring's Hunting Lodge

Coordinates: 54°22′50″N 22°31′16″E

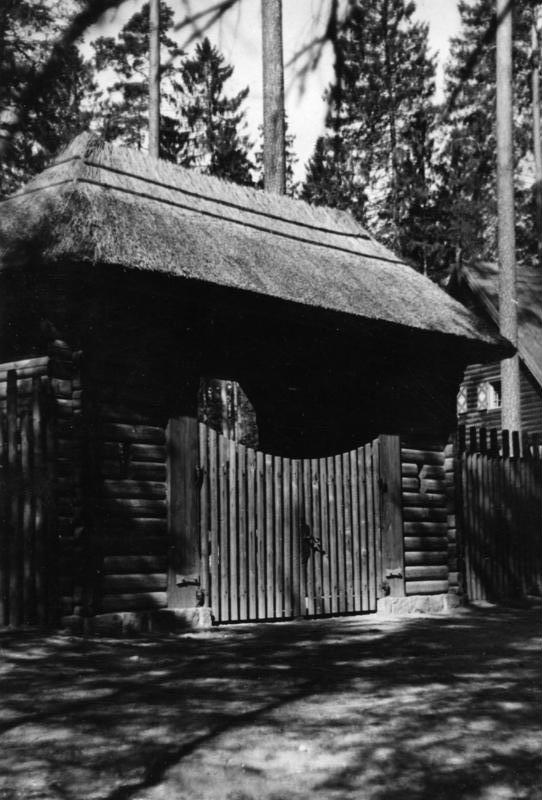
Entrance and Guardhouse, 1941

The Reichsjägerhof Rominten was Luftwaffe Commander-in-Chief Hermann Göring's hunting Lodge in the Rominter Heath (Russian: Krasny Les; Красный лес; Polish: Puszcza Romincka) in East Prussia. After the German attack on the Soviet Union, it temporarily served as Göring's headquarters.

== History ==
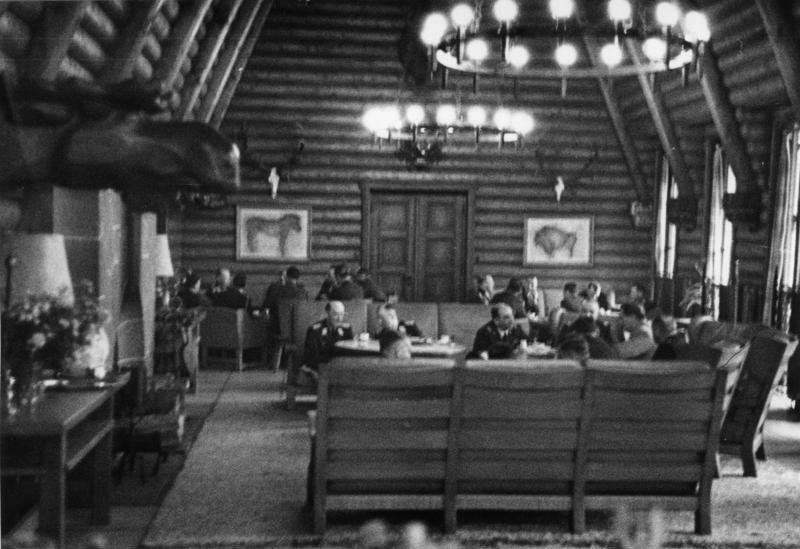
Interior view, 1936

The Rominter Heath had a long tradition as a Royal Hunting ground in East Prussia. From 1890 to 1913 Kaiser Wilhelm II had visited the Heath annually, since 1891 Wilhelm owned the Rominten Hunting Lodge. In September 1933 Wilhelm refused to allow Hermann Göring to stay in the lodge, subsequently Göring built his own lodge (after Wilhelm's death Göring forced the heirs to sell the Royal lodge to him).

In September 1935, Göring authorized the construction of a hunting lodge in the Rominter Heath, which was completed in September 1936. Initially Göring planned to name the complex after his second wife Emmy "Emmyhall" like he did at Carinhall in the Schorfheide after his first wife. However the complex was named "Reichsjägerhof Rominten" similar to the "Reichsjägerhof Hermann Göring" near Braunschweig. The attached game reserve extended nearly 100 square miles (260 km^{2}).

After the German attack on the Soviet Union, the complex temporarily served as Göring's headquarters. With the Soviet advance on East Prussia, Göring ordered the destruction of the Reichsjägerhof and on 20 October 1944 the whole complex was set on fire by Göring's custodian.

After World War II, the region became part of the Soviet Union. As of 2013 some Russian investors are planning to reconstruct the complex.
