= Boczki, Warmian-Masurian Voivodeship =

Boczki
- Village
- Location within Poland
- Coordinates: 54°18′39″N 22°34′28″E
- Country: Poland
- Voivodeship: Warmian-Masurian
- County: Gołdap
- Gmina: Dubeninki

Boczki [ˈbɔt͡ʂki] is a village in the administrative district of Gmina Dubeninki, within Gołdap County, in the Warmian-Masurian Voivodeship, in northern Poland. The village is close to the border with the Kaliningrad Oblast of Russia.
