= Błędziszki =

- Village
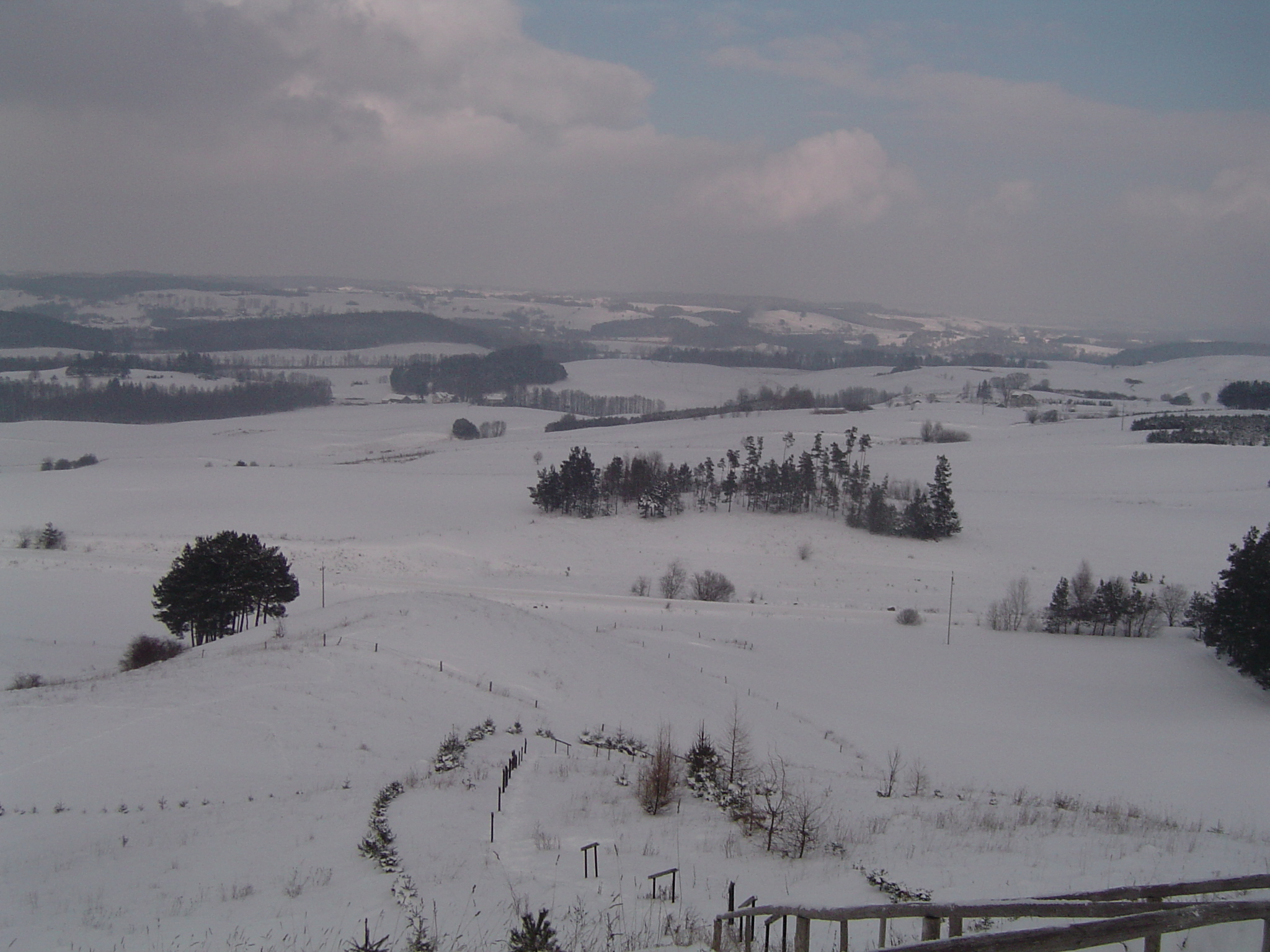
- Landscape of Błędziszki and vicinity

- Location within Poland
- Coordinates: 54°19′N 22°38′E
- Country: Poland
- Voivodeship: Warmian-Masurian
- County: Gołdap
- Gmina: Dubeninki
- Population: 32

Błędziszki ([bwɛnˈd͡ʑiʂki]; German: Blindischken, 1938–1945 Wildwinkel) is a village in the administrative district of Gmina Dubeninki, within Gołdap County, Warmian-Masurian Voivodeship, in northern Poland, close to the border with the Kaliningrad Oblast of Russia.
