= Romincka Forest =

Forest in Poland and Russia

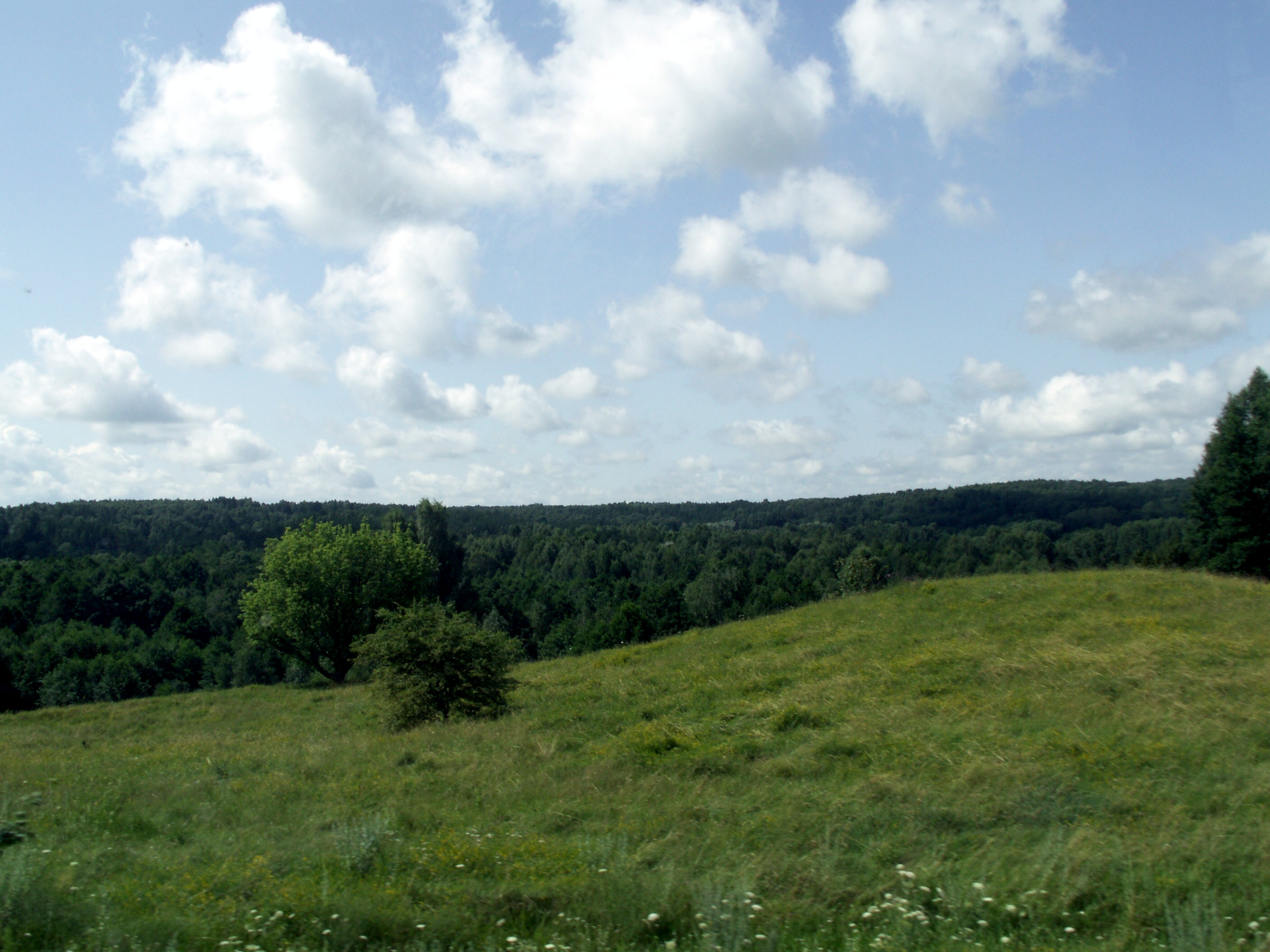
- Romincka Forest

- Location within Poland Location within Kaliningrad Oblast
- Interactive map of Romincka Forest

Geography
- Location: Poland, Russia
- Coordinates: 54°22′18″N 22°31′17″E
- Area: 250 km^{2} (100 mi^{2})

Romincka Forest (Polish: Puszcza Romincka, Lithuanian: Romintos giria), also known as Krasny Les (Russian: Красный лес) or Rominte Heath (German: Rominter Heide), is an extended forest and heath landscape stretching from the southeast of Russian Kaliningrad Oblast to the northeast of Polish Warmian-Masurian Voivodeship.

== Etymology ==
The Polish and German names of the forest, like the Rominta/Rominte river and the settlement of Rominty/Rominten, are derived from the Lithuanian syllable rom, meaning calm. The Russian name, Krasnyy Les, means "Red Forest".

== Geography ==
The total area of the Romincka landscape is about 250 square kilometres (97 sq mi), stretching from the Masurian Lake District in the southwest up to the border with Lithuania at Lake Vištytis in the east. The southern Polish part (about one-third of the area) comprises a protected zone known as Puszcza Romincka Landscape Park. The forest is located in the transitional area between the regions of Masuria and Lithuania Minor.

The Krasnaya River flows through the Romincka Forest. Major settlements in the area include Krasnolesye in Kaliningrad Oblast, as well as Żytkiejmy and Gołdap in Poland.

== Flora ==
The forest is part of the Central European mixed forests ecoregion. Trees in the Polish part of the forest are 40% spruce, 22% oak, 19% pine, 11% birch, 6% alder, and 2% linden and other species. Common plant communities include Tilio-Carpinetum forest on dry ground, composed of oak, spruce, linden, ash, alder, maple, elm, hornbeam, and birch. Undergrowth is generally sparse. Fraxino-Alnetum forest is found in marshy areas, with alder, spruce, linden, ash, and, less frequently, elm. Understory shrubs include bird cherry (Prunus padus), hazel, guelder rose, and saplings of canopy trees. Ground-elder (Aegopodium podagraria) and nettle (Urtica dioica) are common in the ground layer.

== History ==
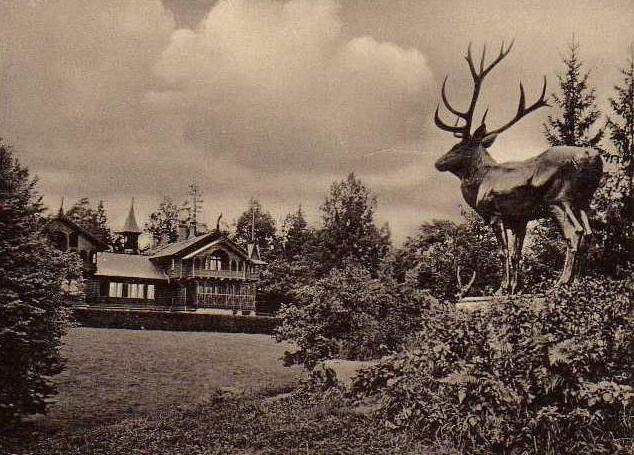
Rominten hunting lodge, 1914 postcard

The extended forests were known for their red deer populations and became a popular hunting ground of the Hohenzollern princes who ruled the Duchy of Prussia from 1525, until 1657 as part of the Kingdom of Poland. Part of the German Empire from 1871 onwards, a vast estate in Romincka Forest was purchased by Emperor Wilhelm II, who had his Rominten Hunting Lodge, including a chapel dedicated to Saint Hubertus, erected here in 1891. Hunt scenes were portrayed by notable painters such as Richard Friese (1854–1918).

Plundered by Russian forces in World War I, the hunting lodge and grounds were administered by the Free State of Prussia on Wilhelm's abdication in 1918; Minister-President Otto Braun was a regular guest. Later on, the estates were seized by Nazi minister Hermann Göring, whose Reichsjägerhof Rominten was built nearby in 1936. It also served as Göring's headquarters during the German Operation Barbarossa in 1941.

The Allied Potsdam Agreement after World War II divided the region between the re-established Polish Republic and the Soviet Union. The German history of the region is documented at the East Prussian Regional Museum in Lüneburg and at the German Hunting and Fishing Museum in Munich. In recent years, hunting tourism has again become popular.

== Cuisine ==
The officially protected traditional food of the area is sękacz z Puszczy Rominckiej, a local type of sękacz, a traditional cake of north-eastern Poland (as designated by the Ministry of Agriculture and Rural Development of Poland).
