= Rominten Hunting Lodge =

East Prussian residence of Kaiser Wilhelm II

Coordinates: 54°21′45″N 22°32′16″E

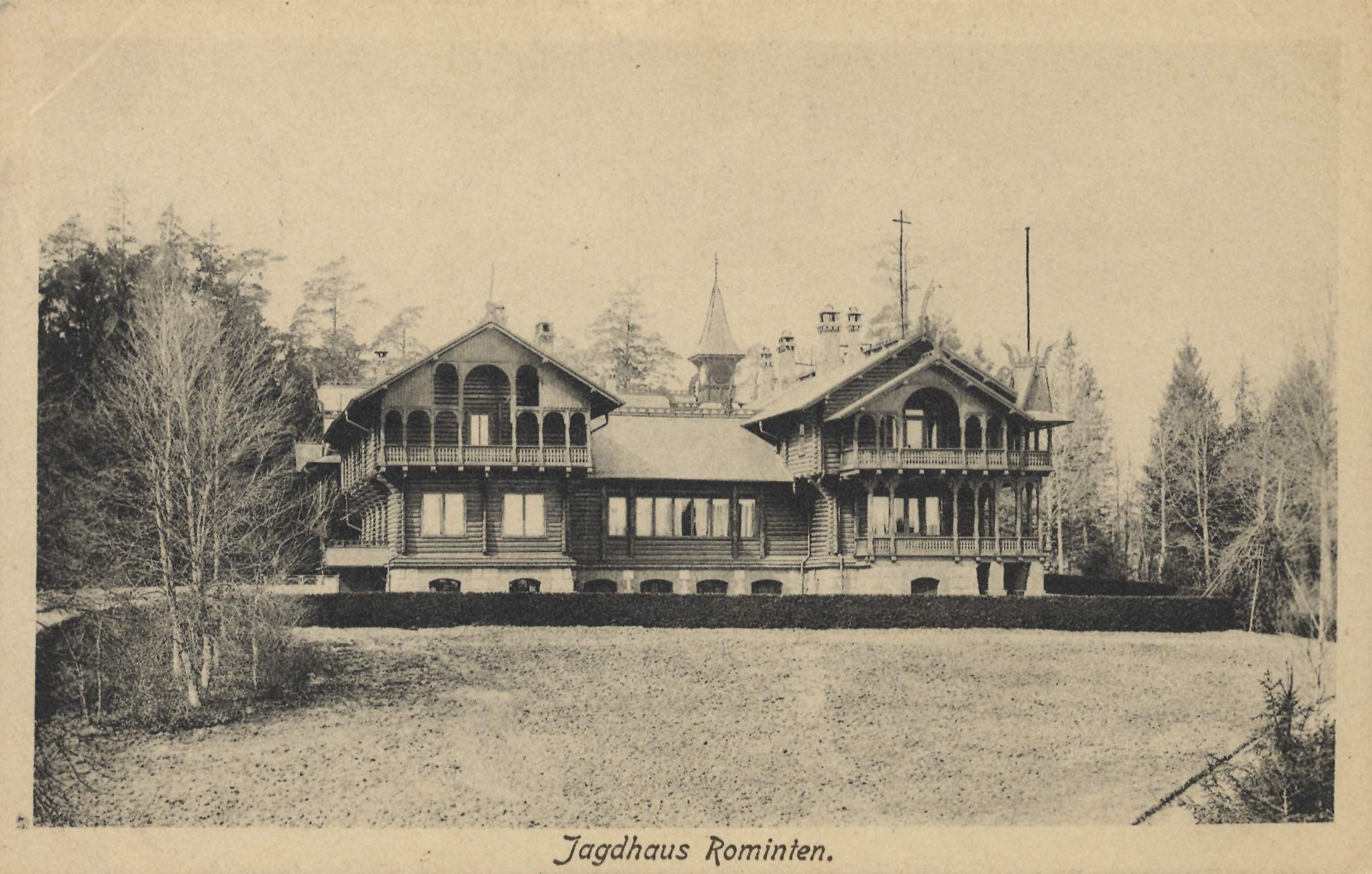
Rominten Hunting Lodge: a postcard view from about 1916

The Rominten Hunting Lodge (German: Jagdschloss Rominten) was the residence of Kaiser Wilhelm II in the Rominter Heath in East Prussia.

== History ==
The electoral Hunting Lodge of Rominten ("Kurfürstliche Jagdbude Rominten") was first mentioned in historical records in 1572. In 1674, a new lodge was built, as the old one had fallen into disrepair. By the late 19th century, neither lodge was in existence; all that remained was a small forestry workers' settlement, a tavern and a forester's office.

Prince Friedrich Karl of Prussia rediscovered the Rominter Heath as a potential hunting ground. Kaiser Wilhelm II first visited the Heath in 1890 and decided to build a Royal Hunting Lodge at Theerbude (lit: Tarhut). The building was constructed by Norwegian workers to a Norwegian Dragestil design, following plans drawn up by Holm Hansen Munthe and Ole Sverre. The materials were also imported from Norway. The Kaiser first stayed at the new lodge in autumn 1891.

A small Norwegian Stave Church-style chapel dedicated to Saint Hubertus (the patron saint of hunting) was built in 1893, and Theerbude was renamed "Kaiserlich Rominten" (Imperial Rominten) on 13 September 1897. Over the following years, a youth hostel and an orphanage were built, and the village became a popular tourist resort. An "Empress-wing" was added to the lodge in 1904.

Wilhelm II spent several weeks each fall at Rominten and at his other retreats in Prökelwitz and Hubertusstock. Rominten had the distinction of being the place where he and his ministers made the most important decisions regarding improvements to the navy and ship-building. Government ministers would travel out to the lodge from Berlin. Most of Wilhelm's time at Rominten, however, was spent hunting. He and his entourage would rise at 5:00 each morning and be driven out to the forest. Standing on special platforms, they would wait for herders to drive deer and elk toward their positions.

From 22 September to 2 October 1913, Wilhelm II visited the lodge for the last time. In his 23 years of hunting on the Rominter Heath, he had brought down 327 deer.

After World War I, the Lodge remained the private property of Wilhelm II, although the exiled Kaiser would never return to Rominten. In September 1933, Wilhelm refused to allow Hermann Göring to stay in the lodge; Göring subsequently built his own Reichsjägerhof Rominten just a few miles away, with a game reserve extending nearly 100 square miles (260 km^{2}). After Wilhelm's death in 1941, Göring forced the heirs to sell the Rominten Hunting Lodge to the State of Prussia (of which Göring was Minister-President) for his own use.

After World War II, the region became part of the Soviet Union. The village was demolished and the lodge was re-erected in Kaliningrad's Central Park, to serve as the seat of the park administration. A bronze statue of a deer was moved to the Glinka Park in Smolensk; another deer statue was moved to Sosnovka near Moscow.

Today, the village no longer exists, as the area is located directly on the Polish–Russian border.

== Gallery ==
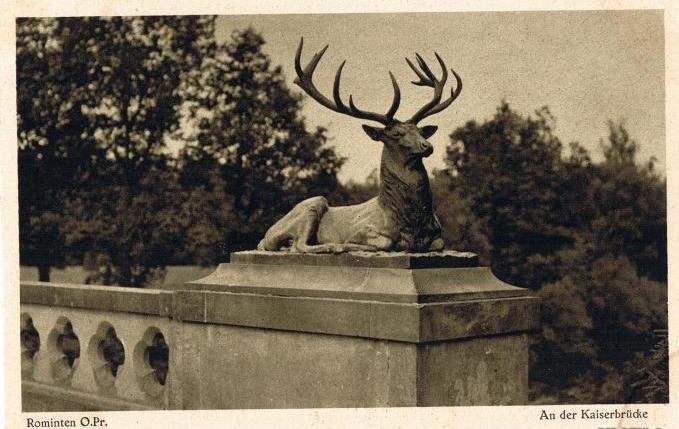
Rominten Hunting Lodge: the deer's bridge. The bronze deer was moved to Sosnovka near Moscow after World War II.

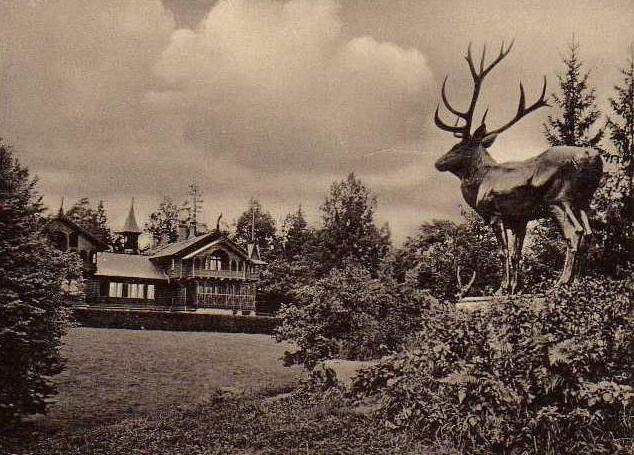
Rominten Hunting Lodge. The bronze deer was moved to Smolensk after World War II.

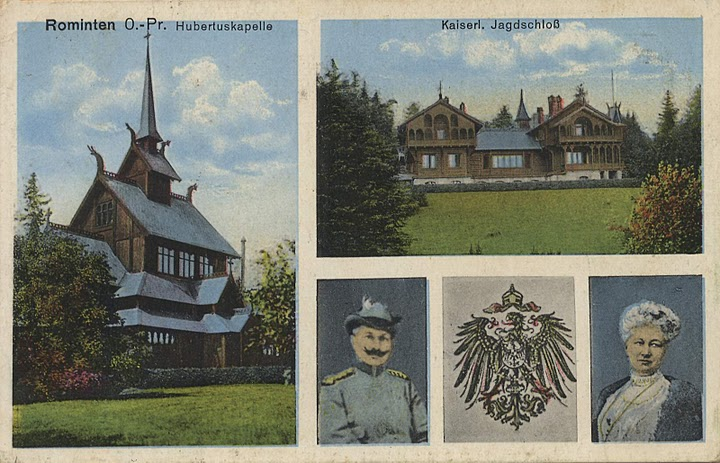
Rominten Hunting Lodge: a postcard view. The stave church is on the left.

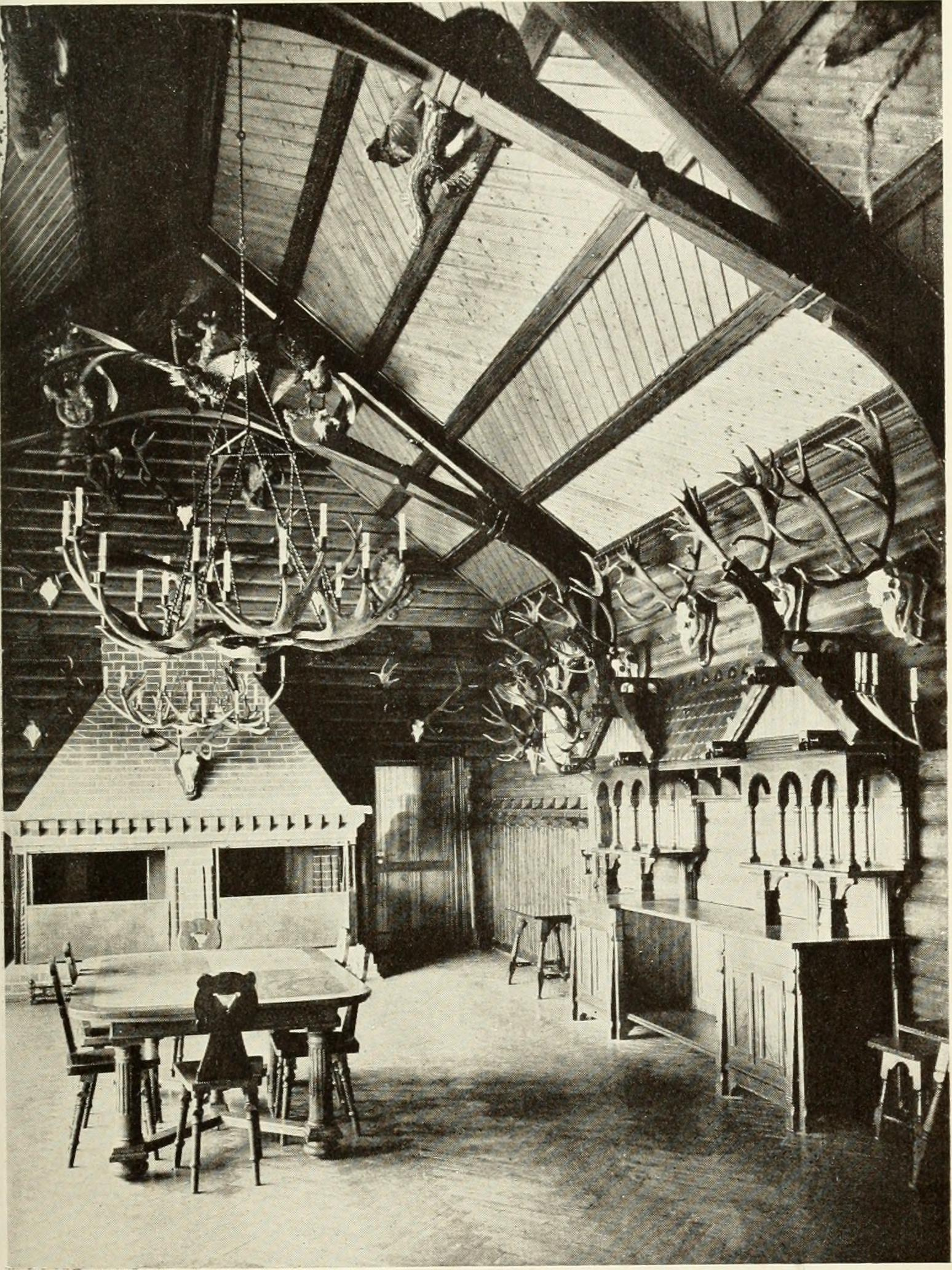
Interior of the lodge

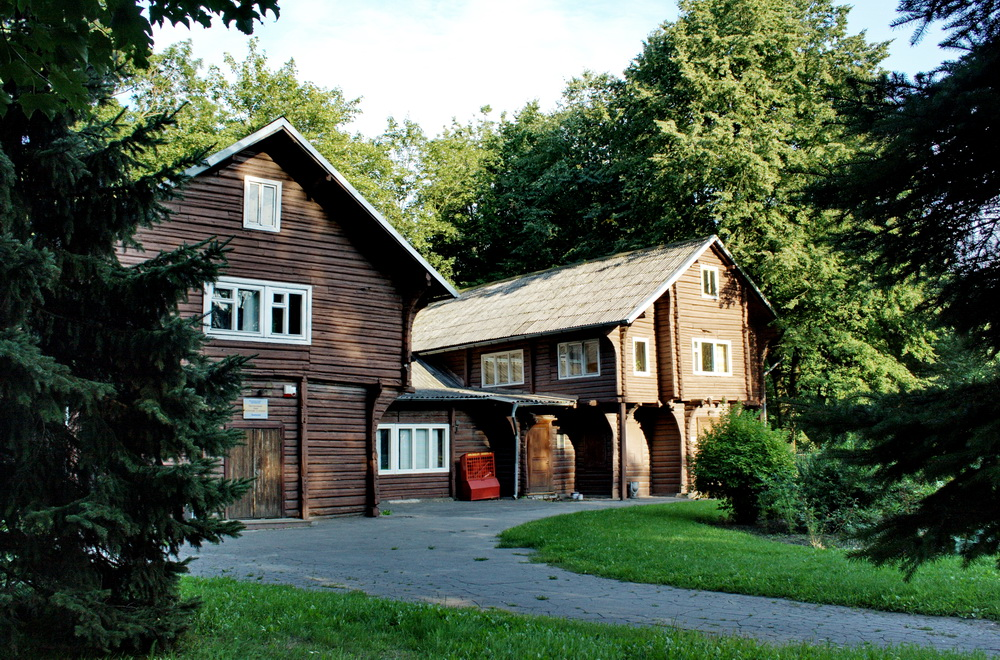
The lodge in its present condition (Kaliningrad, 2010)
