= Instruch =

Location
- Country: Russia

Physical characteristics
- Mouth
  - location: Pregolya
  - coordinates: 54°38′52″N 21°47′27″E

Basin features
- Progression: Pregolya→ Baltic Sea

The Instruch (Russian: Инструч; German: Inster; Lithuanian: Įsrutis, Įsra; Polish: Instrucz, Instruć or Wystruć) is a river in Russia's Kaliningrad Oblast. It begins northeast of Dobrovolsk and, along with the river Angrapa, forms the Pregolya near Chernyakhovsk.

Prior to 1945, the river was part of German East Prussia. The town of Insterburg (now Chernyakhovsk) was named after the river's German name, Inster.
