= Angrapa =

Angrapa Węgorapa
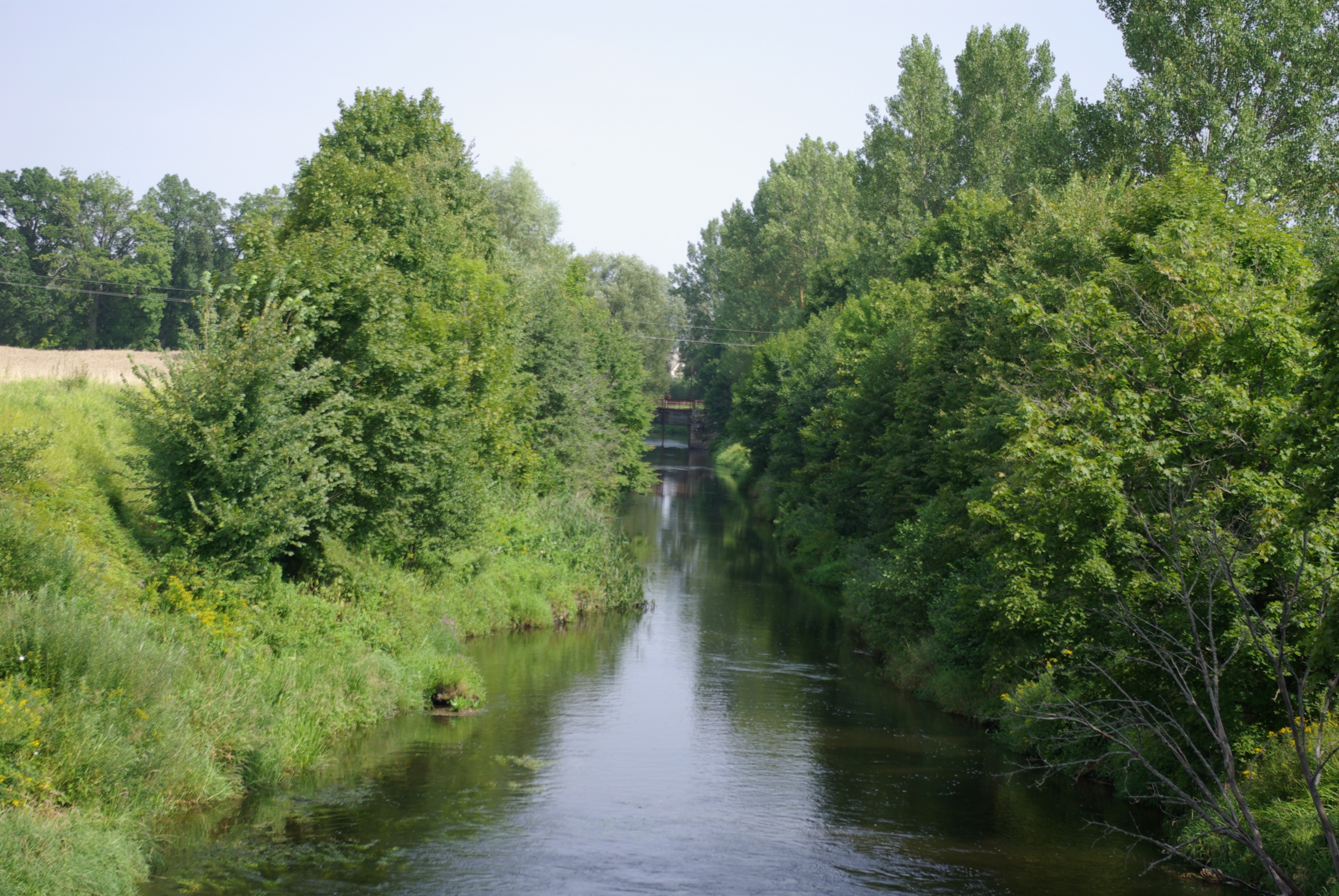
- The Angrapa River in Mieduniszki Wielkie, Poland

- Location of mouth in Russia

Location
- Country: Poland, Russia

Physical characteristics
- Source
  - location: Lake Mamry
  - coordinates: 54°11′51″N 21°43′07″E
- Mouth
  - location: Pregolya
  - coordinates: 54°38′52″N 21°47′29″E

Basin features
- Progression: Pregolya→ Baltic Sea

The Angrapa (Russian: Анграпа, Polish: Węgorapa, German: Angerapp, Lithuanian: Angrapė) is a river that begins in northeastern Poland and ends in the Kaliningrad Oblast of Russia. Originating in Lake Mamry, it joins the 101-km-long Instruch at a point near Chernyakhovsk – variously assessed as lying 140, 169, or 172 km from its source – to form the Pregolya. Its largest tributaries are the 89-km-long Gołdapa, which joins just before the border, and the Pissa (98 km).

The name Angrapa is derived from the Old Prussian words anguris (eel) and apis (river). The towns of Węgorzewo, Ozyorsk and Chernyakhovsk as well as the village of Mayakovskoye, are situated along the course of the Angrapa.

== State Water Register ==
The code of the river in the State Water Register is 01010000212104300010053.

== See also ==
- Rivers of Poland
- Rivers of Russia
- List of rivers of Europe
