= Żytkiejmy =

- Village
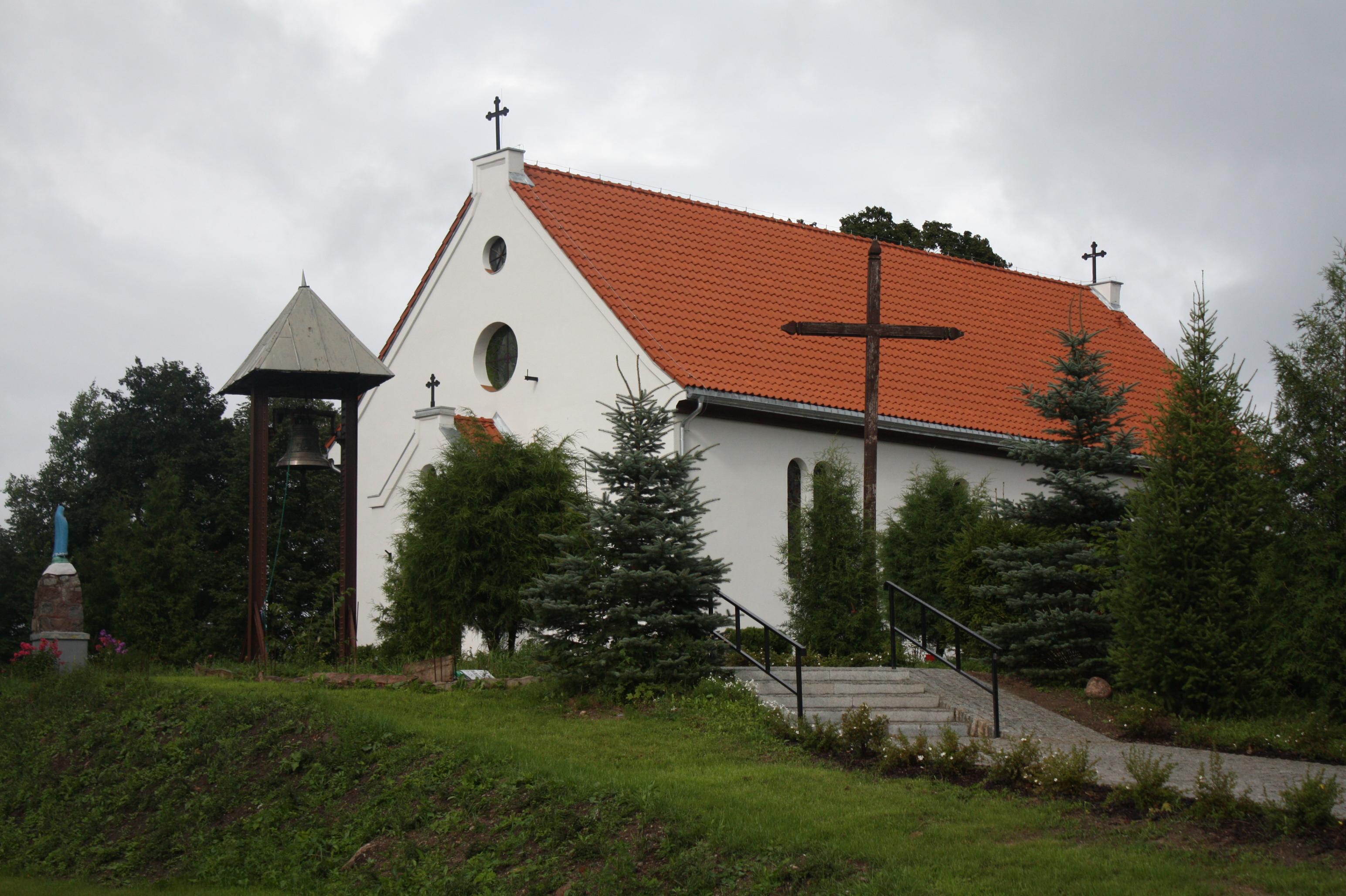
- Local church

- Location within Poland
- Coordinates: 54°20′N 22°41′E
- Country: Poland
- Voivodeship: Warmian-Masurian
- County: Gołdap
- Gmina: Dubeninki

Population
  - Total: 907
- Time zone: UTC+1 (CET)
  - Summer (DST): UTC+2 (CEST)
- Postal code: 19-505
- Vehicle registration: NG0

Żytkiejmy ([ʐɨtˈkʲɛi̯mɨ]; Lithuanian: Žydkiemis, literally Jewish courtyard) is a village in the administrative district of Gmina Dubeninki, within Gołdap County, Warmian-Masurian Voivodeship, in north-eastern Poland, close to the border with Lithuania and the Kaliningrad Oblast of Russia.

In the past, it was also known in Polish as Szytkiejmy.

Three annual fairs were held in the village in the late 19th century.
