= Pregolya =

River in Kaliningrad Oblast, Russia

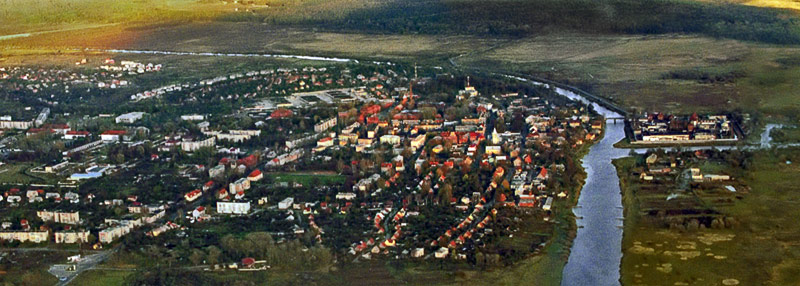
- The Pregolya in Gvardeysk

Location
- Country: Russia

Physical characteristics
- Source
  - location: Instruch and Angrapa confluence
- Mouth
  - location: Vistula Lagoon, Baltic Sea
  - coordinates: 54.6827°N 20.3778°E
- Basin size: 15,500 km^{2} (6,000 sq mi)
- Discharge
  - average: 90 m^{3}/s (3,200 cu ft/s)

The Pregolya or Pregola (Russian: Прего́ля; German: Pregel; Lithuanian: Prieglius; Polish: Pregoła) is a river in the Russian Kaliningrad Oblast exclave.

== Name ==
A possible ancient name by Ptolemy of the Pregolya River is Chronos (from Germanic *hrauna, "stony"), although other theories identify Chronos as a much larger river, the Nemunas.

The oldest recorded names of the river are Prigora (1302), Pregor (1359), Pregoll, Pregel (1331), Pregill (1460). Georg Gerullis connected the name with Lithuanian prãgaras, pragorė̃ ("abyss") and the Lithuanian verb gérti ("drink"). Vytautas Mažiulis instead derived it from spragė́ti or sprógti ("burst") and the suffix -ara ("river").

== Overview ==
It starts as a confluence of the Instruch and the Angrapa and drains into the Baltic Sea through the Vistula Lagoon. Its length under the name of Pregolya is 123 km, 292 km including the Angrapa. The basin has an area of 15,500 km^{2}. The average flow is 90 m^{3}/s.

Euler's Seven Bridges of Königsberg problem was based on the bridges crossing the river in Königsberg (now Kaliningrad).

== Cities and towns ==
- Chernyakhovsk
- Znamensk
- Gvardeysk
- Kaliningrad

== Tributaries ==
- Pissa
- Lava/Łyna
- Angrapa
- Instruch

== See also ==
- List of rivers of Russia
- Bridges of Konigsberg problem
