= Kreis Goldap =

District of Prussia

Coordinates: 54°18′58″N 22°18′34″E

Province of East Prussia (in 1905)

The Goldap district was a Prussian district in East Prussia that existed from 1818 to 1945. Its territory is now divided between the Polish Warmian-Masurian Voivodeship and the Russian Kaliningrad Oblast.

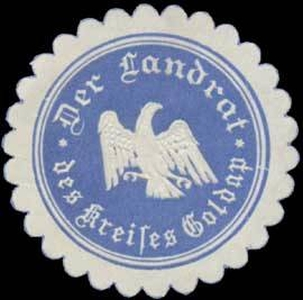
Seal mark of the district administrator with the coat of arms of the Free State of Prussia

== History ==
=== Kingdom of Prussia ===
On 1 September 1818 the new Goldap district was formed in Regierungsbezirk Gumbinnen from parts of the old Insterburg district. This included the parishes of Dubeningken, Gawaiten, Goldap, Grabowen, Gurnen, Mehlkehmen, Szirgupönen (from 1824) and Szittkehmen. The district office was in Goldap.

On 1 February 1843 a major exchange of territory took place between the district of Goldap and the district of Stallupönen. The parish of Mehlkehmen was transferred from the district of Goldap to the district of Stallupönen, and in return, the parish of Tollmingkehmen was transferred from the district of Stallupönen to the district of Goldap.

=== Germany ===
Since 1871, the district belonged to the German Empire. After the province of Prussia was divided into the provinces of East Prussia and West Prussia, the Goldap district became part of East Prussia on 1 April 1878.

In the spring of 1945 the district was occupied by the Red Army and in the summer of 1945, the Soviet occupation forces placed the southern part of the district including the district town of Goldap under Polish administration and the northern part under Soviet administration, in accordance with the Potsdam Agreement. The German population either fled or were subsequently expelled from the district by the local administrative authorities.

== Demographics ==
The Goldap district had a majority German population, with significant minorities of Poles and Lithuanians. The vast majority of the population (99.1% in 1849) was Protestant.

Population by ethnicity in the Goldap district
Year	1837		1849		1861	
Germans	25,516	80.5%	31,417	87.7%	37,584	91.2%
Poles	3,333	10.5%	2,358	6.6%	1,947	4.7%
Lithuanians	2,854	9.0%	2,047	5.7%	1,700	4.1%
Total	31,703		35,822		41,231	

== Politics ==
=== District Administrators ===
- 1818–1821:Steiner (provisional)
- 1821–1835:Gotthold Samuel Abraham Seemann (provisional)
- 1835–1855:Gustav Leopold Klein
- 1856–1864:Bruno von Schrötter (1816–1888)
- 1864–1877:Ludwig Ferdinand Hermann Siehr (1832–1885)
- 1877–1880:Bernhard Schopis († 1880)
- 1880:von Bornstedt (provisional)
- 1880–1884:Heinrich Cranz
- 1884–1889:Nikolaus von Werder (1856–1917)
- 1889–1902:Ernst Jachmann
- 1902–1906:Friedrich von Berg (1866–1939)
- 1906–1919:Philipp von Gehren
- 1919–1921:Herbert Rohde (1885–1975)
- 1921–1932:Hans Berner
- 1932–1945:Karl von Buchka (1885–1960)

=== Elections ===
In the German Empire, the district of Goldap, together with the districts of Darkehmen and Stallupönen, formed the constituency Gumbinnen 4.

== Municipalities ==
After the municipal reform of 1928, the Goldap district comprised the town of Goldap and 171 other municipalities until 1945:

- Abscherningken
- Altenbude
- Amberg
- Auxinnen
- Auxkallen
- Ballupönen, Parish Goldap
- Ballupönen, Parish Tollmingkehmen
- Barkehmen
- Billehnen
- Blindgallen
- Blindischken
- Bludßen
- Bodschwingken
- Budszedehlen
- Budweitschen, Parish Dubeningken
- Budweitschen, Parish Szittkehmen
- Buttkuhnen
- Czarnen
- Czerwonnen, Parish Goldap
- Dagutschen
- Dakehnen
- Deeden
- Didszullen
- Dobawen
- Dubeningken
- Duneyken
- Dzingellen
- Eckertsberg
- Egglenischken
- Elluschönen
- Eszergallen, Parish Dubeningken
- Eszergallen, Parish Gawaiten
- Flösten
- Friedrichowen
- Friedrichswalde
- Gawaiten
- Gehlweiden
- Gelleszuhnen
- Gerehlischken
- Glowken
- Goldap, town
- Gollubien
- Grabowen
- Grilskehmen
- Grischkehmen
- Groblischken
- Groß Dumbeln
- Groß Gudellen
- Groß Jesziorken
- Groß Kallweitschen
- Groß Kummetschen
- Groß Rominten
- Groß Rosinsko
- Groß Trakischken
- Groß Wronken
- Gulbenischken
- Gurnen
- Hegelingen
- Iszlaudszen
- Jagdbude
- Jagdhaus Rominten
- Jeblonsken
- Jessatschen
- Joddup
- Johannisberg
- Jörkischken
- Juckneitschen
- Jurgaitschen
- Kallnischken
- Kamionken
- Kaszeleken
- Kaszemeken
- Keppurdeggen
- Kiaunen
- Kiauten
- Klein Dumbeln
- Klein Gudellen
- Klein Kummetschen
- Klein Rosinsko
- Kögskehmen
- Kollnischken
- Kosaken
- Kosmeden
- Kowalken
- Kraginnen
- Kubillen
- Kuiken, Parish Goldap
- Kuiken, Parish Szittkehmen
- Kurnehnen
- Langensee
- Langkischken
- Lengkupchen
- Liegetrocken
- Linkischken
- Linnawen
- Loyen
- Loyken
- Makunischken
- Maleyken
- Marczinowen
- Marlinowen
- Matznorkehmen
- Matzutkehmen
- Meldienen
- Meschkrupchen
- Meszehnen
- Mlinicken
- Morathen
- Motzkuhnen
- Murgischken
- Ossöwen
- Oszeningken
- Pabbeln
- Pablindszen
- Padingkehmen
- Pallädszen
- Pellkawen
- Pelludszen
- Pickeln
- Pietraschen
- Plautzkehmen
- Plawischken
- Pöwgallen
- Präroszlehnen
- Präslauken
- Reddicken
- Regellen
- Reutersdorf
- Ribbenischken
- Rogainen
- Roponatschen
- Rothebude
- Rudzien
- Samonienen
- Satticken
- Sausleszowen
- Schackeln
- Schaltinnen
- Schillinnen
- Schlaugen
- Schuiken
- Serguhnen
- Serteggen
- Skaisgirren
- Skarupnen
- Skötschen
- Sokollen
- Staatshausen
- Stonupönen
- Stukatschen
- Stumbern
- Summowen
- Sutzken
- Szabojeden
- Szardeningken
- Szeeben
- Szeldkehmen
- Szielasken
- Szittkehmen
- Tartarren
- Texeln
- Thewelkehmen
- Theweln
- Tollmingkehmen
- Upidamischken
- Wannaginnen
- Warkallen
- Warnen
- Werxnen
- Wilkatschen
- Wyszupönen
- Zodszen

=== Municipalities dissolved before 1945 ===
- Czerwonnen, Parish Tollmingkehmen, on 30, September 1928 assigned to Pickeln
- Freiberg, on 30, September 1928 assigned to Eckertsberg
- Glasau, on 30, September 1928 assigned to Kowalken
- Groß Bludszen, on 30, September 1928 assigned to Bludßen
- Groß Duneyken, on 30, September 1928 assigned to Duneyken
- Groß Jodupp, on 30, September 1928 assigned to Jodupp
- Klein Jodupp, on 30, September 1928 assigned to Szeldkehmen
- Marienthal, in 1900 assigned to Johannisberg
- Martischken, on 30, September 1928 assigned to Ballupönen
- Mittel Jodupp, on 30, September 1928 assigned to Jodupp
- Naujehnen, on 30, September 1928 assigned to Kallnischken
- Pröken, on 30, September 1928 assigned to Gurnen
- Raudohnen, on 30, September 1928 assigned to Pickeln
- Uszupönen, on 30, September 1928 assigned to Eckertsberg
- Wiersbianken, on 30, September 1928 assigned to Duneyken

=== Place Names ===
From 1936 to 1938, the Nazis implemented extensive renaming of place names in the Goldap district, as in all of East Prussia, as many place names did not seem German enough for them. Some renaming had already taken place before 1936.

- Abscherningken: Ebershagen
- Auxinnen: Freudenau
- Auxkallen: Bergerode
- Babken: Steinbrück
- Ballupönen (Parish Goldap): Ballenau
- Ballupönen (Parish Tollmingkehmen): Wittigshöfen
- Barkehmen: Barkau
- Billehnen: Billenau
- Blindgallen: Schneegrund
- Blindischken: Wildwinkel
- Bludschen: Forsthausen
- Bodschwingken: Herandstal
- Bodschwingken Mühle: Herandstaler Mühle
- Budschedehlen: Salzburgerhütte
- Budweitschen (Parish Dubeningken): Elsgrund
- Budweitschen (Parish Schittkehmen): Altenwacht
- Buttkuhnen: Bodenhausen
- Collnischken: Burgfelde
- Czarnen: Scharnen
- Czerwonnen: Rotenau
- Dagutschen: Zapfengrund
- Dakehnen: Daken
- Didschullen: Schwadengeld
- Dobawen: Dobauen
- Dubeningken: Dubeningen
- Duneyken: Duneiken
- Duneyken, Forst: Duneiken, Forst
- Dzingellen: Widmannsdorf
- Egglenischken: Preußischnassau
- Elluschönen: Ellern (Ostpr.)
- Eszergallen/Eschergallen (Parish Dubeningken): Äschenbruch
- Eszergallen/Eschergallen (Parish Gawaiten): Tiefenort
- Flösten: Bornberg (Ostpr.)
- Friedrichowen: Friedrichau
- Gawaiten: Herzogsrode
- Gelleschuhnen: Gellenau (Ostpr.)
- Gerehlischken: Gerwalde
- Glowken: Thomasfelde
- Gollubien: Unterfelde
- Grabowen: Arnswald
- Grilskehmen: Grilsen
- Grischkehmen: Grischken
- Groblischken: Ringfelde
- Groß Bludszen/Bludschen: Forsthausen
- Groß Dumbeln: Erlensee
- Groß Gudellen: Großguden
- Groß Jesziorken: (since 1930) Schöntal
- Groß Kallweitschen: Kornberg
- Groß Kummetschen: Hermeshof
- Groß Rominten: Hardteck
- Groß Rosinsko: Großfreiendorf
- Groß Trakischken: Hohenrode (Ostpr.)
- Groß Wronken: Winterberg (Ostpr.)
- Gulbenischken: Gulbensee
- Jeblonsken: Urbansdorf
- Jessatschen: Grimbach
- Iszlaudszen: Schönheide (Ostpr.)
- Jodupp: Holzeck
- Jörkischken: Jarkental
- Juckneitschen: (since 1935) Steinhagen (Ostpr.)
- Jurgaitschen: Kleinau (Ostpr.)
- Kalkowen: Kalkau
- Kallnischken: Kunzmannsrode
- Kamionken: Eichicht
- Kaschemeken: Kaschen
- Kaseleken: Neumagdeburg
- Keppurdeggen: Kühlberg
- Kiaunen: Rodenheim
- Kiauten: Zellmühle
- Klein Bludszen/Bludschen: Klein Forsthausen
- Klein Dumbeln: Kräuterwiese
- Klein Duneyken: Klein Duneiken
- Klein Gudellen: Kleinguden
- Klein Jesziorken: Kleinschöntal
- Klein Kummetschen: Schäferberg (Ostpr.)
- Klein Rosinsko:Bergershof
- Kögskehmen: Kecksheim
- Kollnischken: Burgfelde
- Kosaken: Rappenhöh
- Kotziolken (since 1910) Langensee
- Kowalken: Beierswalde
- Kraginnen: Kraghof
- Kubillen: Nordenfeld
- Kuiken (Parish Goldap): Tannenhorst
- Kuiken (Parish Schittkehmen): Albrechtsrode
- Kurnehnen: Kurnen
- Langkischken: Langenwasser
- Lengkupchen: Lengenfließ
- Linkischken: Rabeneck
- Linnawen: Linnau (Ostpr.)
- Loyen: Loien
- Loyken: Loken
- Makunischken: Hohenwaldeck
- Maleyken: Maleiken
- Marczinowen: Martinsdorf
- Marlinowen: Mörleinstal
- Matznorkehmen: Matztal
- Matzutkehmen: Wellenhausen
- Meldienen: Gnadenheim
- Meschehnen: Wehrfeld
- Meschkrupchen: Meschen
- Mittel Jodupp: Mittelholzeck
- Mlinicken: Buschbach
- Morathen: Bergesruh
- Motzkuhnen: Motzken
- Murgischken: Bastental
- Naujehnen: Neuengrund
- Neu Bodschwingken: Neu Herandstal
- Ossöwen: Ossau
- Ostrowen: Mühlhof
- Ostrowken: Waldbude
- Oszeningken/Oscheningken: Pfalzrode
- Pablindszen/Pablindschen: Zollteich
- Padingkehmen: Padingen
- Pallädschen: Frankeneck
- Pellkawen: Pellkauen
- Pelludschen: Pellau
- Pietraschen: Rauental (Ostpr.)
- Plautzkehmen: Engern (Ostpr.)
- Plawischken: Plauendorf
- Pogorzellen: (since 1906) Hegelingen
- Pöwgallen: Pöwen
- Präslauken: Praßlau
- Präroszlehnen: (since 1935) Jägersee
- Rakowken: Stoltznersdorf
- Regellen: Glaubitz
- Ribbenischken: Ribbenau
- Roponatschen: Steinheide
- Rudzien: Rodenstein (Ostpr.)
- Samonienen: Kaltfließ
- Sausleschowen: Seefelden (Ostpr.)
- Skötschen: Grönfleet,
- Schabojeden: Sprindberg
- Schaltinnen: Quellental
- Schardeningken: Schardingen
- Scheldkehmen: Schelden
- Schillinnen: Heidensee
- Schuiken: Spechtsboden
- Serteggen: Serteck
- Skaisgirren: Hellerau (Ostpr.)
- Skarupnen: Hartental
- Skötschen: Grönfleet
- Sokollen: Hainholz
- Stonupönen: Kaltenbach
- Stukatschen: Freienfeld
- Stumbern: Auersfeld
- Summowen: Summau
- Sutzken: (since 1933) Hitlershöhe
- Szabojeden/Schabojeden: Sprindberg
- Szielasken/Schielasken: Hallenfelde
- Szittkehmen/Schittkehmen: Wehrkirchen
- Tartarren: Noldental
- Thewelkehmen: Tulkeim
- Theweln: Pfalzberg
- Tollmingkehmen: Tollmingen
- Upidamischken: Altenzoll
- Wannaginnen: Wangenheim
- Warkallen: Wartenstein
- Werxnen: Grünhügel
- Wiersbianken: Lichtenhain
- Wilkassen: Kleineichicht
- Wilkatschen: Birkendorf
- Wyschupönen: Kaltensee
- Zodschen: Zoden

==== Municipality of Sutzken/Hitlershöhe ====
On 27 October 1933 the rural community of Sutzken (now known in Polish as Suczki) was renamed Hitlershöhe. This was based on the following application by the municipality dated 9 March 1933:

"The village of Sutzken in the Goldap district is a farming village with 167 inhabitants. It is located on the heights south of the town of Goldap. 95% of the residents are National Socialists, while the remaining 5% are German nationalists. There hasn't been a Marxist here for years. [...]."

Hitler gave his approval on 12 April 1933 and the new name Hitlershöhe came into effect on 27 October 1933.
