= Rostek =

Rostek may refer to:

- Rostek, Gołdap County, a village in northern Poland
- Rostek, Mrągowo County, a settlement in north-central Poland
- Rostek (surname)

== See also ==
- Rostec, a Russian state-owned defense conglomerate
