= Janki, Warmian-Masurian Voivodeship =

Janki
- Settlement
- Location within Poland
- Coordinates: 54°15′14″N 22°8′55″E
- Country: Poland
- Voivodeship: Warmian-Masurian
- County: Gołdap
- Gmina: Gołdap

Janki [ˈjanki] is a settlement in the administrative district of Gmina Gołdap, within Gołdap County, Warmian-Masurian Voivodeship, in northern Poland, which is close to the border with the Kaliningrad Oblast of Russia.
