= Wilkasy =

Wilkasy may refer to the following places:

- Wilkasy, Giżycko County in Warmian-Masurian Voivodeship (north Poland)
- Wilkasy, Gołdap County in Warmian-Masurian Voivodeship (north Poland)
- Wilkasy, Olecko County in Warmian-Masurian Voivodeship (north Poland)
