= Zatyki =

Zatyki may refer to the following places:

- Zatyki, Gołdap County in Warmian-Masurian Voivodeship (north Poland)
- Zatyki, Iława County in Warmian-Masurian Voivodeship (north Poland)
- Zatyki, Olecko County in Warmian-Masurian Voivodeship (north Poland)
