= Kolniszki =

- Village
- Location within Poland
- Coordinates: 54°16′N 22°23′E
- Country: Poland
- Voivodeship: Warmian-Masurian
- County: Gołdap
- Gmina: Gołdap
- Founded: 1564
- Founder: Jan Bender
- Time zone: UTC+1 (CET)
  - Summer (DST): UTC+2 (CEST)
- Vehicle registration: NGO

Kolniszki [kɔlˈniʂki] is a village in the administrative district of Gmina Gołdap, within Gołdap County, Warmian-Masurian Voivodeship, in north-eastern Poland, close to the border with the Kaliningrad Oblast of Russia.

Kolniszki was founded in 1564 by Jan Bender from Skocze, who bought land to establish the village.

== Notable residents ==
- Herbert Ehrenberg (1926–2018), German politician
