= Błażejewo =

Błażejewo may refer to the following places:

- Błażejewo, Poznań County in Greater Poland Voivodeship (west-central Poland)
- Błażejewo, Śrem County in Greater Poland Voivodeship (west-central Poland)
- Błażejewo, Warmian-Masurian Voivodeship (north Poland)
