= Galwiecie =

- Village
- Location within Poland
- Coordinates: 54°18′27″N 22°25′24″E
- Country: Poland
- Voivodeship: Warmian-Masurian
- County: Gołdap
- Gmina: Gołdap
- Time zone: UTC+1 (CET)
  - Summer (DST): UTC+2 (CEST)
- Vehicle registration: NGO

Galwiecie [ɡalˈvjɛt͡ɕɛ] is a village in the administrative district of Gmina Gołdap, within Gołdap County, Warmian-Masurian Voivodeship, in northern Poland, close to the border with the Kaliningrad Oblast of Russia. It is located in the region of Masuria.

The Wierzbicki Polish noble family lived in the village.
