= Pietraszki, Warmian-Masurian Voivodeship =

Pietraszki
- Village
- Location within Poland
- Coordinates: 54°19′N 22°11′E
- Country: Poland
- Voivodeship: Warmian-Masurian
- County: Gołdap
- Gmina: Gołdap

Pietraszki [pjɛˈtraʂki] is a village in the administrative district of Gmina Gołdap within Gołdap County Warmian-Masurian Voivodeship, in northern Poland. Pietraszki lies close to the border with the Kaliningrad Oblast of Russia. and is approximately 9 km (6 mi) west of Gołdap and 125 km (78 mi) northeast of the regional capital Olsztyn.
