= Mażucie =

- Village
- Location within Poland
- Coordinates: 54°20′N 22°11′E
- Country: Poland
- Voivodeship: Warmian-Masurian
- County: Gołdap
- Gmina: Gołdap
- Time zone: UTC+1 (CET)
  - Summer (DST): UTC+2 (CEST)
- Vehicle registration: NGO

Mażucie [maˈʐut͡ɕɛ] is a village in the administrative district of Gmina Gołdap, within Gołdap County, Warmian-Masurian Voivodeship, in north-eastern Poland, close to the border with the Kaliningrad Oblast of Russia.

== History ==
In 1856, the village had a population of 81. In 1938, during a massive campaign of renaming of placenames, the Nazi government of Germany renamed the village to Oberhofen in attempt to erase traces of non-German origin. After Germany's defeat in World War II, in 1945, it became again part of Poland.
