= Sokoły, Gołdap County =

Sokoły
- Village
- Location within Poland
- Coordinates: 54°15′37″N 22°9′35″E
- Country: Poland
- Voivodeship: Warmian-Masurian
- County: Gołdap
- Gmina: Gołdap

Sokoły [sɔˈkɔwɨ] is a village in the administrative district of Gmina Gołdap, within Gołdap County, Warmian-Masurian Voivodeship, in northern Poland, close to the border with the Kaliningrad Oblast of Russia.
