= Grabowo, Gołdap County =

Grabowo
- Village
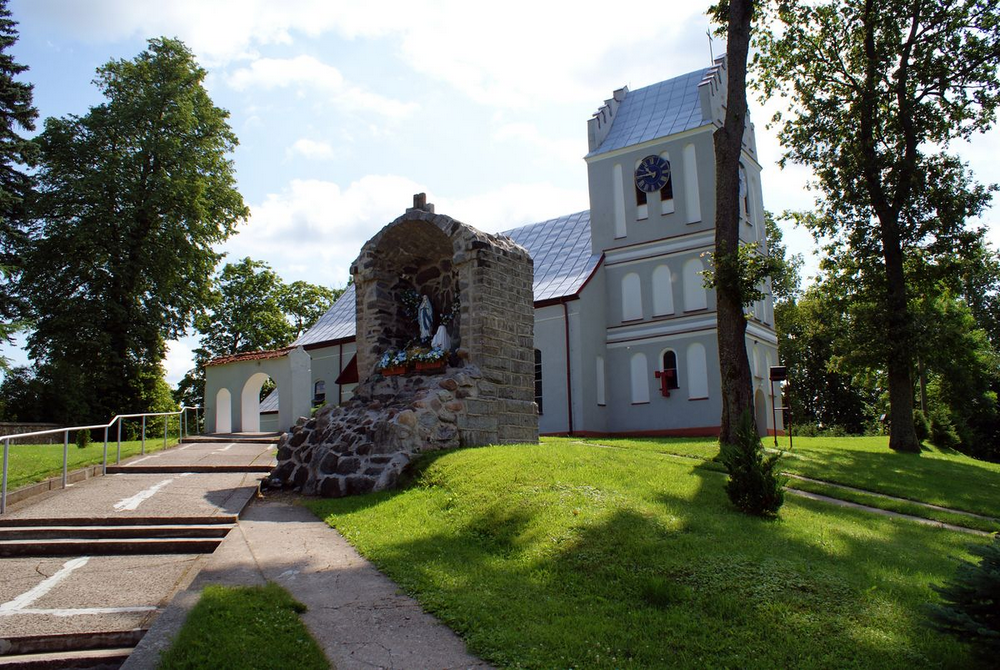
- Church in Grabowo

- Location within Poland
- Coordinates: 54°13′N 22°14′E
- Country: Poland
- Voivodeship: Warmian-Masurian
- County: Gołdap
- Gmina: Gołdap
- Time zone: UTC+1 (CET)
  - Summer (DST): UTC+2 (CEST)
- Vehicle registration: NGO

Grabowo [ɡraˈbɔvɔ] is a village in the administrative district of Gmina Gołdap, within Gołdap County, Warmian-Masurian Voivodeship, in north-eastern Poland, close to the border with the Kaliningrad Oblast of Russia. It is located in the historic region of Masuria.

== History ==
The local church was founded in 1589. In the late 19th century, the village had a population of 521, Polish by ethnicity and Lutheran by confession.
