= Czarne, Gołdap County =

Czarne
- Village
- Location within Poland
- Coordinates: 54°16′10″N 22°29′51″E
- Country: Poland
- Voivodeship: Warmian-Masurian
- County: Gołdap
- Gmina: Dubeninki
- Population: 47

Czarne ([ˈt͡ʂarnɛ]; German: Czarnen, 1938–1945 Scharnen) is a village in the administrative district of Gmina Dubeninki, within Gołdap County, Warmian-Masurian Voivodeship, in northern Poland, close to the border with the Kaliningrad Oblast of Russia.
