= Grygieliszki =

- City
- Location within Poland
- Coordinates: 54°18′46″N 22°10′47″E
- Country: Poland
- Voivodeship: Warmian-Masurian
- County: Gołdap
- Gmina: Gołdap
- Population: 30

Grygieliszki [ɡrɨɡʲɛˈliʂki] is a village in the administrative district of Gmina Gołdap, within Gołdap County, Warmian-Masurian Voivodeship, in northern Poland, close to the border with the Kaliningrad Oblast of Russia.
