= Rożyńsk Wielki =

- Village
- Location within Poland
- Coordinates: 54°14′10″N 22°12′05″E
- Country: Poland
- Voivodeship: Warmian-Masurian
- County: Gołdap
- Gmina: Gołdap

Rożyńsk Wielki (Polish pronunciation: [ˈrɔʐɨj̃sk ˈfjɛlkʲi]) is a village in the administrative district of Gmina Gołdap, within Gołdap County, Warmian-Masurian Voivodeship, in northern Poland, close to the border with the Kaliningrad Oblast of Russia.
