= Wronki Wielkie =

- Village
- Location within Poland
- Coordinates: 54°15′20″N 22°16′18″E
- Country: Poland
- Voivodeship: Warmian-Masurian
- County: Gołdap
- Gmina: Gołdap
- Population: 400 (2,011)

Wronki Wielkie [ˈvrɔnki ˈvjɛlkʲɛ] is a village in the administrative district of Gmina Gołdap, within Gołdap County, Warmian-Masurian Voivodeship, in northern Poland, close to the border with the Kaliningrad Oblast of Russia.
