= Osowo, Warmian-Masurian Voivodeship =

Osowo
- Village
- Location within Poland
- Coordinates: 54°14′N 22°17′E
- Country: Poland
- Voivodeship: Warmian-Masurian
- County: Gołdap
- Gmina: Gołdap

Osowo ([ɔˈsɔvɔ]; German: Ossöwen, 1938–45 Ossau) is a village in the administrative district of Gmina Gołdap, within Gołdap County, Warmian-Masurian Voivodeship, in northern Poland, close to the border with the Kaliningrad Oblast of Russia.
