= Błąkały =

- Village
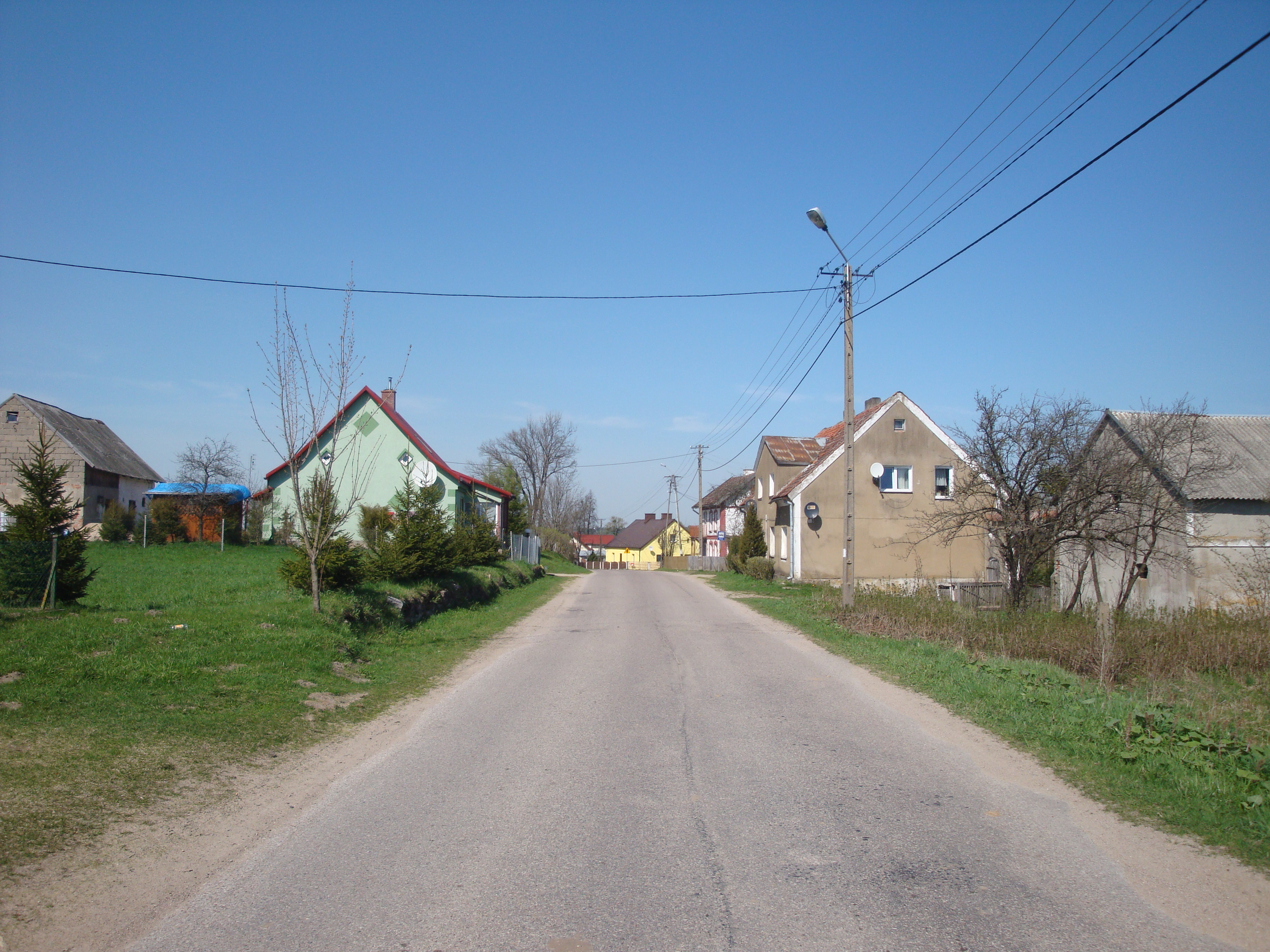

- Location within Poland
- Coordinates: 54°17′27″N 22°36′56″E
- Country: Poland
- Voivodeship: Warmian-Masurian
- County: Gołdap
- Gmina: Dubeninki
- Population: 81

Błąkały ([bwɔnˈkawɨ]; German: Blindgallen, 1938–1945 Schneegrund) is a village in the administrative district of Gmina Dubeninki, within Gołdap County, Warmian-Masurian Voivodeship, in northern Poland, close to the border with the Kaliningrad Oblast of Russia.

== Notable residents ==
- Gustav Dörr (1887–1928), German World War I pilot
