= Gustav Dörr =

German World War I fighter pilot

- Born: 5 October 1887; Blindgallen, East Prussia
- Died: 11 December 1928 (aged 41); Letzlingen, Altmark
- Military career
- Allegiance: Germany
- Rank: Leutnant
- Units: Fliegerersatz-Abteilung 2; Fliegerersatz-Abteilung 3; Flieger-Abteilung 6; Flieger-Abteilung 68; Flieger-Abteilung 257; Jagdstaffel 45
- Awards: Military Merit Cross; Iron Cross

Gustav Dörr (5 October 1887 – 11 December 1928) was a German World War I fighter pilot credited with 35 victories. He went on to become one of the world's first airline pilots.

== Early life and infantry service ==
Gustav Dörr was born on 5 October 1887 in Blindgallen, East Prussia, the son of a building contractor. He completed trade school and began work at age 18 with Krupp AG. In 1908, he enlisted in Infanterie-Regiment 176, and was promoted to non-commissioned officer.

In August 1914, with the start of World War I, he was recalled. On 20 August 1914, he was seriously wounded, taking until November to recover. Upon his return he fought in actions along the Rawka River near Warsaw. During an attack on 17 February 1915, he was bayoneted in his right hip. This wound put him in the garrison hospital at Naumburg. He was incapacitated for front line duty, and was recommended for service in the reserve battalion of his regiment.

== Aerial service ==
Dörr saw a circular from the War Ministry asking for volunteers for pilot training. Dörr applied and was accepted despite his physical condition and relatively advanced age. He reported for training with Fliegerersatz-Abteilung 2 at Döberitz in July 1915 and later at Fliegerersatz-Abteilung 3 in Gotha.

On 18 March 1916, he was posted as a Vizefeldwebel to Flieger-Abteilung 68; an artillery observation unit engaged in artillery spotting. One of his comrades there was future ace Ernst Udet.

Dörr and his observer Oberleutnant Serger were transferred to Flieger-Abteilung 6 to help counter heavy Allied air pressure. He stayed with the unit through its redesignation as Flieger-Abteilung 257 in May 1916, and participated in air operations prior to the Battle of the Somme in July. Dörr earned an Iron Cross Second Class while assigned to Flieger-Abteilung 6; it was awarded on 7 April 1916. He would subsequently receive the First Class Iron Cross on 17 April 1917.

In June 1917, the elevator on Dörr's plane failed in flight, and he crashed from an altitude of 1400 meters (4,600 feet). His observer, Leutnant Bohn, was killed; Dörr survived with his jaw broken in six places. This serious injury kept him out of action for three months. Upon recovery, he was trained as a fighter pilot.

Dörr returned to duty at Fliegerersatz-Abteilung 1 as a test pilot from November 1917 until February 1918. He was then transferred from flying two seaters into Jagdstaffel 45, a fighter squadron. His first victory was in a dogfight that saw six Germans tackle 26 French and British machines. Dörr shot down a Sopwith 1½ Strutter on 17 March 1918.

He downed a French Breguet 14 on 28 May, only to be shot down in flames by others in the formation. Fortunately, his altitude was only 400 meters (1,300 feet); he crash landed in no man's land between the French and German trenchworks with minor burns and made it back to German lines under heavy fire.

Dörr claimed an unconfirmed victory only three days later and added three confirmed claims for the rest of June. In July, he logged eleven more victories, scoring consistently and increasingly often through the month. August added six more victories, bringing his total to 23. On 29 August, he was awarded the Gold Military Merit Cross; this was the enlisted man's equivalent of the better-known Pour le Merite or "Blue Max" given to officers.

September saw seven confirmed victories—three Spad VIIs and four Spad XIs. Dörr's tally now stood at 30. He was also commissioned as a leutnant in September. The exact date is uncertain, but with his 24th and 25th victims falling on the 2nd, Dörr had at least 23 victories when he became an officer. Once commissioned, he was eligible for officer's decorations. At the time, the minimum requirement for a flier winning the Pour le Merite was 20 victories. Dörr was well past that total and capable of adding to his score.

On 25 October, he was finally proposed for the Pour le Merite. Two days later, he scored his 34th victory and had another unconfirmed claim. Another probable came the next day. His last victory of the war, his 35th, came on 30 October 1918. On 4 November, he had a third indecisive bout.

Gustav Dörr would not receive the Blue Max. The Kaiser abdicated without approving his award.

== Victories ==
Victory	Date	Aircraft	Place	Time
1	17. March 1918	Sopwith 1½ Strutter	Montzeville, Verdun	07:20h
2	11 April 1918	SPAD S.VII	Tracy le Mont	
3	28 May 1918	Bréguet 14	Vendeuil	15:00h
n.a.	1 June 1918	RE8	La Ferte Milon	
4	12 June 1918	SPAD S.VII	Haraumont	
5	28 June 1918	SPAD S.XIII	Villers-Cotterets	
6	28 June 1918	SPAD S.VII	Villers-Cotterets	
7	5 July 1918	Bréguet 14	Brumetz	11:10h
8	8 July 1918	Bréguet 14	Villers-Cotterets	11:30h
9	15 July 1918	SPAD S.VII	Comblizy	16:45h
10	15 July 1918	Bréguet 14	Nr Comblizy	17:00h
11	18 July 1918	SPAD S.XIII	Pernant	06:50h
12	18 July 1918	Bréguet 14	Montigny	07:05h
13	21 July 1918	SPAD	Neuilly	14:25h
14	24 July 1918	SPAD S.XIII	Pernant	11:30h
15	25 July 1918	Bréguet 14	La Croix	11:00h
16	29 July 1918	Bréguet 14	Fere-en-Tardenois	17:00h
17	30 July 1918	SPAD S.VII	Coincy	11:50h
18	1 August 1918	Nieuport 28	Bruyeres	11:00h
19	4 August 1918	Bréguet 14	Nampteuil	08:10h
20	11 August 1918	Bréguet 14	Braisne	12:30h
21	21 August 1918	SPAD S.XI	Rosnay	11:45h
22	21 August 1918	SPAD	Branges	
23	24 August 1918	Salmson 2A2	Vezaponin	13:30h
24	2 September 1918	SPAD S.XI	Ormes	11:25h
25	2 September 1918	SPAD S.XI	Reims	11:30h
26	4 September 1918	SPAD S.VII	N Fismes	14:00h
27	14 September 1918	SPAD S.XI	Blanzy	
28	16 September 1918	SPAD S.VII	Fismes	
29	24 September 1918	SPAD S.VII	Soissons	19:00h
30	26 September 1918	SPAD S.XI	Fismes 13:00h	
31	3 October 1918	Salmson 2A2	Coucy le Chateau	
32	5 October 1918	Salmson 2A2	Brimont	
33	9 October 1918	Bréguet 14	Coucy le Chateau	
n.a.	27 October 1918	SPAD S.XI	u/c Malmaison	10.00h
34	27 October 1918	SPAD S.XI	Amifontaine	15.40h
n.a.	28 October 1918	SPAD		
35	30 October 1918	Salmson 2A2	Missy	11.00h
n.a.	4 November 1918	Einsitzer		

== After the war ==
Gustav Dörr became one of the world's original commercial airline pilots after the war. He flew 580,000 kilometers (360,000 mi) for Deutsche Luft Hansa.

On 11 December 1928, he was piloting a Junkers G 31 on a night flight from Cologne to Berlin. He attempted an emergency landing at Letzlinger Heide. His plane brushed a tree on final approach and crash landed. Spilled fuel caught fire and killed Dörr and his crew. Luft Hansa later commemorated him by naming one of its airliners after him.

== Sources ==
- Franks, Norman; Bailey, Frank W.; Guest, Russell (1993). Above the Lines: The Aces and Fighter Units of the German Air Service, Naval Air Service and Flanders Marine Corps, 1914-1918. Grub Street. ISBN 978-0-948817-73-1.
