= Szyliny =

- Settlement
- Location within Poland
- Coordinates: 54°20′1″N 22°21′44″E
- Country: Poland
- Voivodeship: Warmian-Masurian
- County: Gołdap
- Gmina: Gołdap

Szyliny [ʂɨˈlinɨ] is a settlement in the administrative district of Gmina Gołdap, within Gołdap County, Warmian-Masurian Voivodeship, in northern Poland, close to the border with the Kaliningrad Oblast of Russia.
