= Chistye Prudy, Kaliningrad Oblast =

Chistye Prudy
- Village
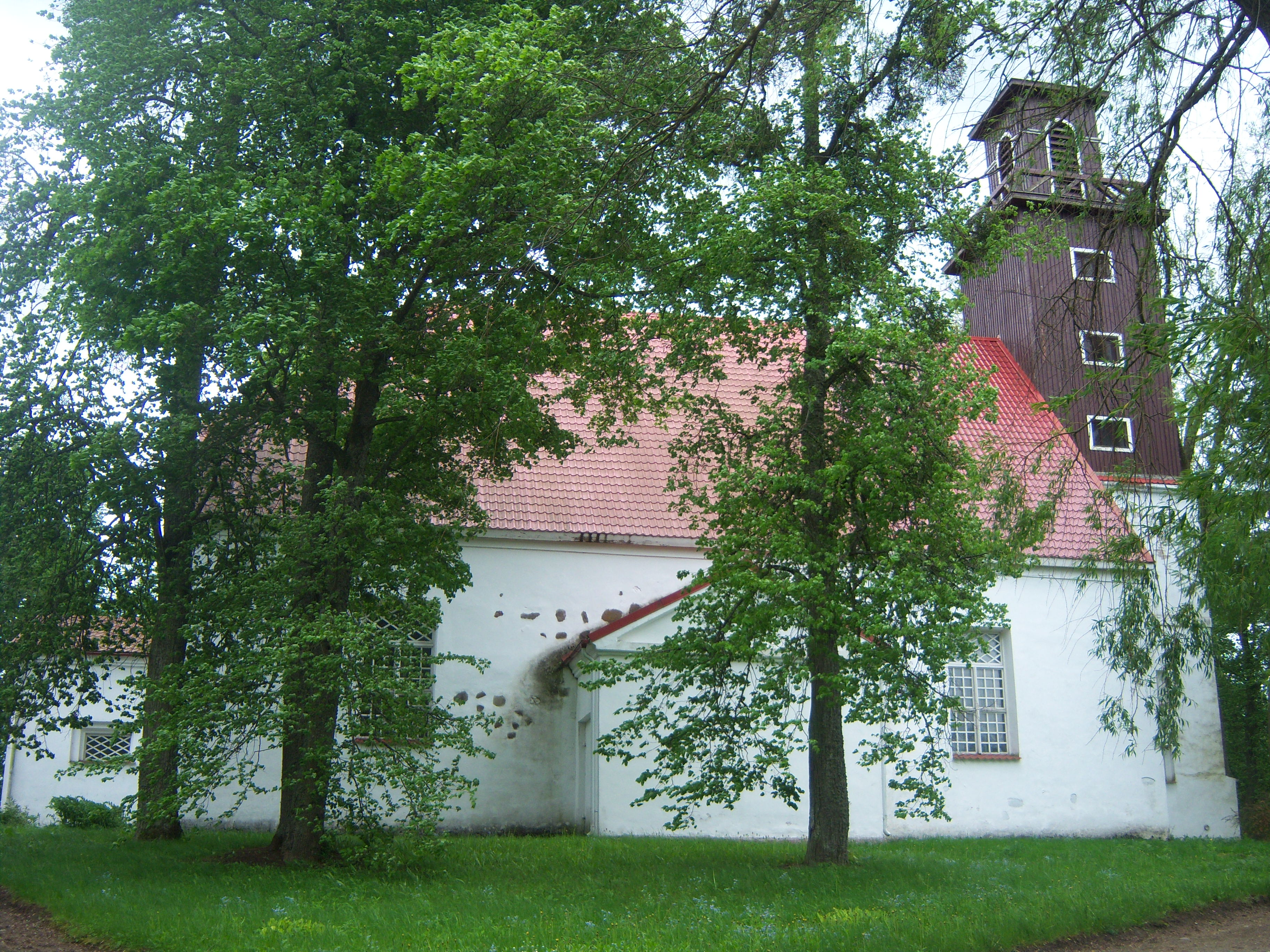
- Memorial Museum of Kristijonas Donelaitis (former church)

- Location within Kaliningrad Oblast Location within European Russia
- Coordinates: 54°27′31″N 22°26′17″E
- Country: Russia
- Oblast: Kaliningrad
- District: Nesterov

Chistye Prudy (Russian: Чи́стые Пруды́; German: Tollmingkehmen, 1938-46 Tollmingen; Lithuanian: Tolminkiemis; Polish: Tołminkiejmy) is a rural locality (a settlement) in Nesterovsky District of Kaliningrad Oblast, Russia. The settlement is located about 15 kilometres (9.3 mi) from the Russian border with Lithuania.

== Geography ==
The place is located northwest of the Romincka Forest not far from the borders with Lithuania and Poland.

== History ==
Tollmingkehmen was mentioned in written sources in the 14th century. In 1454, the region was incorporated by King Casimir IV Jagiellon to the Kingdom of Poland upon the request of the anti-Teutonic Prussian Confederation. After the subsequent Thirteen Years' War (1454–1466) the Teutonic Order regained authority over the region as a fief of the Polish Crown. From 1525 it was held by Ducal Prussia. In 1589, it became a center of a parish. Many famous people worked in the parish including Kristijonas Donelaitis, the author of the first Lithuanian poem The Seasons. Donelaitis was a Lutheran pastor of the Lithuanian and German inhabitants of Tollmingkehmen for 37 years. He built a new church which is now reconstructed into his memorial museum.

From the 18th century it formed part of the Kingdom of Prussia, within which it administratively belonged to the district of Goldap, in the administrative region of Gumbinnen in the province of East Prussia, formed in 1773. It was an important cultural center in the Lithuania Minor region and had a sizable Prussian Lithuanian minority until the early 19th century, which was assimilated by the German population. In 1938, during a massive Nazi campaign of renaming of placenames, it was renamed to Tollmingen to erase traces of Lithuanian origin. The last Prussian Lithuanians fled during the last months of World War II or were expelled with the other inhabitants of the region after 1945 in accordance to the Potsdam Agreement. As a result of World War II, the area was annexed by the Soviet Union in 1945 and it was given the Russian name Chistye Prudy (literally "Clean Ponds").
