= Kamionki, Gołdap County =

Kamionki
- Village
- Location within Poland
- Coordinates: 54°12′36″N 22°21′20″E
- Country: Poland
- Voivodeship: Warmian-Masurian
- County: Gołdap
- Gmina: Gołdap

Kamionki [kaˈmjɔnki] is a village in the administrative district of Gmina Gołdap, within Gołdap County, Warmian-Masurian Voivodeship, in northern Poland, close to the border with the Kaliningrad Oblast of Russia.
