= Nowa Boćwinka =

- Village
- Location within Poland
- Coordinates: 54°15′N 22°11′E
- Country: Poland
- Voivodeship: Warmian-Masurian
- County: Gołdap
- Gmina: Gołdap

Nowa Boćwinka [ˈnɔva bɔt͡ɕˈfinka] is a village in the administrative district of Gmina Gołdap, within Gołdap County, Warmian-Masurian Voivodeship, in northern Poland, close to the border with the Kaliningrad Oblast of Russia.
