= Suczki, Gołdap County =

Suczki
- Village
- Location within Poland
- Coordinates: 54°15′58″N 22°18′11″E
- Country: Poland
- Voivodeship: Warmian-Masurian
- County: Gołdap
- Gmina: Gołdap
- Time zone: UTC+1 (CET)
  - Summer (DST): UTC+2 (CEST)
- Vehicle registration: NGO

Suczki [ˈsut͡ʂki] is a village in the administrative district of Gmina Gołdap, within Gołdap County, Warmian-Masurian Voivodeship, in north-eastern Poland, close to the border with the Kaliningrad Oblast of Russia. It is located in the historic region of Masuria.

The village was founded by Poles.
