= Żerdziny, Warmian-Masurian Voivodeship =

Żerdziny
- Village
- Location within Poland
- Coordinates: 54°21′35″N 22°47′5″E
- Country: Poland
- Voivodeship: Warmian-Masurian
- County: Gołdap
- Gmina: Dubeninki

Żerdziny ([ʐɛrˈd͡ʑinɨ]; German: Serteggen, 1938–1945 Serteck) is a village in the administrative district of Gmina Dubeninki, within Gołdap County, Warmian-Masurian Voivodeship, in northern Poland, close to the border with the Kaliningrad Oblast of Russia.
