= Samoniny =

- Village
- Location within Poland
- Coordinates: 54°12′46″N 22°10′18″E
- Country: Poland
- Voivodeship: Warmian-Masurian
- County: Gołdap
- Gmina: Gołdap

Samoniny [samɔˈninɨ](German language: Samonienen, 1938-1945 Klarfließ) is a village in the administrative district of Gmina Gołdap, within Gołdap County, Warmian-Masurian Voivodeship, in northern Poland, close to the border with the Kaliningrad Oblast of Russia.
