= Karl Schlegel (aviator) =

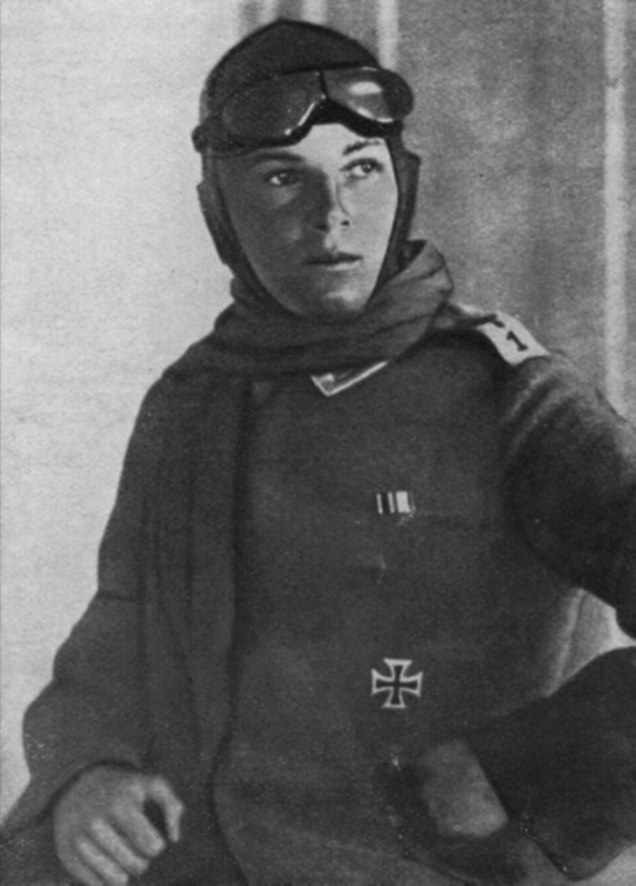
- Karl Schlegel
- Born: 7 May 1893; Wechselburg, Kingdom of Saxony
- Died: 27 October 1918 (aged 25); Near Amifontaine, France
- Military career
- Allegiance: German Empire
- Branch: Aviation
- Service years: 1912–1918
- Rank: Vizefeldwebel
- Units: Flieger-Abteilung 39, Jagdstaffel 45, Kampfeinsitzerstaffel 1
- Awards: Iron Cross, First and Second Class

Karl Paul Schlegel (7 May 1893 – 27 October 1918) was a German World War I flying ace credited with 22 victories. Schlegel was shot down by French ace Petar Marinovich. He was the last German ace to be killed in World War I.

== Prewar life ==
Karl Paul Schlegel was born in Wechselburg, the Kingdom of Saxony on 7 May 1893. He began attending military school in 1907. On 1 April 1912, he began active duty in the Royal Sachensburg Machine Gun Section #19 as a Gefreiter. He would later be serving with the 8th Cavalry Division when World War I began.

== World War I service ==
Schlegel served in both France and Russia as a cavalry sergeant in the early days of World War I. He won the Second Class Iron Cross during 1914. In April 1915, he was also awarded his native Saxony's Silver Military Order of St. Henry. That summer, he was the first noncommissioned officer in his division to win the First Class Iron Cross. However, he was tired of service in the trenches and volunteered for aerial service.

In Spring 1917, he underwent pilot's training and was posted to a Saxon two-seater replacement unit, Fliegerersatz-Abteilung 6. He transferred to Flieger-Abteilung 39, but after being injured in an accident, returned to FEA 6 in January 1918. He passed through Kest 1 on his way to posting with a fighter squadron, Royal Prussian Jagdstaffel 45. On 14 June 1918, he became a balloon buster for his first aerial victory. He downed two more enemy observation balloons in early July. On 15 July, he was both promoted to vizefeldwebel and became an ace by shooting down a pair of Spads. He would run his victory total to 12 by the end of the month, and add seven more victories in August. Three more balloons would fall to his guns in September, bring his total confirmed victories to 14 balloons and eight enemy airplanes. On 15 October, his exploits were rewarded with the Golden Military Merit Cross.

On 27 October 1918, he fought twelve French planes near Amifontaine, France, and lost. Petar Marinovich was credited with victory over him. Schlegel's last victories, over a balloon and a SPAD S.XI, went unconfirmed. Schlegel died of his wounds on 28 October 1918.
