= Marcinowo, Gołdap County =

Marcinowo
- Village
- Location within Poland
- Coordinates: 54°15′N 22°16′E
- Country: Poland
- Voivodeship: Warmian-Masurian
- County: Gołdap
- Gmina: Gołdap

Marcinowo [mart͡ɕiˈnɔvɔ] is a village in the administrative district of Gmina Gołdap, within Gołdap County, Warmian-Masurian Voivodeship, in northern Poland, bordering the Kaliningrad Oblast of Russia.
