= Boćwinka, Gmina Gołdap =

Boćwinka
- Village
- Location within Poland
- Coordinates: 54°12′N 22°9′E
- Country: Poland
- Voivodeship: Warmian-Masurian
- County: Gołdap
- Gmina: Gołdap
- Population: 280

Boćwinka [bɔt͡ɕˈfinka] is a village in the administrative district of Gmina Gołdap, within Gołdap County, Warmian-Masurian Voivodeship, in northern Poland, close to the border with the Kaliningrad Oblast of Russia.
