= Główka, Warmian-Masurian Voivodeship =

Główka
- Village
- Location within Poland
- Coordinates: 54°13′N 22°13′E
- Country: Poland
- Voivodeship: Warmian-Masurian
- County: Gołdap
- Gmina: Gołdap
- Time zone: UTC+1 (CET)
  - Summer (DST): UTC+2 (CEST)
- Vehicle registration: NGO

Główka [ˈɡwufka] is a village in the administrative district of Gmina Gołdap, within Gołdap County, Warmian-Masurian Voivodeship, in north-eastern Poland, close to the border with the Kaliningrad Oblast of Russia. It is located in the historic region of Masuria.

In the late 19th century, the village was Polish by ethnicity.
