= Babki, Warmian-Masurian Voivodeship =

Babki
- Village
- Location within Poland
- Coordinates: 54°13′34″N 22°26′59″E
- Country: Poland
- Voivodeship: Warmian-Masurian
- County: Gołdap
- Gmina: Gołdap
- Population: 210
- Time zone: UTC+1 (CET)
  - Summer (DST): UTC+2 (CEST)
- Vehicle registration: NGO

Babki [ˈbapki] is a village in the administrative district of Gmina Gołdap, within Gołdap County, Warmian-Masurian Voivodeship, in northern Poland, close to the border with the Kaliningrad Oblast of Russia. It is located in the historic region of Masuria.

== History ==
In the past, the territory was at various times part of Poland, Prussia and Germany. In 1938, the Nazi government of Germany renamed the village to Steinbrück to erase traces of Polish origin. In 1945, following Germany's defeat in World War II, the region became again part of Poland and the historic name of the village was restored.

== Transport ==
The Polish National road 65 runs nearby, west of the village.
