= Hans Rolfes =

German World War I flying ace (1894-1935)

- Born: 18 April 1894; Port Elizabeth, Cape Colony
- Died: 12 August 1935 (aged 41); Johannisthal Air Field, Berlin, Germany
- Military career
- Allegiance: Germany
- Branch: Aviation
- Rank: Leutnant
- Units: Fliegerersatz-Abteilung 2 (Replacement Detachment 2); Kagohl 2 (Tactical Bomber Wing 2); Kampfstaffel 11 (Tactical Bomber Squadron 11); Jagdstaffel 32 (Fighter Squadron 32)
- Commands: Jagdstaffel 45 (Fighter Squadron 45); Jagdgruppe Ost
- Conflicts: World War I
- Awards: Knight's Cross with Swords of the Royal House Order of Hohenzollern; Iron Cross First and Second Class

Hans Joachim Rolfes was a German World War I flying ace credited with 17 confirmed and two unconfirmed aerial victories. He scored his first confirmed victory while with Royal Bavarian Jagdstaffel 32, on 6 July 1917. His second and subsequent victories were while leading Royal Prussian Jagdstaffel 45 during the first nine months of 1918. On 29 September 1918, he was additionally given command of a four squadron wing. Rolfes died in an aviation accident on 12 August 1935.

== Biography ==
=== Early life and cavalry service ===
On 18 April 1894, Hans Joachim Rolfes was born in Port Elizabeth, South Africa. His father was the German Consul there. Rolfes began his education in local schools before being sent to London to study.

In 1912, he went home to Germany to enlist in the 14th Dragoon Regiment. He was still with them when they moved to the front as the First World War began. On 24 December 1914, he was commissioned as a Leutnant. Serving as such, he was badly wounded on 31 August 1915.

=== Aviation career ===
As he recovered, he requested transfer to aviation duty. After pilot training with Fliegerersatz-Abteilung 2 (Replacement Detachment 2), he was posted to Kagohl 2 (Tactical Bomber Wing 2) on 5 October 1915. As Kagohl 2 was composed of several different squadrons based separately, Rolfes flew on both the Eastern and Western Fronts. At some point, he transferred to Kampfstaffel 11 (Tactical Bomber Squadron 11); there he claimed an unconfirmed victory over a French Voisin. On 20 February 1917, he was transferred to a fighter squadron, Jagdstaffel 32. He scored his first accredited aerial victory while flying with them, shooting down a Farman over Moronvillers, France on 6 July 1917.

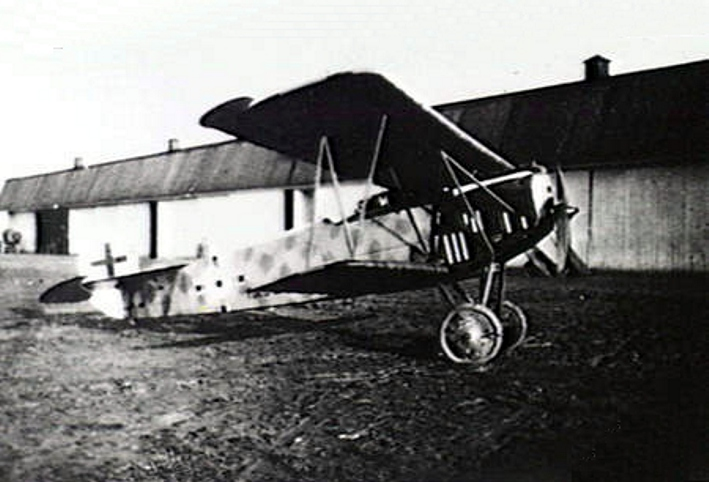
Rolfes' final mount was a Fokker D.VII.

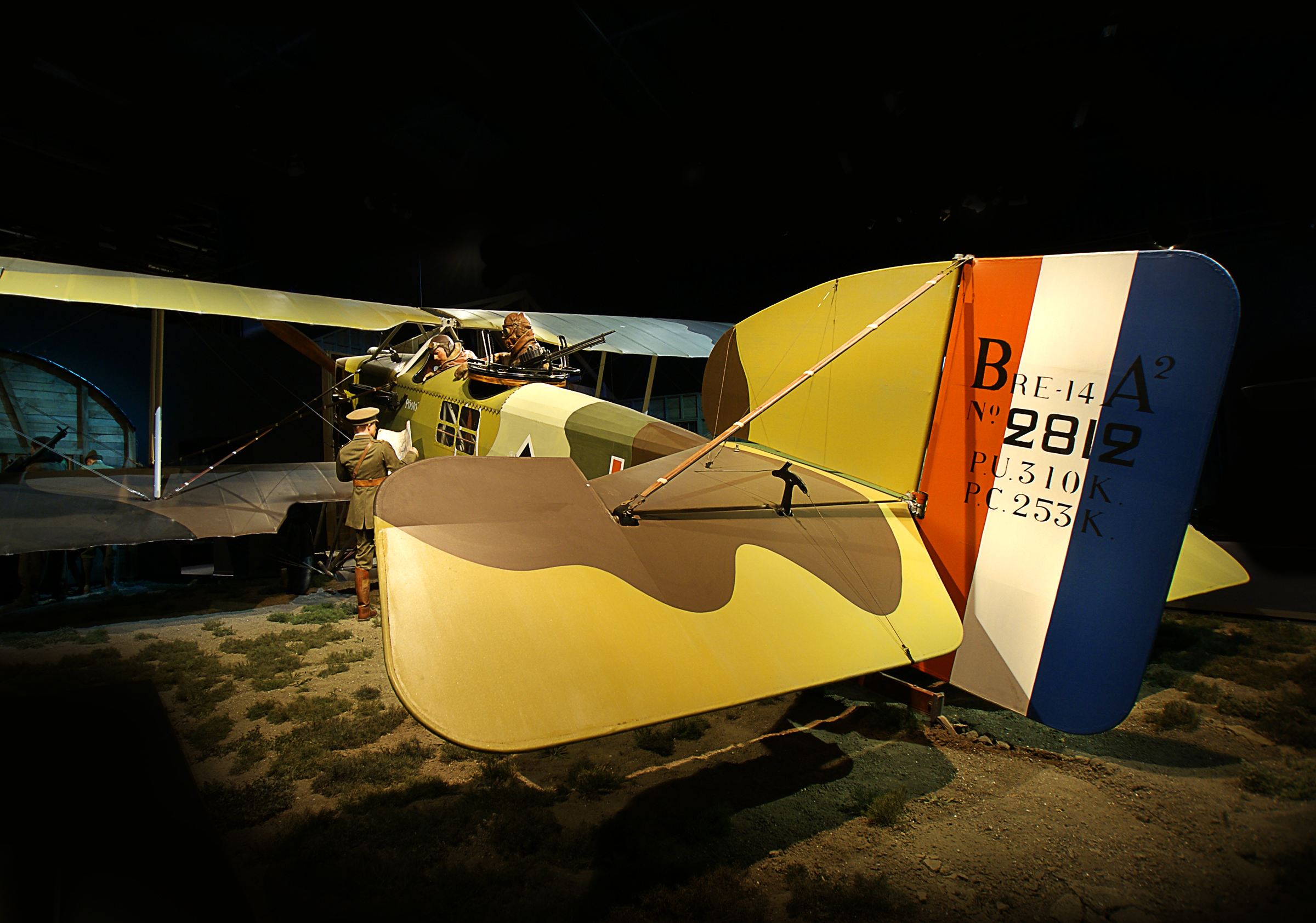
On three occasions, a Breguet 14 was Rolfes' victim.

On 17 December 1917, he was appointed to form a new fighter squadron, Jagdstaffel 45. He began scoring victories with them on 20 January 1918, running off a string of 16 more confirmed victories and an unconfirmed one. In July 1918 or early August, he was re-equipped with a Fokker D.VII. On 29 September 1918, he shot down his 17th and last confirmed victim. That was also the day the German High Command decided to combine his squadron with Jagdstaffeln 9, 21, and 66 to form Jagdgruppe Ost. Rolfes was given command of the Jagdgruppe in addition to commanding his own squadron. By war's end, he had been awarded the House Order of Hohenzollern, as well as both classes of the Iron Cross.

=== List of victories ===
Confirmed victories listed in date order. Unconfirmed claims are marked 'u/c'. Doubled lines in table indicate change of assignment.

No.	Date	Time	Aircraft	Result	Location	Notes
'u/c'	17 February 1917		Voisin	Forced to land		Claimed while with Kasta 11
1	6 July 1917	1320 hours	Farman	Destroyed.	Moronvillers	Only claim with Jasta 32
2	20 January 1918	1510 hours	Nieuport	Destroyed	Chattancourt, France	First victory with Jasta 45
3	16 March 1918	1250 hours	Observation balloon	Destroyed	Fort Marre	
4	17 March 1918	0710 hours	SPAD	Destroyed	Malancourt, France	
5	6 May 1918	1700 hours	Breguet 14	Destroyed	Pimprez, France	
6	4 June 1918	1640 hours	SPAD	Destroyed	Coulcombs	
7	20 June 1918		Salmson 2A2	Destroyed	Chezy, France	
8	4 July 1918		Breguet 14	Destroyed	Villers Cotterets, France	
9	14 August 1918	1340 hours	SPAD	Destroyed	Branges, France	
10	20 August 1918	1250 hours	Breguet 14	Destroyed	Crecy-au-Mont, France	
11	29 August 1918		SPAD	Destroyed	Fismes, France	
12 and 13	2 September 1918	1600 and 1605 hours	Two SPAD 2s	Destroyed	Magneux, France	
14	4 September 1918	1400 hours	SPAD	Destroyed	North of Fismes, France	
15 and 16	6 September 1918	1635 and 1645 hours	Salmson 2A2; observation balloon	Destroyed	Magneux, France	
'u/c'	14 September 1918		SPAD S.11		Blanzy, France	
17	29 September 1918	1900 hours	BF.2b	Destroyed	Masnieres, France	

=== Postwar ===
Hans Joachim Rolfes died in an aviation accident at Johannisthal Air Field, just outside Berlin, on 12 August 1935.
