= Górne, Warmian-Masurian Voivodeship =

Górne
- Village
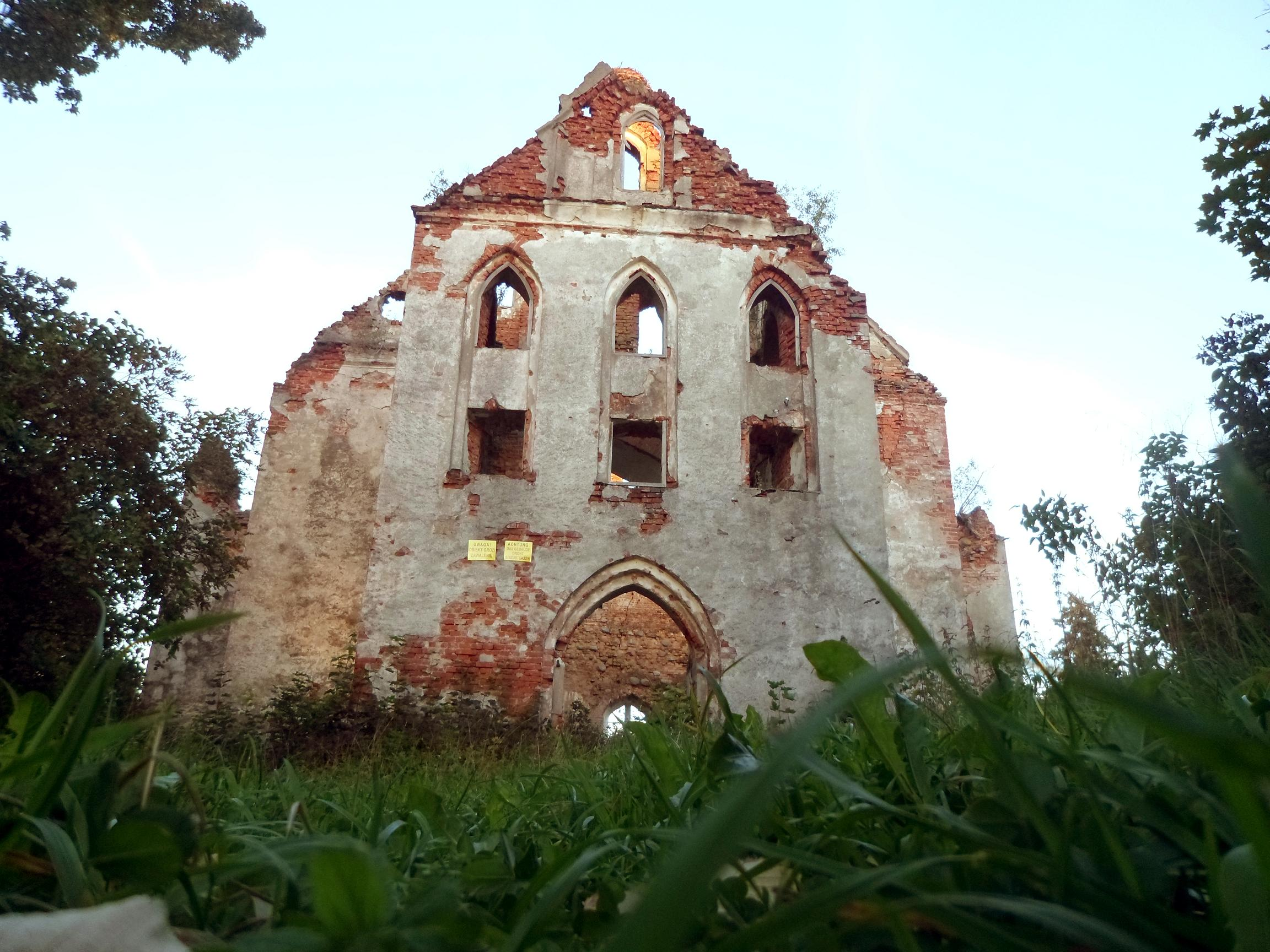

- Location within Poland
- Coordinates: 54°16′N 22°27′E
- Country: Poland
- Voivodeship: Warmian-Masurian
- County: Gołdap
- Gmina: Gołdap
- Time zone: UTC+1 (CET)
  - Summer (DST): UTC+2 (CEST)
- Vehicle registration: NGO

Górne [ˈɡurnɛ] is a village in the administrative district of Gmina Gołdap, within Gołdap County, Warmian-Masurian Voivodeship, in north-eastern Poland, close to the border with the Kaliningrad Oblast of Russia. It is located in the historic region of Masuria.

For centuries, the population of the village was Polish by ethnicity, and Protestant by confession. The local church was built in the 17th century.

== Transport ==
The Polish National road 65 runs nearby, west of the village.
