= Rudzie =

- Village
- Location within Poland
- Coordinates: 54°13′N 22°20′E
- Country: Poland
- Voivodeship: Warmian-Masurian
- County: Gołdap
- Gmina: Gołdap
- Time zone: UTC+1 (CET)
  - Summer (DST): UTC+2 (CEST)
- Vehicle registration: NGO

Rudzie [ˈrud͡ʑɛ] is a village in the administrative district of Gmina Gołdap, within Gołdap County, Warmian-Masurian Voivodeship, in north-eastern Poland, close to the border with the Kaliningrad Oblast of Russia. It is located in the historic region of Masuria.

In the late 19th century, the village had a population of 230, of mixed Polish, German, and Jewish ethnicity. In 1938, during a massive campaign of renaming of placenames, the Nazi government of Germany renamed the village to Rodenstein in attempt to erase traces of Polish origin. After Germany's defeat in World War II, in 1945, the village became again part of Poland and its historic Polish name was restored.
