= Pietrasze, Gołdap County =

Pietrasze
- Village
- Location within Poland
- Coordinates: 54°15′N 22°19′E
- Country: Poland
- Voivodeship: Warmian-Masurian
- County: Gołdap
- Gmina: Gołdap
- Founded: 1568
- Time zone: UTC+1 (CET)
  - Summer (DST): UTC+2 (CEST)
- Vehicle registration: NGO

Pietrasze [pjɛˈtraʂɛ] is a village in the administrative district of Gmina Gołdap, within Gołdap County, Warmian-Masurian Voivodeship, in north-eastern Poland, close to the border with the Kaliningrad Oblast of Russia. It is located in the region of Masuria.

== History ==
The origins of the village date back to 1568, when Piotr Skomacki bought land to establish a village. In 1750, its owner was Piotr Borowski.

In 1938, during a massive campaign of renaming of placenames, the Nazi government of Germany renamed the village to Rauental in attempt to erase traces of Polish origin. After Germany's defeat in World War II, in 1945, the village became again part of Poland and its historic Polish name was restored.
