= Wechselburg =

- Town
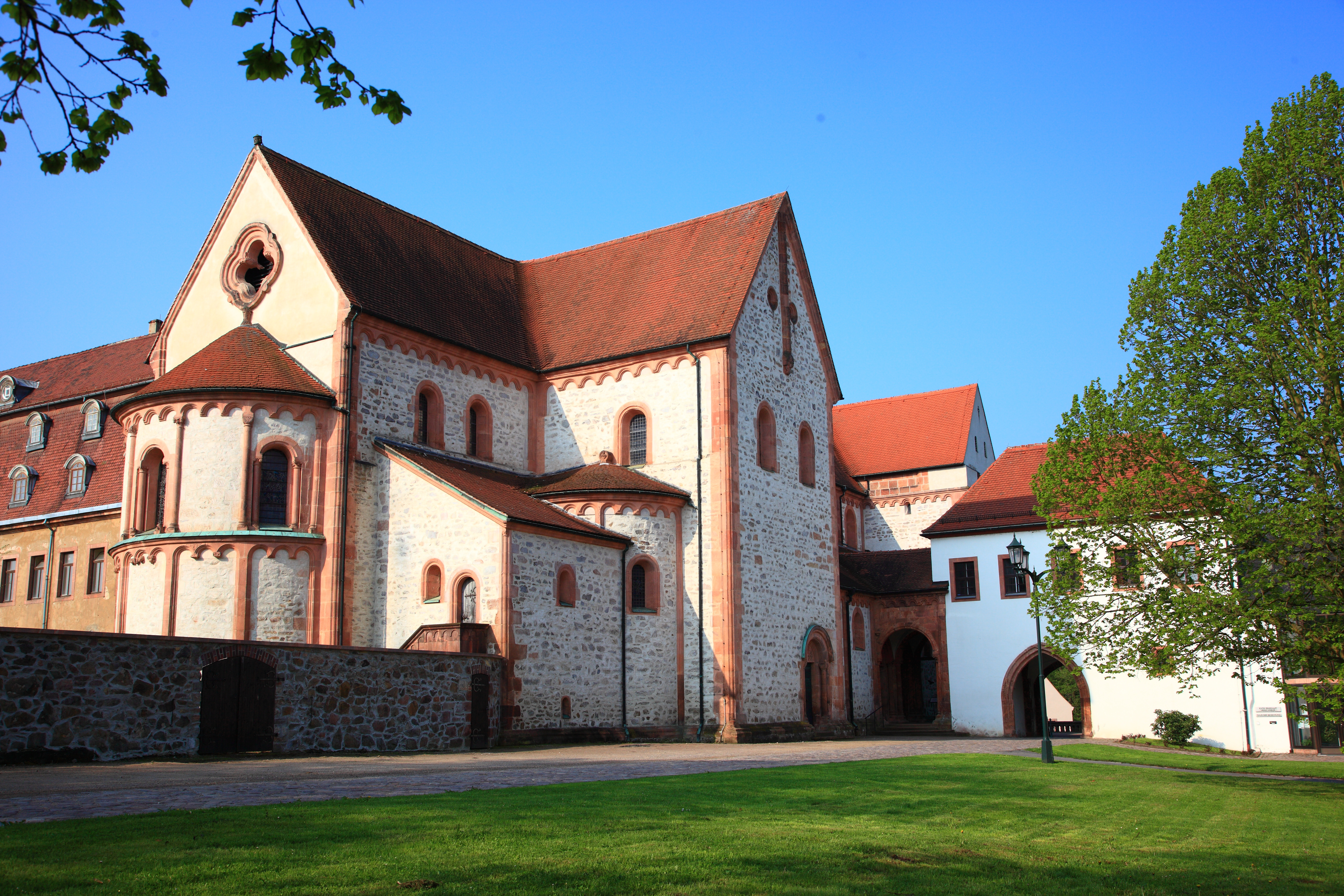
- Basilica of the Holy Cross

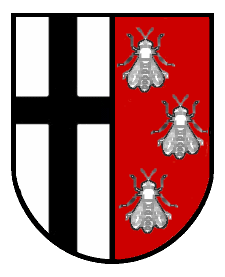
- Coat of arms

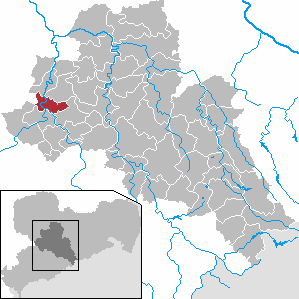
- Location of Wechselburg within Mittelsachsen district
- Interactive map of Wechselburg
- Location within Germany Location within Saxony
- Coordinates: 51°0′11″N 12°46′36″E
- Country: Germany
- State: Saxony
- District: Mittelsachsen
- Subdivisions: 13

Government
  - Mayor (2022–29): Daniel Bergert (CDU)

Area
  - Total: 25.66 km^{2} (9.91 sq mi)
- Elevation: 185 m (607 ft)

Population (2025-12-31)
  - Total: 1,702
  - Density: 66.33/km^{2} (171.8/sq mi)
- Time zone: UTC+01:00 (CET)
  - Summer (DST): UTC+02:00 (CEST)
- Postal codes: 09306
- Dialling codes: 037384
- Vehicle registration: FG
- Website: www.wechselburg.de

Wechselburg (German pronunciation: [ˈvɛksl̩bʊʁk]) is a municipality in the district of Mittelsachsen, in Saxony, Germany. It is well known for its twelfth century Benedictine monastery, the Wechselburg Priory.

The lordship and the castle were owned by the House of Schönburg from 1546 until 1945.

== Personalities ==
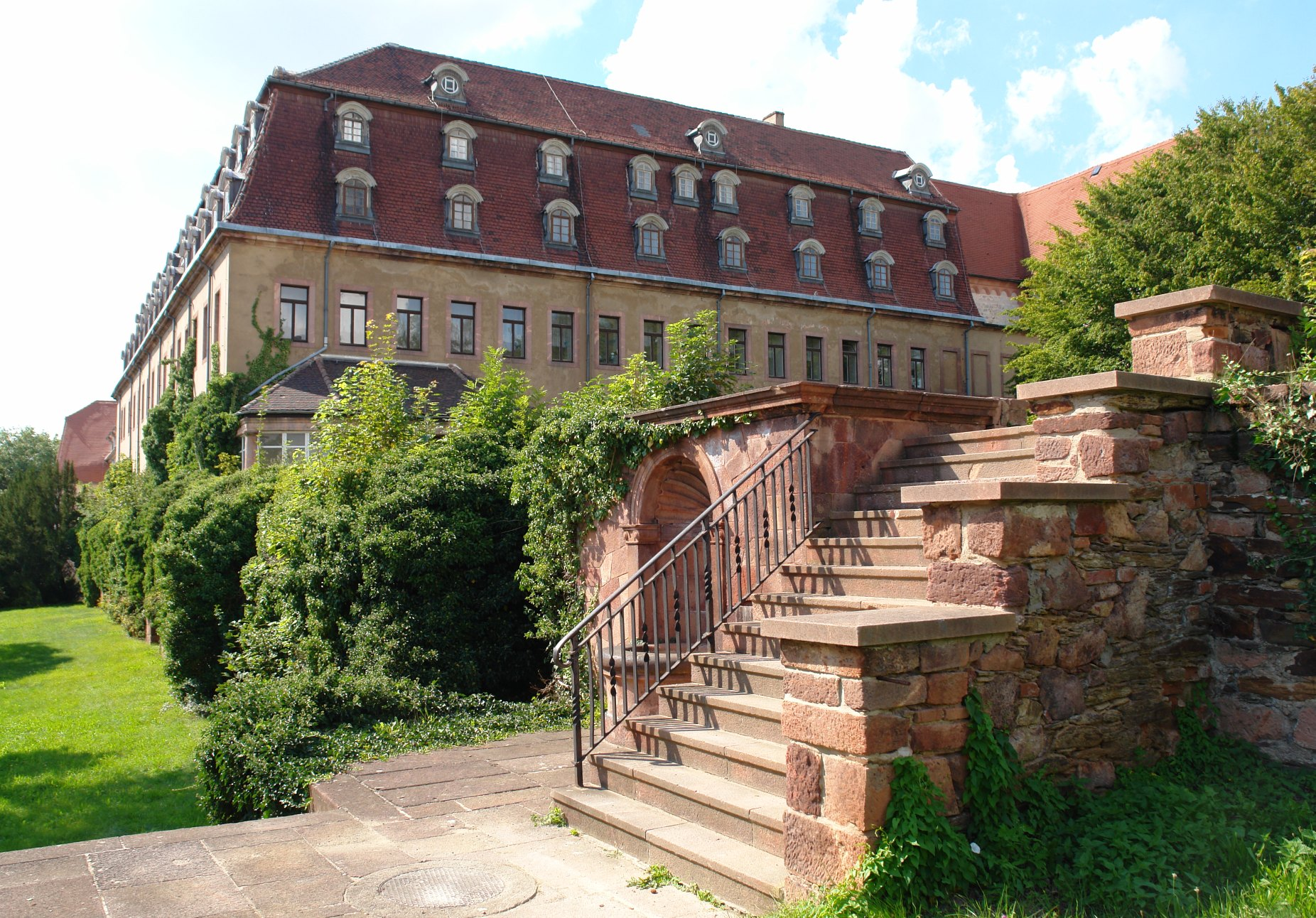
Wechselburg Palace

=== Sons and daughters of the community ===
- Karl Schlegel (aviator) (1893–1918), pilot in the First World War

=== Persons in connection with the municipality ===
- Martin Keller (athlete) (born 1986), athlete (sprinter)
