= Rożyńsk Mały =

- Village
- Location within Poland
- Coordinates: 54°15′2″N 22°9′11″E
- Country: Poland
- Voivodeship: Warmian-Masurian
- County: Gołdap
- Gmina: Gołdap
- Population: 200

Rożyńsk Mały (Polish pronunciation: [ˈrɔʐɨj̃sk ˈmawɨ]) is a village in the administrative district of Gmina Gołdap, within Gołdap County, Warmian-Masurian Voivodeship, in northern Poland, close to the border with the Kaliningrad Oblast of Russia.
