= Jagdstaffel 45 =

Jasta 45
- Active: 1917–1918
- Country: German Empire
- Branch: Luftstreitkräfte
- Type: Fighter squadron
- Engagements: World War I

Royal Prussian Jagdstaffel 45, commonly abbreviated to Jasta 45, was a "hunting group" (i.e., fighter squadron) of the Luftstreitkräfte, the air arm of the Imperial German Army during World War I. The squadron would score over 113 aerial victories during the war, including 28 observation balloons downed. The unit's victories came at the expense of four pilots killed in action, two injured in flying accidents, and five wounded in action.

== History ==
Jasta 45 was formed on 11 December 1917 at Flieger-Abteilung (Flier Detachment) 1 at Altenburg, Germany. It flew its first combat sorties on 9 January 1918, and scored its first aerial victory on the 20th. It was incorporated into Jagdgruppe 5 during July 1918. By the time it flew its final combat missions on 30 October 1918, the squadron was one of the highest scoring Jastas of 1918. Jasta 45 disbanded on 26 November 1918 at its point of origin.

== Commanding officers (Staffelführer) ==
- Hans Rolfes: 17 December 1917
- Lothar Zencominierski: ca October–November 1918

== Duty stations ==
- Marville, France: 25 December 1917
- Cohartville: 25 March 1918
- Vivaise, France
- Sissonne, France
- Mont-Saint-Martin, France
- Rocourt-Saint-Martin, France
- Arcy
- Mont-Notre-Dame, France
- Maizy, France
- Plomion, France
- Boulers

== Notable personnel ==
- Gustav Dörr
- Karl Schlegel
- Hans Rolfes
- Arno Benzler
- Karl Meyer

== Operations ==
Jasta 45 opened its career by supporting 5 Armee, beginning 25 December 1917. On 25 March 1918, it moved to support 7 Armee. It would remain in this assignment until war's end.
