= Wrotkowo =

- Village
- Location within Poland
- Coordinates: 54°15′N 22°21′E
- Country: Poland
- Voivodeship: Warmian-Masurian
- County: Gołdap
- Gmina: Gołdap

Wrotkowo [vrɔtˈkɔvɔ] is a village in the administrative district of Gmina Gołdap, within Gołdap County, Warmian-Masurian Voivodeship, in northern Poland; it is close to the border with the Kaliningrad Oblast of Russia.
