= Gmina Gołdap =

Gmina Gołdap Gołdap Commune
- Gmina
- Coat of arms
- Interactive map of Gmina Gołdap
- Coordinates (Gołdap): 54°18′58″N 22°18′34″E
- Country: Poland
- Voivodeship: Warmian-Masurian
- County: Gołdap
- Seat: Gołdap

Area
  - Total: 361.73 km^{2} (139.66 sq mi)

Population (2006)
  - Total: 19,918
  - Density: 55.063/km^{2} (142.61/sq mi)
  - Urban: 13,641
  - Rural: 6,277
- Website: http://www.goldap.pl/

Gmina Gołdap is an urban-rural gmina (administrative district) in Gołdap County, Warmian-Masurian Voivodeship, in northern Poland, on the border with Russia. Its seat is the town of Gołdap, which lies approximately 133 kilometres (83 mi) north-east of the regional capital Olsztyn.

The gmina covers an area of 361.73 square kilometres (139.7 sq mi), and as of 2006 its total population is 19,918 (out of which the population of Gołdap amounts to 13,641, and the population of the rural part of the gmina is 6,277).

The gmina contains part of the protected area called Puszcza Romincka Landscape Park.

== Villages ==
Apart from the town of Gołdap, Gmina Gołdap contains the villages and settlements of Babki, Bałupiany, Barkowo, Bitkowo, Błażejewo, Boćwinka, Boćwiński Młyn, Botkuny, Bronisze, Czarnowo Wielkie, Dąbie, Dunajek, Dunajek Mały, Dzięgiele, Galwiecie, Gieraliszki, Główka, Górne, Grabowo, Grygieliszki, Jabłońskie, Jabramowo, Janki, Janowo, Jany, Jeziorki Małe, Jeziorki Wielkie, Juchnajcie, Jurkiszki, Kalkowo, Kalniszki, Kamionki, Kolniszki, Konikowo, Kośmidry, Kowalki, Kozaki, Łobody, Marcinowo, Mażucie, Nasuty, Niedrzwica, Nowa Boćwinka, Okrasin, Osieki, Osowo, Piękne Łąki, Pietrasze, Pietraszki, Pogorzel, Regiele, Rostek, Rożyńsk Mały, Rożyńsk Wielki, Rudzie, Samoniny, Siedlisko, Skocze, Sokoły, Suczki, Szyliny, Tatary, Użbale, Wiłkajcie, Wilkasy, Włosty, Wronki Wielkie, Wrotkowo, Zatyki, Żelazki and Zielonka.

== Neighbouring gminas ==
Gmina Gołdap is bordered by the gminas of Banie Mazurskie, Dubeninki, Filipów and Kowale Oleckie. It also borders Russia (Kaliningrad oblast).
