= Dubeninki =

- Village
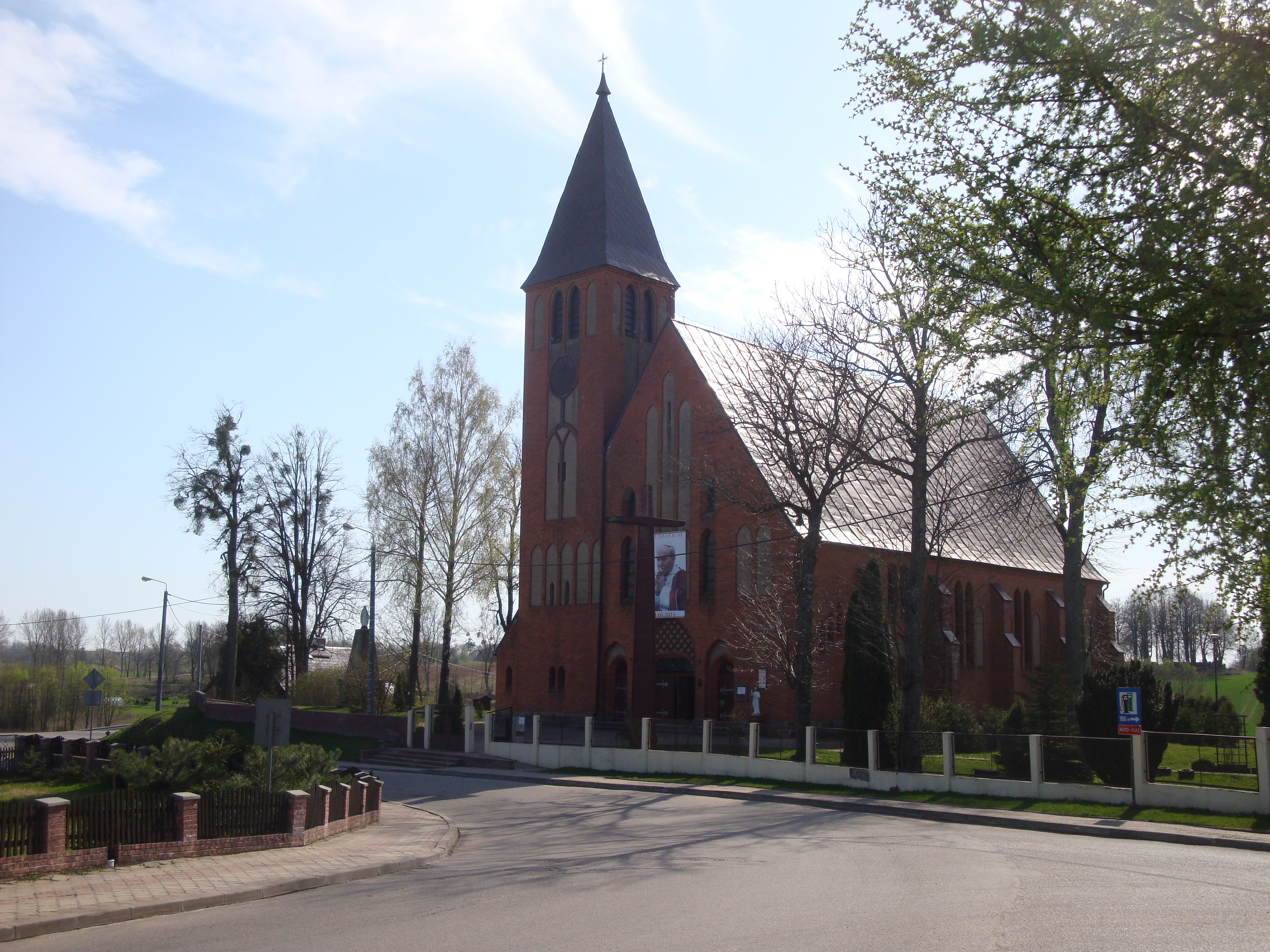

- Location within Poland
- Coordinates: 54°17′3″N 22°33′54″E
- Country: Poland
- Voivodeship: Warmian-Masurian
- County: Gołdap
- Gmina: Dubeninki
- Population: 962

Dubeninki ([dubɛˈninki]; German: Dubeningken, 1938–1945 Dubeningen; Lithuanian: Dubininkai) is a village in Gołdap County, Warmian-Masurian Voivodeship, in northern Poland, close to the border with the Kaliningrad Oblast of Russia. It is the seat of the gmina (administrative district) called Gmina Dubeninki.
