= Karl von Buchka =

German politician

Member of the Bundestag
- In office 6 October 1953 – 6 October 1957

Personal details
- Born: 23 September 1885 Göttingen
- Died: 11 February 1960 (aged 74) Freiburg, Lower Saxony, Germany
- Party: CDU

Karl von Buchka (23 September 1885 in Göttingen – 11 February 1960 in Freiburg, Lower Saxony) was a German politician active in both pre- and post-Second World War politics.

== Professional career ==
Involved in local politics, Buchka served as Landrat (a district administrator) in Blumenthal District, Hanover from 1917 to 1920 and in the same position in Kehdingen from 1921 to 1932. He was a member of the German People's Party until 1933 when, following Adolf Hitler's seizure of power, he took membership of the Nazi Party as member no. 1,683,854.

Buchka was a member of the Bundestag from 1953 to 1957, representing the Christian Democratic Union of Germany.
