= Rostek (surname) =

Rostek is a surname. Notable people with the surname include:

- John Rostek (1925–1969), American race car driver
- Marzena Rostek (fl. 2010), Polish-American economist
- Robert Rostek (born 1968), Polish civil servant and diplomat
