= Gołdap County =

Gołdap County Powiat gołdapski
- County
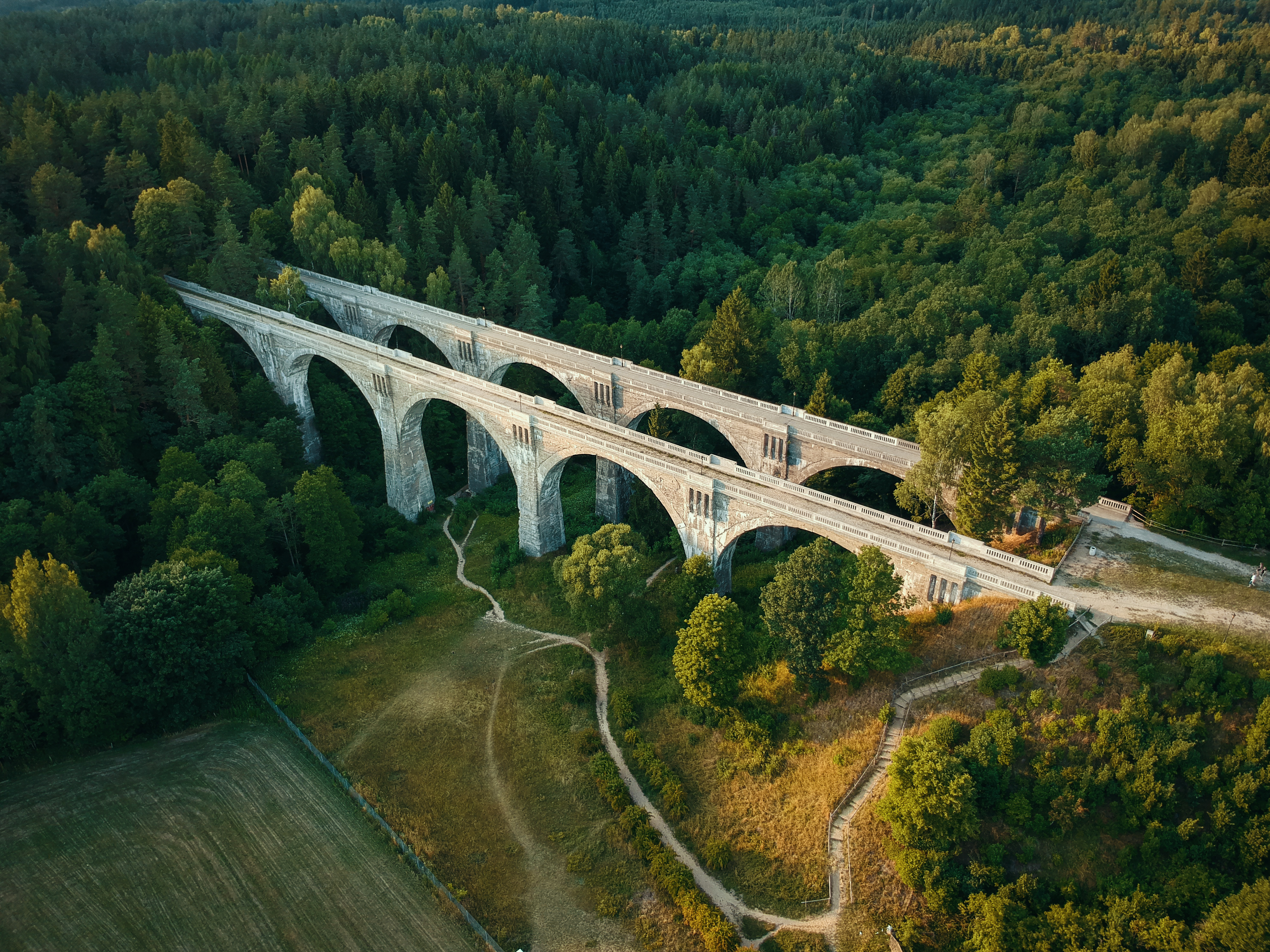
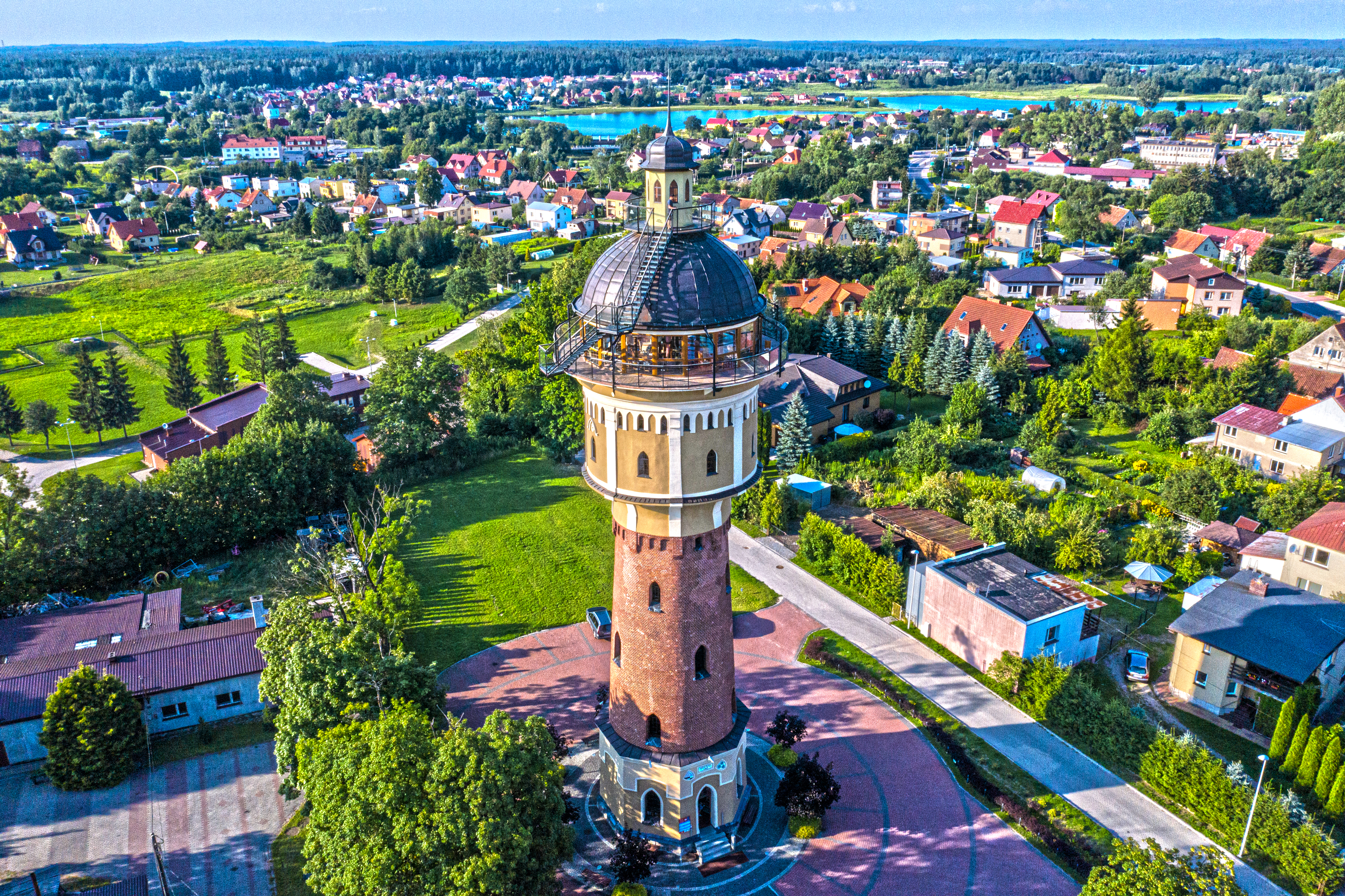
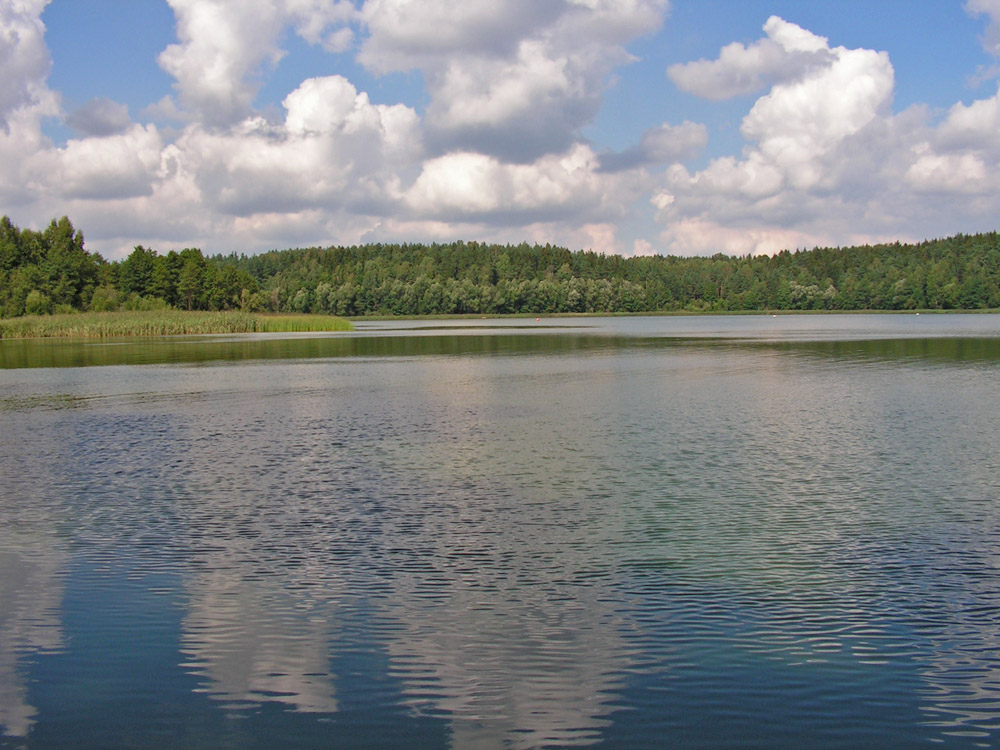
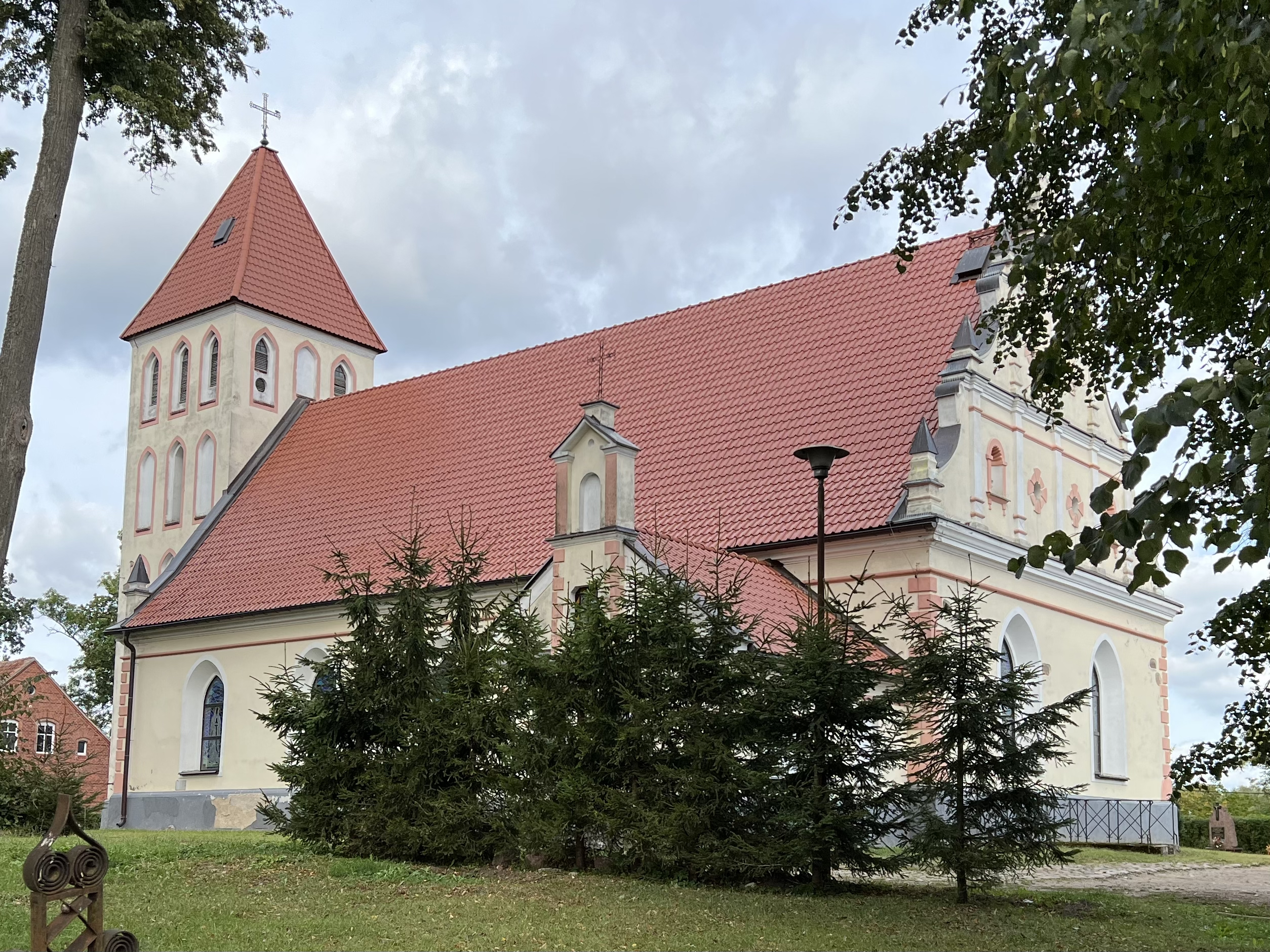
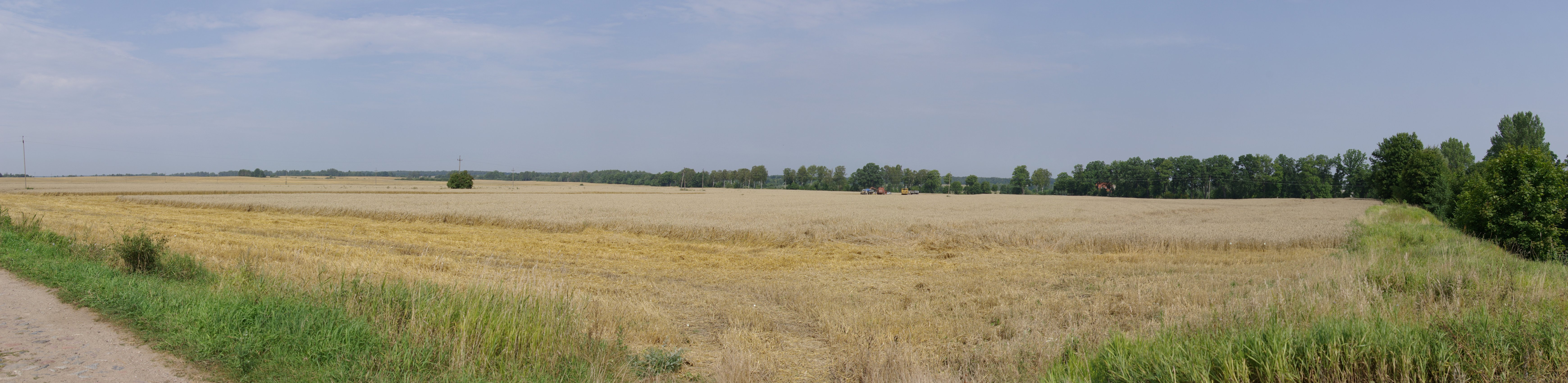
- Viaducts in Stańczyki Water tower in Gołdap Gołdap Lake Saint Anthony church in Banie Mazurskie Countryside in Mieduniszki Wielkie

- Flag Coat of arms

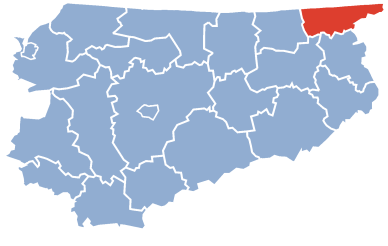
- Location within the voivodeship

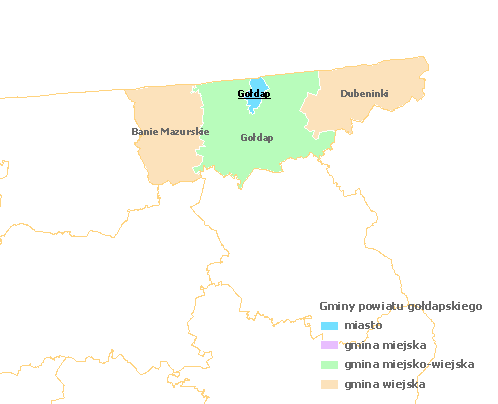
- Division into gminas
- Coordinates (Gołdap): 54°18′58″N 22°18′34″E
- Country: Poland
- Voivodeship: Warmian-Masurian
- Seat: Gołdap
- Gminas: Total 3: Gmina Banie Mazurskie; Gmina Dubeninki; Gmina Gołdap

Area
  - Total: 771.93 km^{2} (298.04 sq mi)

Population (2019)
  - Total: 26,825
  - Density: 34.751/km^{2} (90.004/sq mi)
  - Urban: 13,716
  - Rural: 13,109
- Time zone: UTC+1 (CET)
  - Summer (DST): UTC+2 (CEST)
- Car plates: NGO
- Website: powiatgoldap.pl

Gołdap County (Polish: powiat gołdapski) is a unit of territorial administration and local government (powiat) in Warmian-Masurian Voivodeship, north-eastern Poland, on the border with Russia. Its administrative seat and only town is Gołdap, which lies 133 kilometres (83 mi) north-east of the regional capital Olsztyn.

When powiats were re-introduced in the Polish local government reforms of 1999, the present Gołdap and Olecko Counties made up a single entity (called powiat olecko-gołdapski or Olecko-Gołdap County). This was divided into two in 2002.

The county covers an area of 771.93 square kilometres (298.0 sq mi). As of 2019 its total population is 26,825, out of which the population of Gołdap is 13,716 and the rural population is 13,109.

== Neighbouring counties ==
Gołdap County is bordered by Suwałki County to the east, Olecko County to the south, Giżycko County to the south-west and Węgorzewo County to the west. It also borders Russia (Kaliningrad Oblast) to the north.

== Administrative division ==
The county is subdivided into three gminas (one urban-rural and two rural). These are listed in the following table, in descending order of population.

Gmina	Type	Area (km^{2})	Population (2019)	Seat
Gmina Gołdap	urban-rural	361.7	20,186	Gołdap
Gmina Banie Mazurskie	rural	205.0	3,707	Banie Mazurskie
Gmina Dubeninki	rural	205.2	2,932	Dubeninki
