= Kreis Rastenburg =

Province of East Prussia in 1905

The district of Rastenburg was a district in East Prussia which existed from 1818 to 1945. Its capital was the town of Rastenburg. Already from 1752 to 1818, there was a Rastenburg district in East Prussia, which, however, encompassed a much larger area.

== History ==
=== Kingdom of Prussia ===
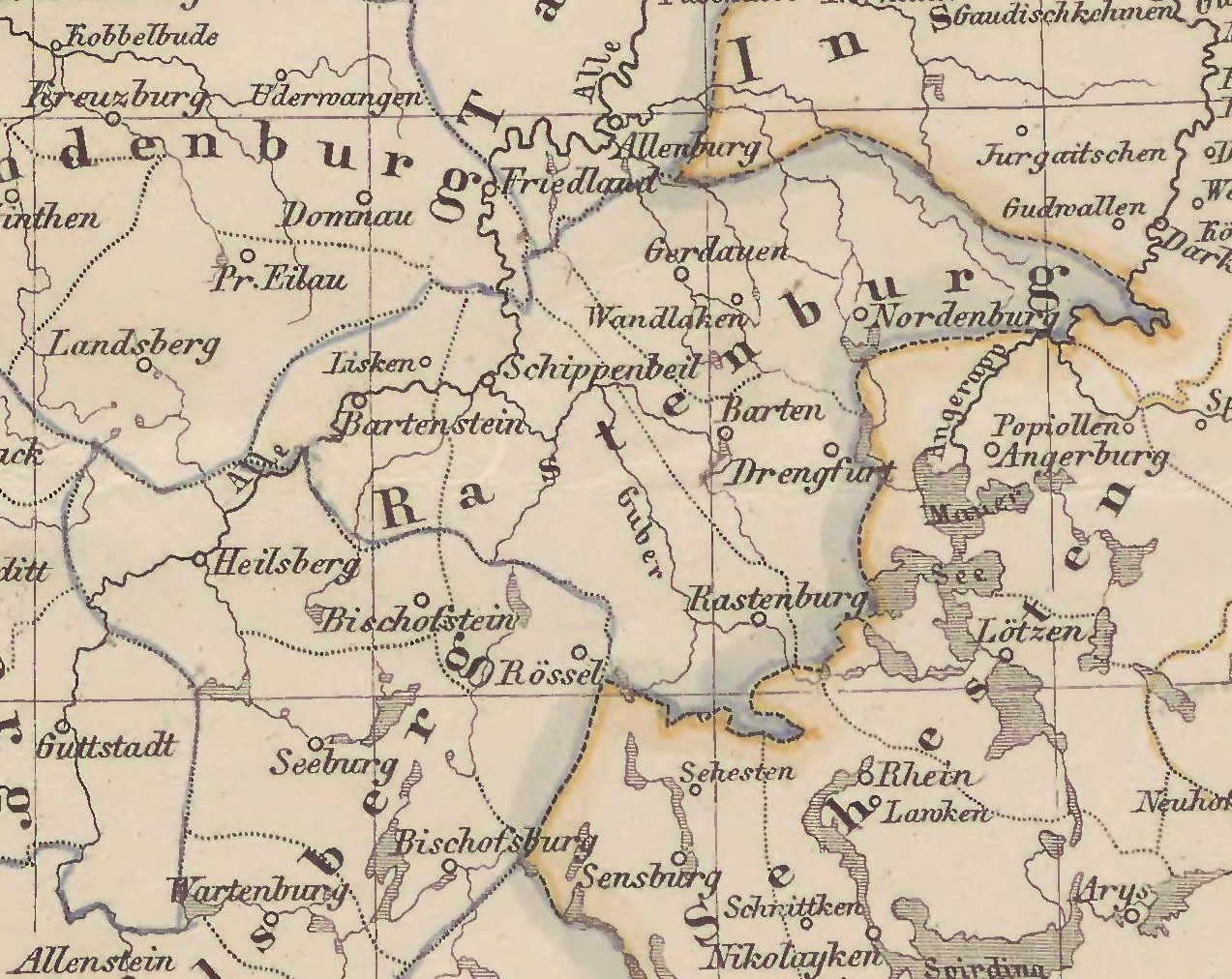
Kreis Rastenburg (1752-1818)

A comprehensive district reform was carried out in all of East Prussia, as the districts established in 1752 had proven to be inexpedient and too large. The Rastenburg district was reduced in size on February 1, 1818 and became part of Regierungsbezirk Königsberg in the Prussian province of East Prussia. It initially included the parishes of Bartenstein, Bäslack, Falkenau, Gallingen, Groß Schwansfeld, Gudnick, Lamgarben, Langheim, Leunenburg, Paaris, Rastenburg, Schönfließ-Tolksdorf, Schwarzstein and Wenden.

On April 1, 1819, the district boundaries were changed again. The parishes of Barten, Drengfurth and Groß Wolfsdorf were transferred from the Gerdauen district to the Rastenburg district and the Bartenstein, Falkenau, Gallingen and Groß Schwansfeld parishes were transferred from the Rastenburg district to the Friedland district.

=== Germany ===
From 1871, the district belonged to the German Reich.

In September 1940, not far from Rastenburg, in the Görlitzer Forest near the small town of Görlitz, the Wolf's Lair headquarters was set up under the highest degree of secrecy during the preparations for the war in the east. The Army High Command was located about 13 km to the northeast in Mauerwald on the Mauersee.

Towards the end of World War II, the district was occupied by the Red Army in January 1945. In the summer of 1945, the Rastenburg district was placed under Polish administration by the Soviets in accordance with the Potsdam Agreement, together with the southern half of East Prussia. The German inhabitants of the district were subsequently expelled by the local Polish administrative authorities.

== Demographics ==
According to the census of 1831, the district had a population of 31,501, of which 28,715 (91.2%) were Germans and 2,786 (8.8%) were Poles.

== Municipalities ==
At the time of its dissolution in 1945, the Rastenburg district contained 3 towns and 76 rural communities:

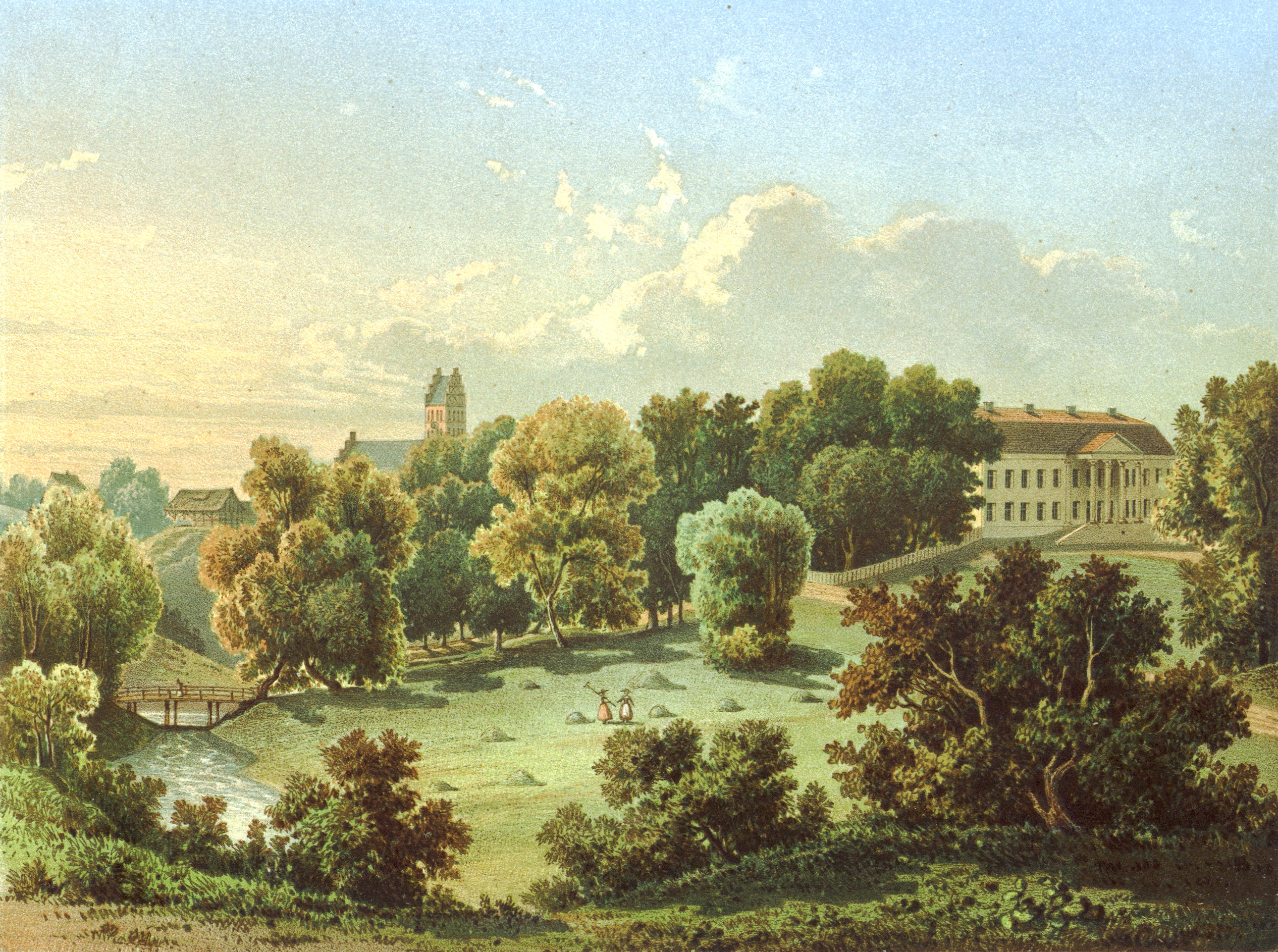
Langheim Castle around 1860, Alexander Duncker collection

- Alt Rosenthal
- Babziens
- Bannaskeim
- Barten, town
- Bäslack
- Baumgarten
- Blaustein
- Borschenen
- Bürgersdorf
- Dönhofstädt
- Drengfurth, town
- Freudenberg
- Fürstenau
- Glaubitten
- Godocken
- Groß Galbuhnen
- Groß Köskeim
- Groß Neuhof
- Groß Winkeldorf
- Gudnick
- Heiligelinde
- Jäglack
- Jankenwalde
- Kaltwangen
- Kamplack
- Karschau
- Kemlack
- Korschen
- Kotittlack
- Krausendorf
- Kremitten
- Lablack
- Lamgarben
- Langheim
- Laxdoyen
- Marienthal
- Meistersfelde
- Modgarben
- Muhlack
- Neu Rosenthal
- Neuendorf
- Paaris
- Partsch
- Pastern
- Plehnen
- Podlacken
- Podlechen
- Pohiebels
- Pötschendorf
- Prangenau
- Prassen
- Pülz
- Rastenburg, town
- Rodehlen
- Salzbach
- Sansgarben
- Sausgörken
- Scharfs
- Schlömpen
- Schönfließ
- Schrankheim
- Schülzen
- Schwarzstein
- Seeligenfeld
- Spiegels
- Stettenbruch
- Sußnick
- Taberwiese
- Tolksdorf
- Wehlack
- Weischnuren
- Weitzdorf
- Wendehnen
- Wenden
- Widrinnen
- Wilkendorf
- Wolfshagen
- Woplauken
- Zandersdorf
