= Kowalewo Małe =

- Settlement
- Location within Poland
- Coordinates: 54°9′40″N 21°2′37″E
- Country: Poland
- Voivodeship: Warmian-Masurian
- County: Kętrzyn
- Gmina: Korsze
- Population: 10

Kowalewo Małe [kɔvaˈlɛvɔ ˈmawɛ] is a settlement in the administrative district of Gmina Korsze, within Kętrzyn County, Warmian-Masurian Voivodeship, in northern Poland.
