= Chmielnik, Warmian-Masurian Voivodeship =

Chmielnik
- Village
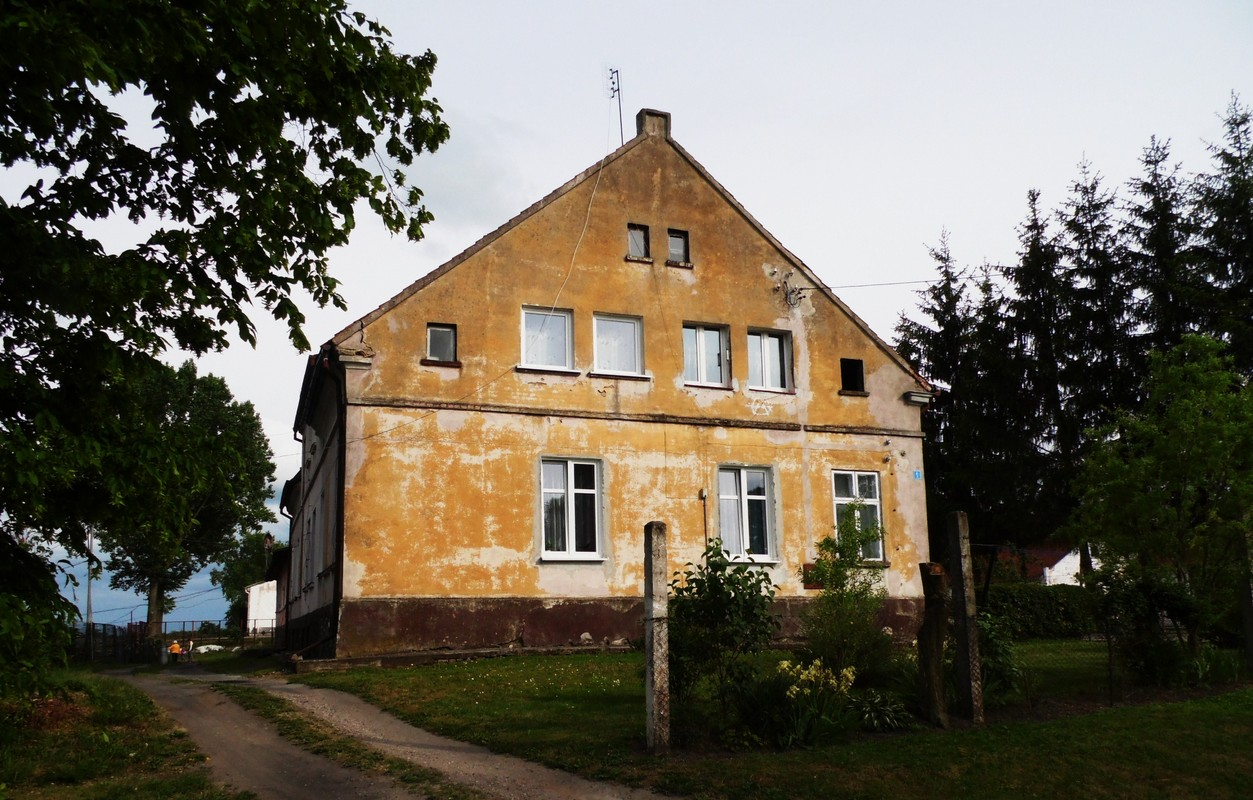

- Location within Poland
- Coordinates: 54°07′12″N 21°12′24″E
- Country: Poland
- Voivodeship: Warmian-Masurian
- County: Kętrzyn
- Gmina: Korsze
- Population: 95

Chmielnik [ˈxmjɛlnik] (German: Henriettenhof) is a village in the administrative district of Gmina Korsze, within Kętrzyn County, Warmian-Masurian Voivodeship, in northern Poland.
