= Płutniki =

Village in northern Poland

- Village
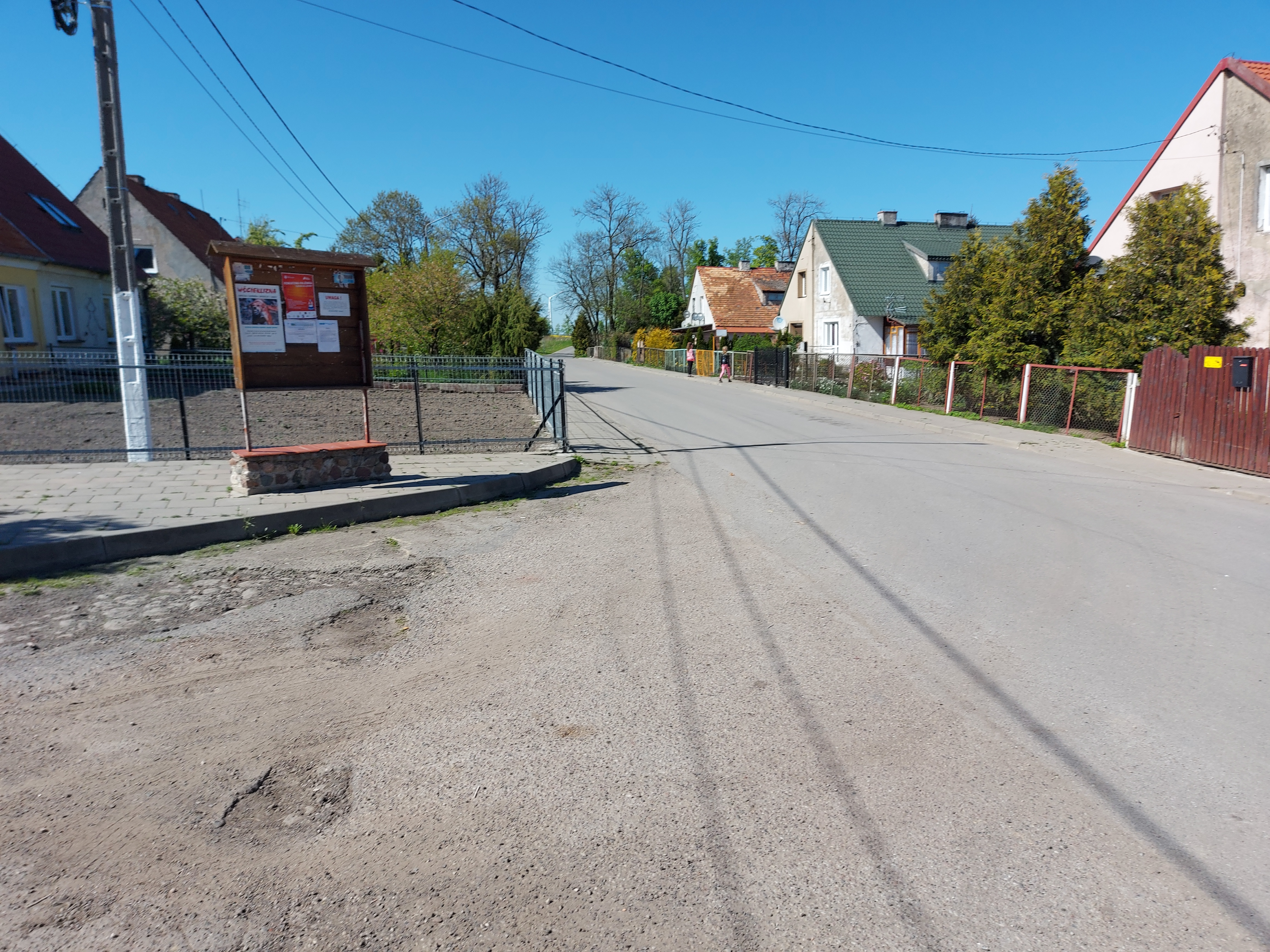

- Location within Poland
- Coordinates: 54°07′21″N 21°15′17″E
- Country: Poland
- Voivodeship: Warmian-Masurian
- County: Kętrzyn
- Gmina: Korsze
- Population: 110

Płutniki [pwutˈniki] is a village in the administrative district of Gmina Korsze, within Kętrzyn County, Warmian-Masurian Voivodeship, in northern Poland.
