= Trzeciaki, Warmian-Masurian Voivodeship =

Trzeciaki
- Village
- Location within Poland
- Coordinates: 54°06′27″N 21°06′42″E
- Country: Poland
- Voivodeship: Warmian-Masurian
- County: Kętrzyn
- Gmina: Korsze

Trzeciaki [tʂɛˈt͡ɕaki] is a village in the administrative district of Gmina Korsze, within Kętrzyn County, Warmian-Masurian Voivodeship, in northern Poland.
