= Gnojewo, Warmian-Masurian Voivodeship =

Gnojewo
- Settlement
- Location within Poland
- Coordinates: 54°08′25″N 21°02′28″E
- Country: Poland
- Voivodeship: Warmian-Masurian
- County: Kętrzyn
- Gmina: Korsze

Gnojewo [ɡnɔˈjɛvɔ] (German Grützau) is a settlement in the administrative district of Gmina Korsze, within Kętrzyn County, Warmian-Masurian Voivodeship, in northern Poland.
