= Garbno, Gmina Korsze =

Garbno
- Village
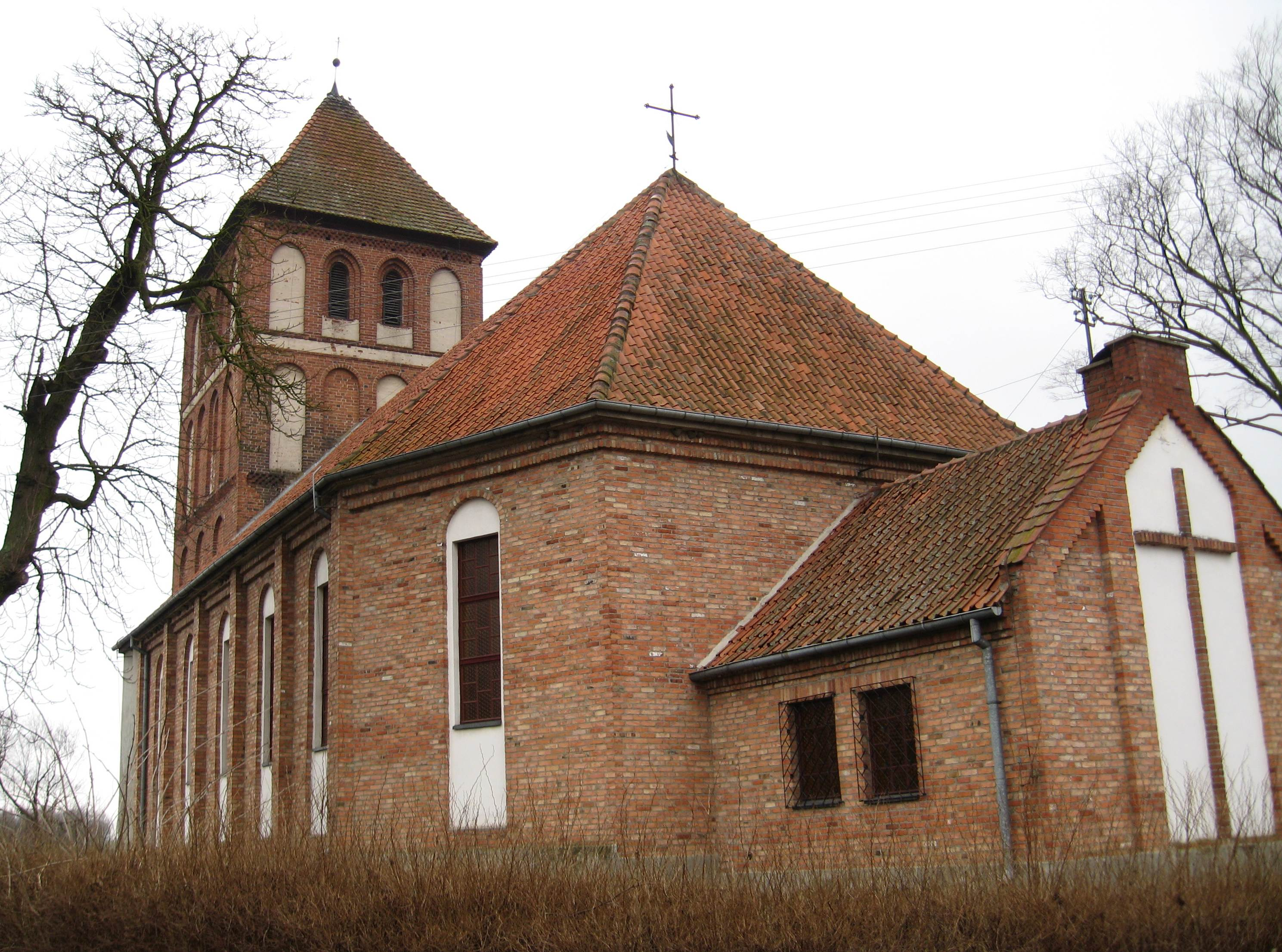
- Gothic Our Lady Queen of Poland church in Garbno

- Location within Poland
- Coordinates: 54°8′N 21°17′E
- Country: Poland
- Voivodeship: Warmian-Masurian
- County: Kętrzyn
- Gmina: Korsze

Population
  - Total: 741
- Time zone: UTC+1 (CET)
  - Summer (DST): UTC+2 (CEST)
- Vehicle registration: NKE

Garbno [ˈɡarbnɔ] is a village in the administrative district of Gmina Korsze, within Kętrzyn County, Warmian-Masurian Voivodeship, in northern Poland.

Historically, Polish-language services were held in the local church.
