= Łękajny =

- Village
- Location within Poland
- Coordinates: 54°15′07″N 21°08′03″E
- Country: Poland
- Voivodeship: Warmian-Masurian
- County: Kętrzyn
- Gmina: Korsze
- Population: 15

Łękajny [wɛnˈkai̯nɨ] is a village in the administrative district of Gmina Korsze, within Kętrzyn County, Warmian-Masurian Voivodeship, in northern Poland.
