= Wągniki, Kętrzyn County =

Wągniki
- Settlement
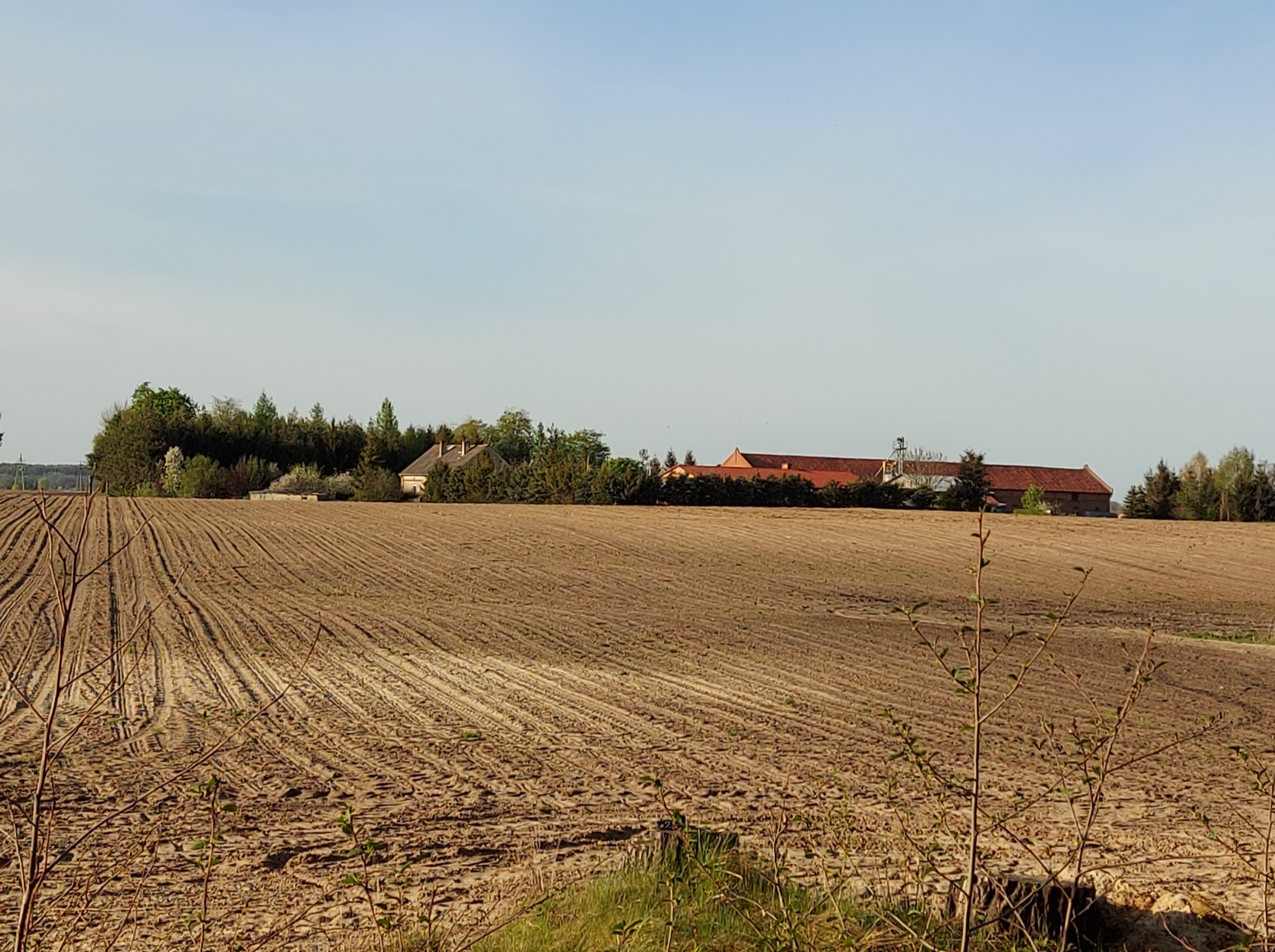

- Location within Poland
- Coordinates: 54°14′13″N 21°10′8″E
- Country: Poland
- Voivodeship: Warmian-Masurian
- County: Kętrzyn
- Gmina: Korsze
- Population: 10

Wągniki [vɔnɡˈniki] is a settlement in the administrative district of Gmina Korsze, within Kętrzyn County, Warmian-Masurian Voivodeship, in northern Poland.
