= Błuskajmy Wielkie =

- Village
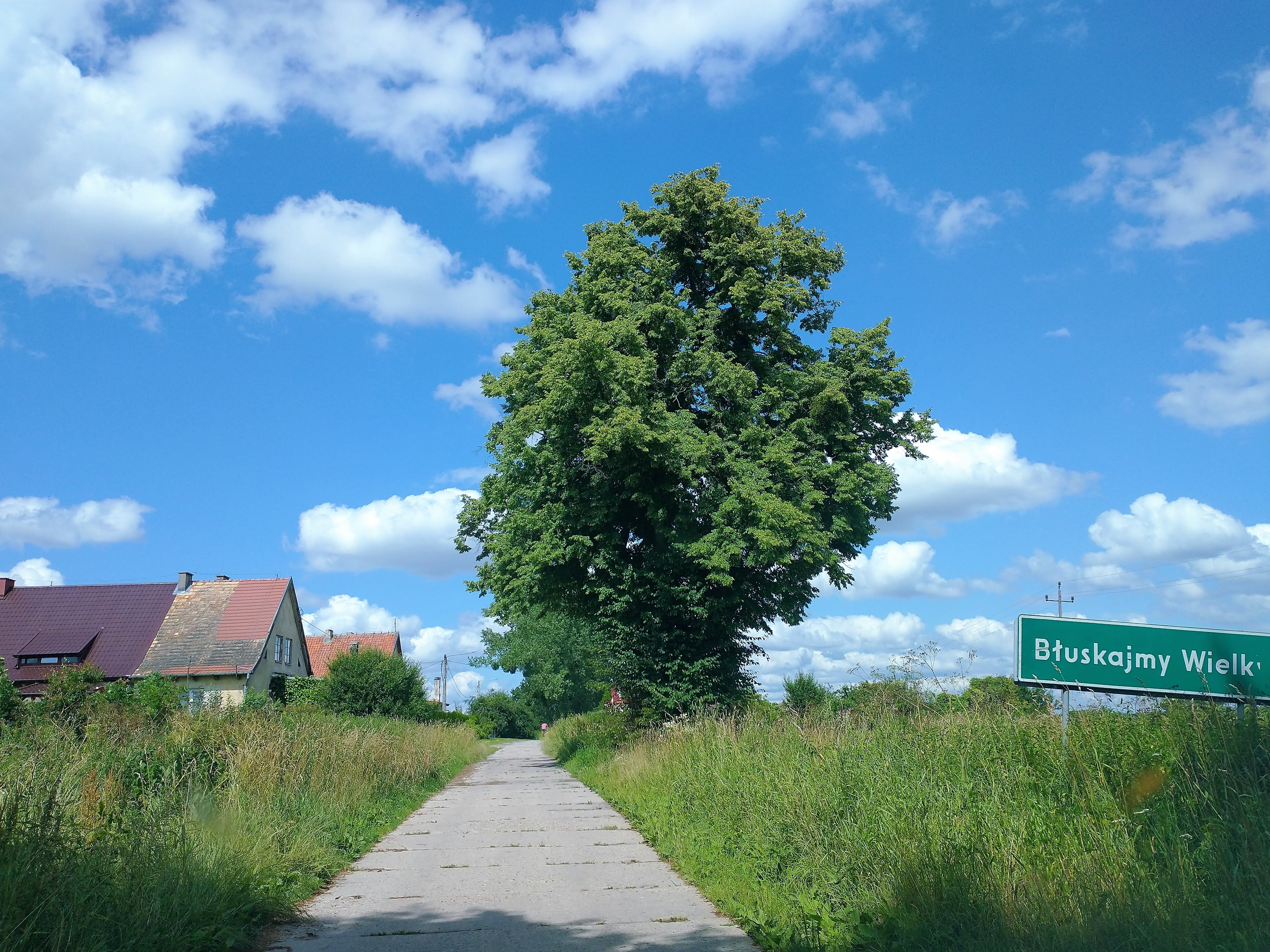

- Location within Poland
- Coordinates: 54°14′49″N 21°6′26″E
- Country: Poland
- Voivodeship: Warmian-Masurian
- County: Kętrzyn
- Gmina: Korsze
- Population: 65
- Website: http://bluskajmywielkie.pl

Błuskajmy Wielkie [bwusˈkai̯mɨ ˈvjɛlkʲɛ] (German: Groß Bloßkeim) is a village in the administrative district of Gmina Korsze, within Kętrzyn County, Warmian-Masurian Voivodeship, in northern Poland.
