= Łankiejmy =

- Village
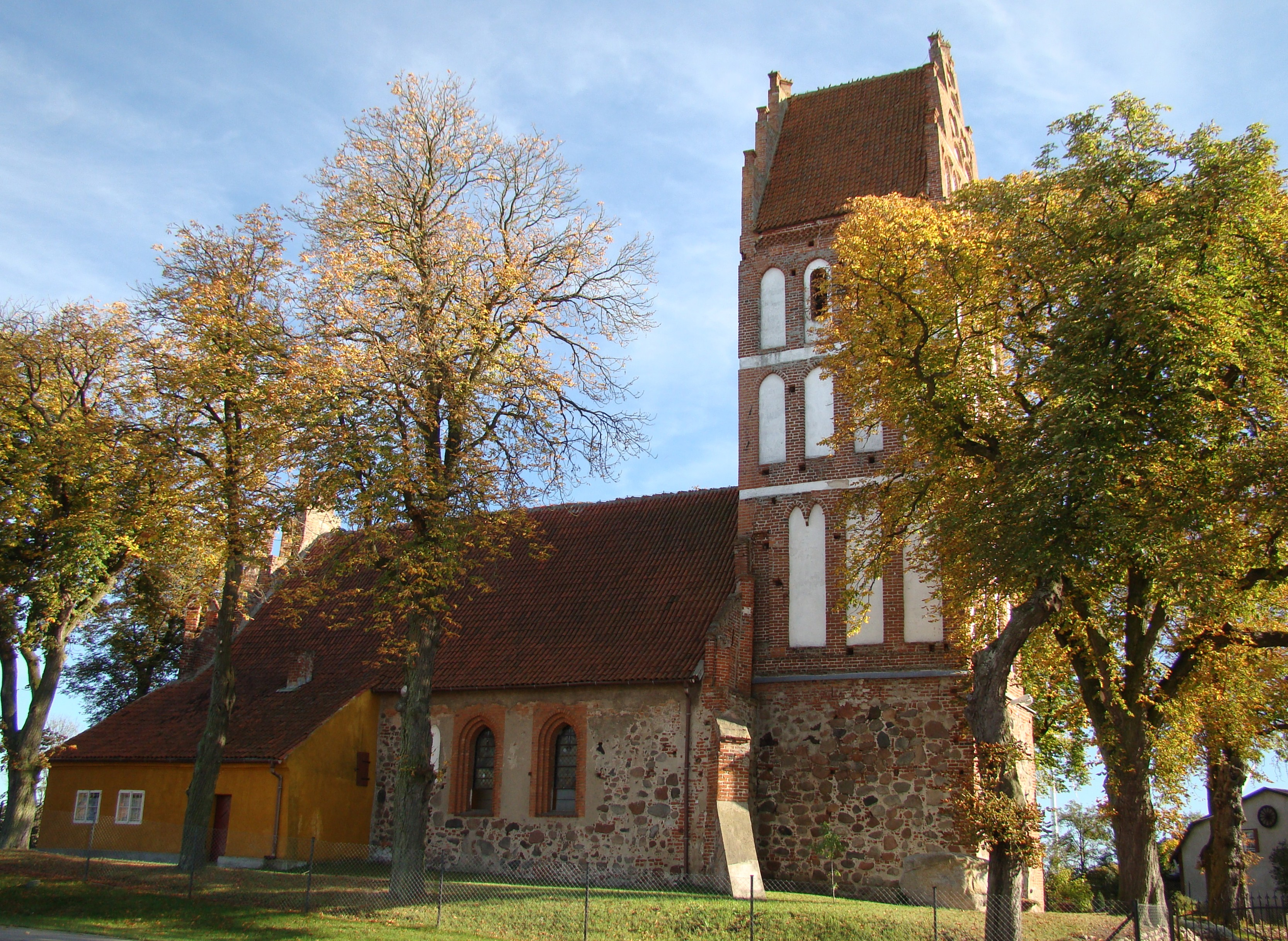
- Church of Saint John the Baptist

- Location within Poland
- Coordinates: 54°9′N 21°4′E
- Country: Poland
- Voivodeship: Warmian-Masurian
- County: Kętrzyn
- Gmina: Korsze

Population
  - Total: 505
- Time zone: UTC+1 (CET)
  - Summer (DST): UTC+2 (CEST)
- Vehicle registration: NKE

Łankiejmy [wanˈkʲɛi̯mɨ] is a village in the administrative district of Gmina Korsze, within Kętrzyn County, Warmian-Masurian Voivodeship, in northern Poland, approximately 6 km (4 mi) southwest of Korsze, 22 km (14 mi) west of Kętrzyn, and 56 km (35 mi) northeast of the regional capital Olsztyn.

== Sights ==
The landmark of Łankiejmy is the medieval Gothic church of Saint John the Baptist, built in 1380–1400.

== Etymology ==
The name is of Old Prussian origin and is derived either from its location in a meadow by a river or from the given name Lank.

== Notable people ==
- Heinrich Wilhelm von der Groeben (1657–1729), Polish colonel, died in the village
- Hans von der Groeben (1907–2005), German diplomat, born in the village
