= Wygoda, Kętrzyn County =

Wygoda
- Village
- Location within Poland
- Coordinates: 54°7′9″N 21°7′10″E
- Country: Poland
- Voivodeship: Warmian-Masurian
- County: Kętrzyn
- Gmina: Korsze
- Population: 89

Wygoda [vɨˈɡɔda] is a village in the administrative district of Gmina Korsze, within Kętrzyn County, Warmian-Masurian Voivodeship, in northern Poland.
