= Góra, Kętrzyn County =

Góra
- Settlement
- Location within Poland
- Coordinates: 54°11′44″N 21°10′15″E
- Country: Poland
- Voivodeship: Warmian-Masurian
- County: Kętrzyn
- Gmina: Korsze
- Population: 0

Góra [ˈɡura] is a former settlement in the administrative district of Gmina Korsze, within Kętrzyn County, Warmian-Masurian Voivodeship, in northern Poland.
