= Warnikajmy =

- Village
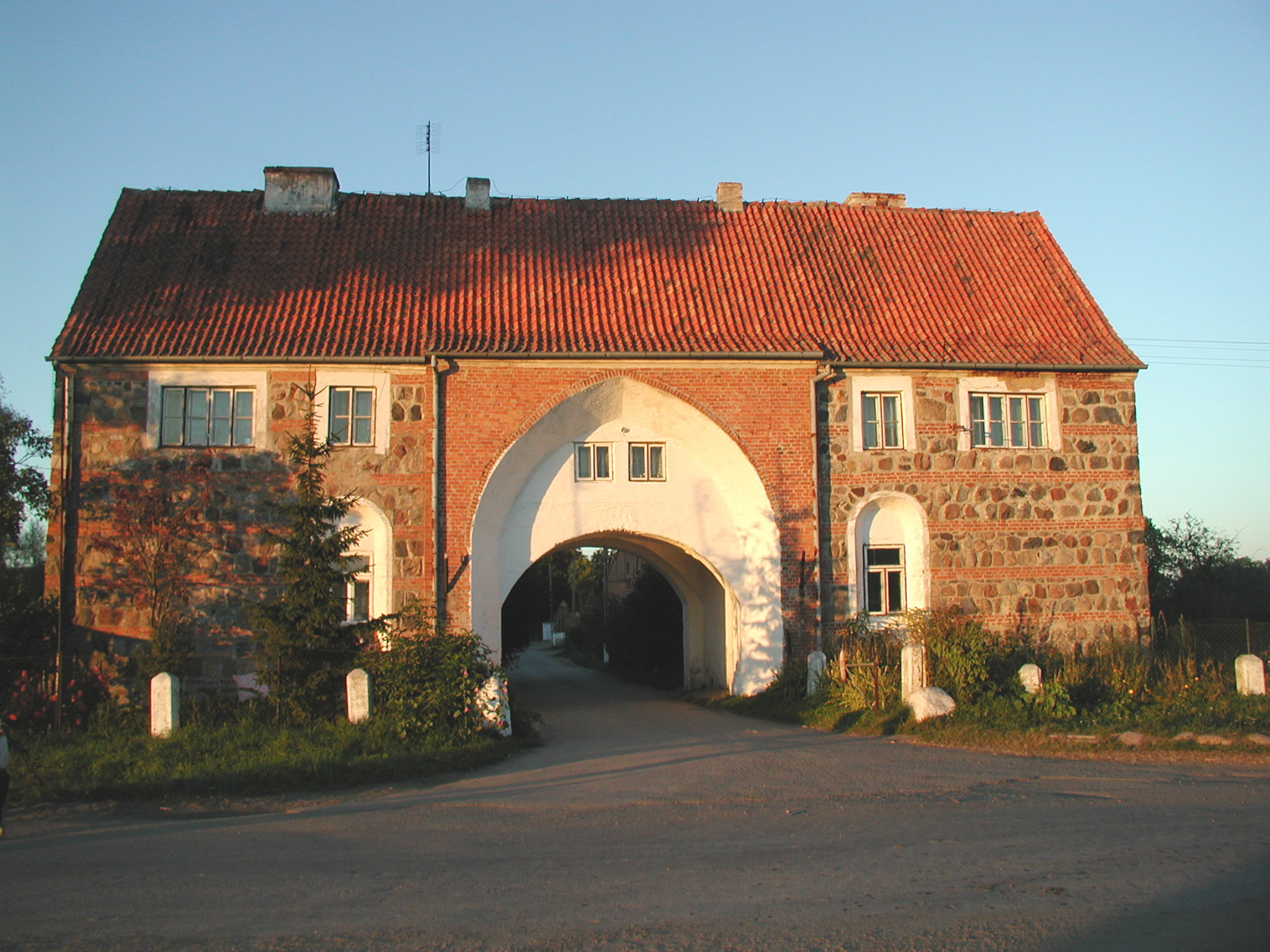

- Location within Poland
- Coordinates: 54°09′45″N 21°13′43″E
- Country: Poland
- Voivodeship: Warmian-Masurian
- County: Kętrzyn
- Gmina: Korsze
- Population: 144

Warnikajmy [varniˈkai̯mɨ] is a village in the administrative district of Gmina Korsze, within Kętrzyn County, Warmian-Masurian Voivodeship, in northern Poland.
