= Podgórzyn, Warmian-Masurian Voivodeship =

Podgórzyn
- Settlement
- Location within Poland
- Coordinates: 54°08′57″N 21°15′05″E
- Country: Poland
- Voivodeship: Warmian-Masurian
- County: Kętrzyn
- Gmina: Korsze

Podgórzyn [pɔdˈɡuʐɨn] is a settlement in the administrative district of Gmina Korsze, within Kętrzyn County, Warmian-Masurian Voivodeship, in northern Poland.
