= Starynia, Warmian-Masurian Voivodeship =

Starynia
- Village
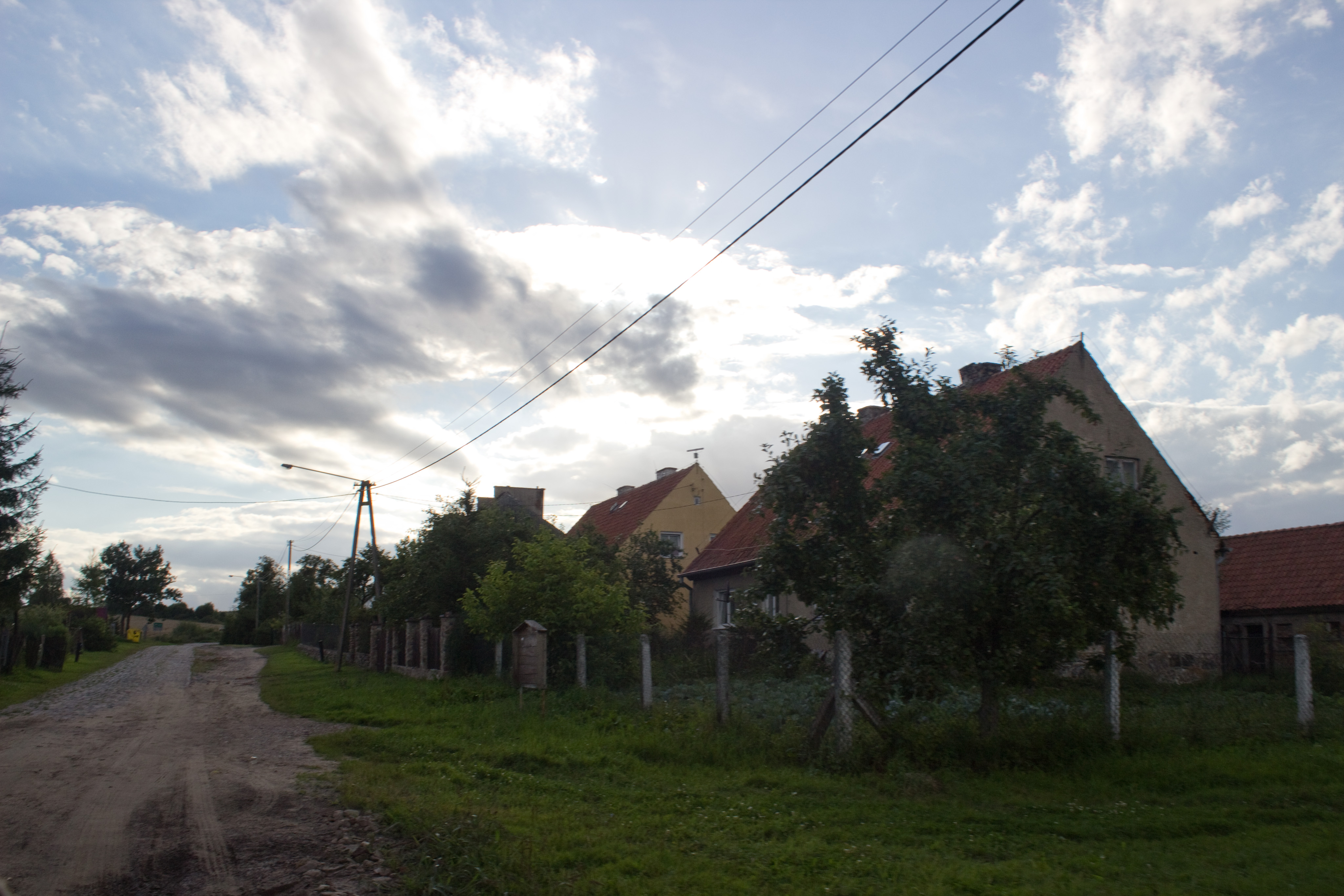

- Location within Poland
- Coordinates: 54°06′08″N 21°15′10″E
- Country: Poland
- Voivodeship: Warmian-Masurian
- County: Kętrzyn
- Gmina: Korsze
- Population: 113

Starynia [staˈrɨɲa] is a village in the administrative district of Gmina Korsze, within Kętrzyn County, Warmian-Masurian Voivodeship, in northern Poland.
