= Dzikowizna =

- Settlement
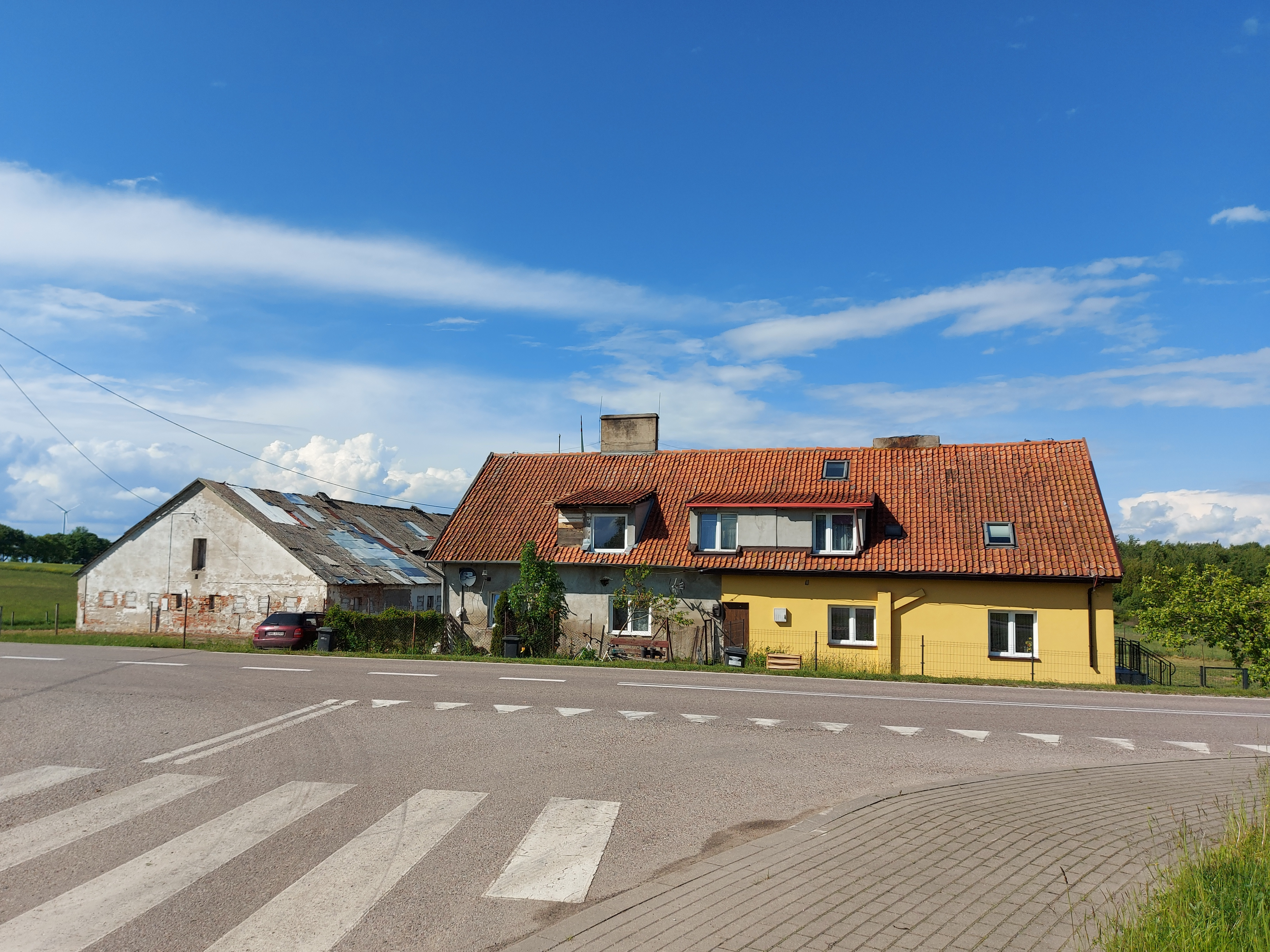

- Location within Poland
- Coordinates: 54°07′30″N 21°14′07″E
- Country: Poland
- Voivodeship: Warmian-Masurian
- County: Kętrzyn
- Gmina: Korsze

Dzikowizna [d͡ʑikɔˈvizna] is a settlement in the administrative district of Gmina Korsze, within Kętrzyn County, Warmian-Masurian Voivodeship, in northern Poland.
