= Długi Lasek =

- Village
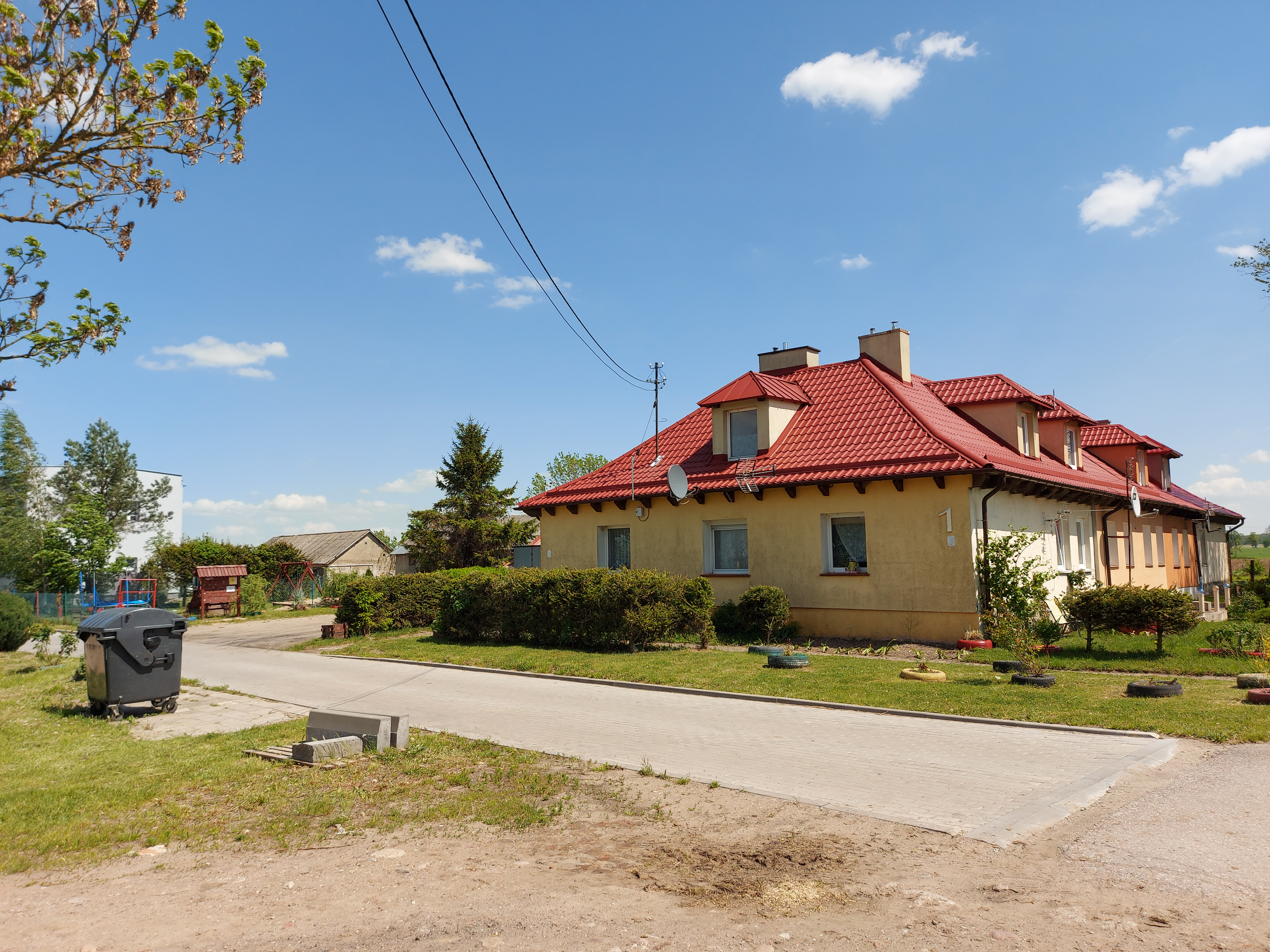

- Location within Poland
- Coordinates: 54°8′36″N 21°6′41″E
- Country: Poland
- Voivodeship: Warmian-Masurian
- County: Kętrzyn
- Gmina: Korsze
- Population: 60

Długi Lasek [ˈdwuɡi ˈlasɛk] (German: Langwäldchen) is a village in the administrative district of Gmina Korsze, within Kętrzyn County, Warmian-Masurian Voivodeship, in northern Poland.
