= Kowalewo Duże =

- Village
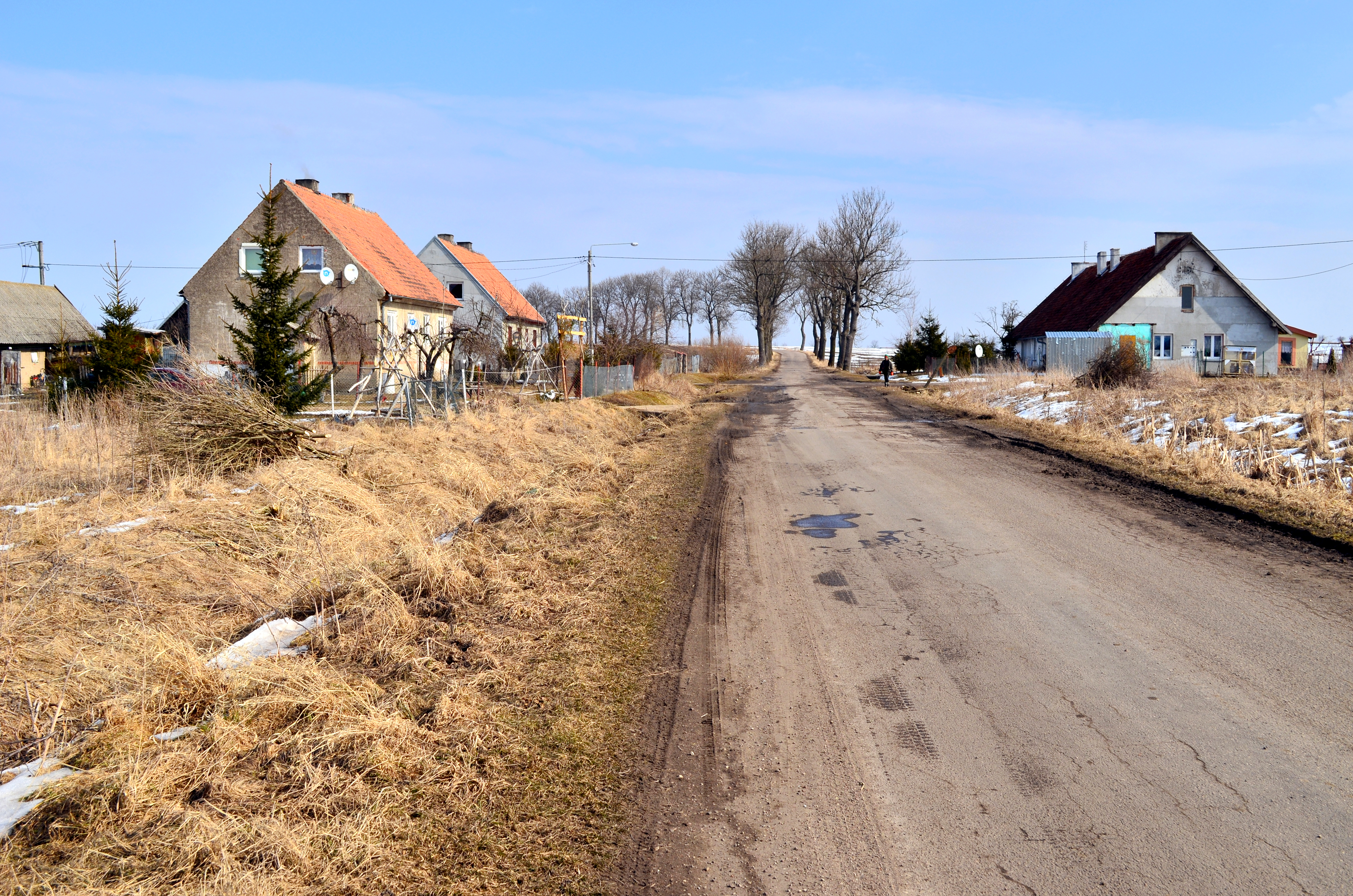
- Wayside houses in Kowalewo

- Location within Poland
- Coordinates: 54°09′10″N 21°02′43″E
- Country: Poland
- Voivodeship: Warmian-Masurian
- County: Kętrzyn
- Gmina: Korsze

Kowalewo Duże [kɔvaˈlɛvɔ ˈduʐɛ] is a village in the administrative district of Gmina Korsze, within Kętrzyn County, Warmian-Masurian Voivodeship, in northern Poland.
