= Dłużec Mały =

- Village
- Location within Poland
- Coordinates: 54°10′25″N 21°02′53″E
- Country: Poland
- Voivodeship: Warmian-Masurian
- County: Kętrzyn
- Gmina: Korsze
- Population: 107

Dłużec Mały [ˈdwuʐɛt͡s ˈmawɨ] (German: Klein Langwalde) is a village in the administrative district of Gmina Korsze, within Kętrzyn County, Warmian-Masurian Voivodeship, in northern Poland.
