= Studzieniec, Warmian-Masurian Voivodeship =

Studzieniec
- Village
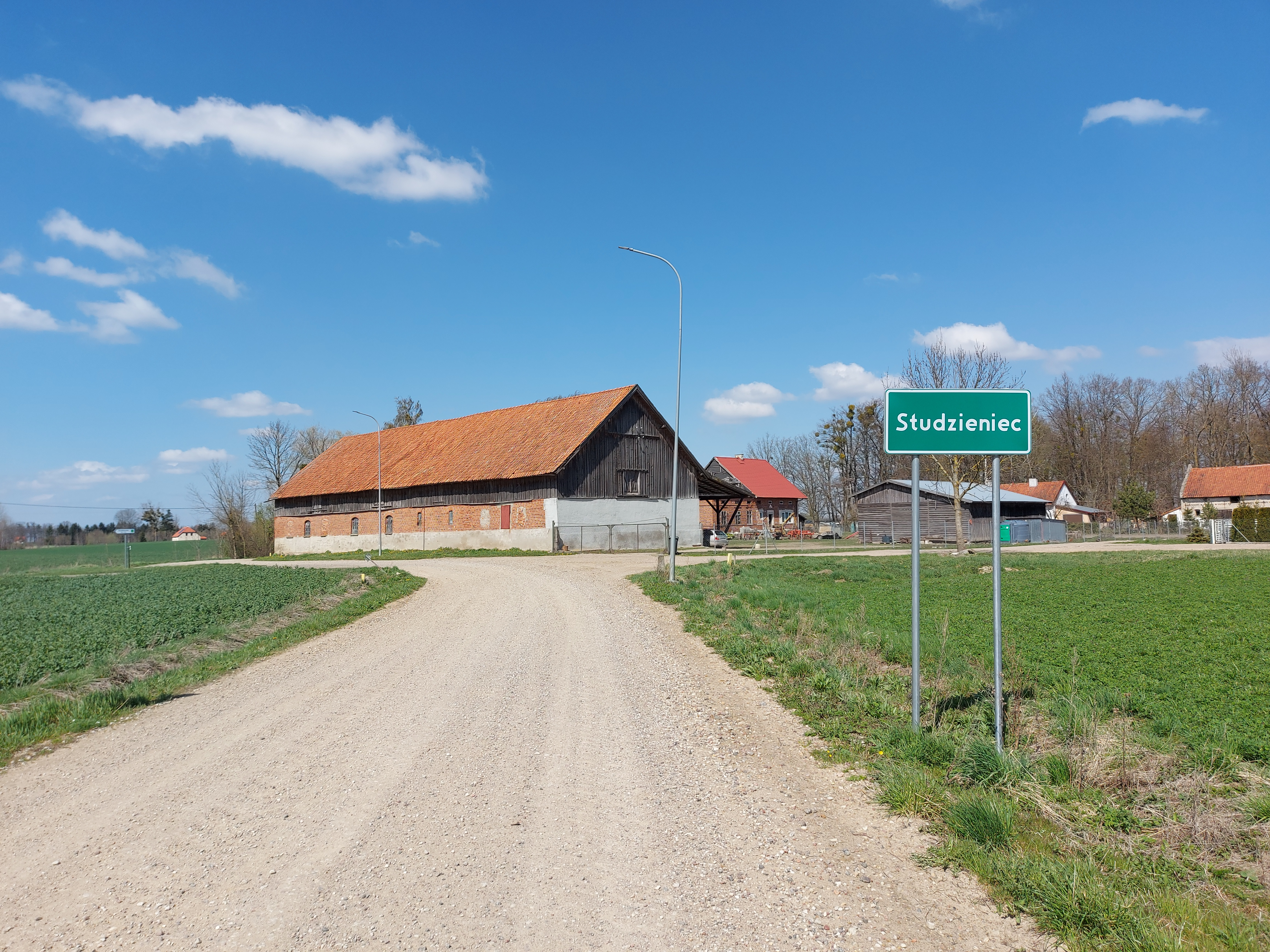

- Location within Poland
- Coordinates: 54°12′16″N 21°03′52″E
- Country: Poland
- Voivodeship: Warmian-Masurian
- County: Kętrzyn
- Gmina: Korsze

Studzieniec [stuˈd͡ʑɛɲɛt͡s] is a village in the administrative district of Gmina Korsze, within Kętrzyn County, Warmian-Masurian Voivodeship, in northern Poland.
