= Polany, Warmian-Masurian Voivodeship =

Polany
- Village
- Location within Poland
- Coordinates: 54°08′14″N 21°10′00″E
- Country: Poland
- Voivodeship: Warmian-Masurian
- County: Kętrzyn
- Gmina: Korsze
- Population: 25

Polany [pɔˈlanɨ] is a village in the administrative district of Gmina Korsze, within Kętrzyn County, Warmian-Masurian Voivodeship, in northern Poland.
