= Giełpsz =

- Settlement
- Location within Poland
- Coordinates: 54°11′55″N 21°07′21″E
- Country: Poland
- Voivodeship: Warmian-Masurian
- County: Kętrzyn
- Gmina: Korsze

Giełpsz [ɡʲɛu̯pʂ] is a settlement in the administrative district of Gmina Korsze, within Kętrzyn County, Warmian-Masurian Voivodeship, in northern Poland.
