= Gmina Korsze =

Gmina Korsze Korsze Commune
- Gmina
- Coat of arms
- Interactive map of Gmina Korsze
- Coordinates (Korsze): 54°10′17″N 21°8′28″E
- Country: Poland
- Voivodeship: Warmian-Masurian
- County: Kętrzyn
- Seat: Korsze

Area
  - Total: 249.94 km^{2} (96.50 sq mi)

Population (2006)
  - Total: 10,561
  - Density: 42.254/km^{2} (109.44/sq mi)
  - Urban: 4,632
  - Rural: 5,929
- Website: http://www.korsze.pl/

Gmina Korsze is an urban-rural gmina (administrative district) in Kętrzyn County, Warmian-Masurian Voivodeship, in northern Poland. Its seat is the town of Korsze, which lies approximately 19 kilometres (12 mi) north-west of Kętrzyn and 61 km (38 mi) north-east of the regional capital Olsztyn.

The gmina covers an area of 249.94 square kilometres (96.5 sq mi), and as of 2006 its total population is 10,561 (out of which the population of Korsze amounts to 4,632, and the population of the rural part of the gmina is 5,929).

== Villages ==
Apart from the town of Korsze, Gmina Korsze contains the villages and settlements of Babieniec, Błogoszewo, Błuskajmy Małe, Błuskajmy Wielkie, Bykowo, Chmielnik, Długi Lasek, Dłużec Mały, Dłużec Wielki, Dubliny, Dzierżążnik, Dzikowizna, Garbno, Giełpsz, Głowbity, Gnojewo, Góra, Gudniki, Gudziki, Kałmy, Kałwągi, Kamień, Karszewo, Kaskajmy Małe, Kowalewo Duże, Kowalewo Małe, Kraskowo, Krzemity, Łankiejmy, Łękajny, Marłuty, Nunkajmy, Olszynka, Parys, Piaskowiec, Płutniki, Podgórzyn, Podlechy, Polany, Pomnik, Prosna, Równica Dolna, Równica Górna, Saduny, Sajna Mała, Sajna Wielka, Sarkajmy, Sątoczek, Sątoczno, Słępy, Starynia, Stawnica, Studzieniec, Suliki, Suśnik, Tołkiny, Trzeciaki, Wągniki, Wandajny, Warnikajmy, Wetyn, Wiklewko, Wiklewo and Wygoda.

== Neighbouring gminas ==
Gmina Korsze is bordered by the gminas of Barciany, Bisztynek, Kętrzyn, Reszel and Sępopol.
