= Suliki =

Village in Warmian-Masurian Voivodeship, Poland

- Village
- Location within Poland
- Coordinates: 54°15′02″N 21°04′10″E
- Country: Poland
- Voivodeship: Warmian-Masurian
- County: Kętrzyn
- Gmina: Korsze

Suliki [suˈliki] is a village in the administrative district of Gmina Korsze, within Kętrzyn County, Warmian-Masurian Voivodeship, in northern Poland.
