= Nunkajmy =

- Village
- Location within Poland
- Coordinates: 54°10′48″N 21°06′53″E
- Country: Poland
- Voivodeship: Warmian-Masurian
- County: Kętrzyn
- Gmina: Korsze
- Population: 15

Nunkajmy [nunˈkai̯mɨ] is a village in the administrative district of Gmina Korsze, within Kętrzyn County, Warmian-Masurian Voivodeship, in northern Poland.
