= Błuskajmy Małe =

- Village
- Location within Poland
- Coordinates: 54°15′23″N 21°7′2″E
- Country: Poland
- Voivodeship: Warmian-Masurian
- County: Kętrzyn
- Gmina: Korsze
- Population: 45

Błuskajmy Małe [bwusˈkai̯mɨ ˈmawɛ] (German: Klein Bloßkeim) is a village in the administrative district of Gmina Korsze, within Kętrzyn County, Warmian-Masurian Voivodeship, in northern Poland.
