= Olszynka, Warmian-Masurian Voivodeship =

Olszynka
- Village
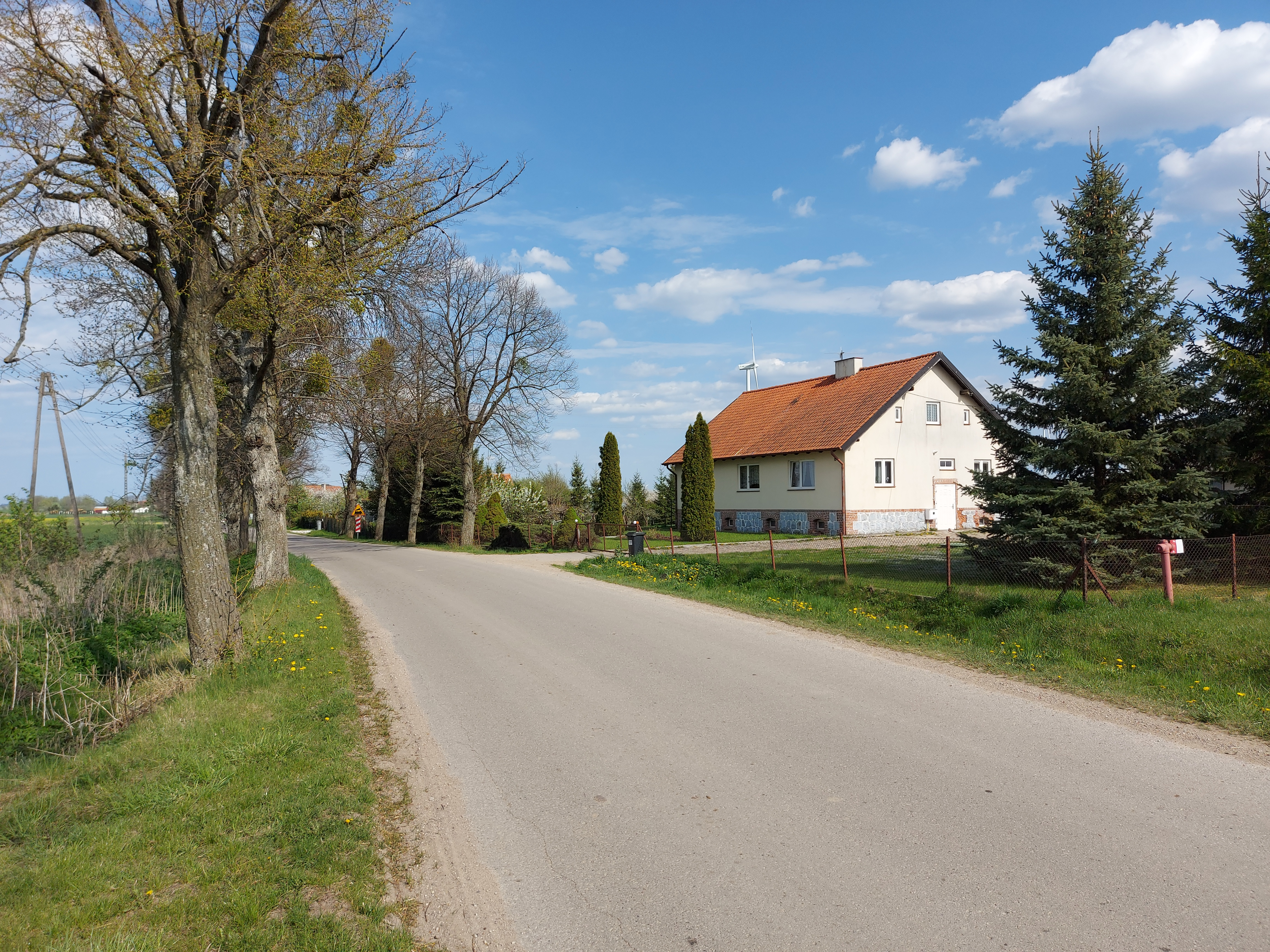

- Location within Poland
- Coordinates: 54°09′28″N 21°10′22″E
- Country: Poland
- Voivodeship: Warmian-Masurian
- County: Kętrzyn
- Gmina: Korsze
- Population: 141

Olszynka [ɔlˈʂɨnka] is a village in the administrative district of Gmina Korsze, within Kętrzyn County, Warmian-Masurian Voivodeship, in northern Poland.
