= Bykowo =

Village in Warmian-Masurian Voivodeship, Poland

- Village
- Location within Poland
- Coordinates: 54°13′N 21°6′E
- Country: Poland
- Voivodeship: Warmian-Masurian
- County: Kętrzyn
- Gmina: Korsze
- Population: 229

Bykowo [bɨˈkɔvɔ] (German: Bollendorf) is a village in the administrative district of Gmina Korsze, within Kętrzyn County, Warmian-Masurian Voivodeship, in northern Poland.
