= Saduny =

- Village
- Location within Poland
- Coordinates: 54°9′N 21°16′E
- Country: Poland
- Voivodeship: Warmian-Masurian
- County: Kętrzyn
- Gmina: Korsze

Saduny [saˈdunɨ] is a village in the administrative district of Gmina Korsze, within Kętrzyn County, Warmian-Masurian Voivodeship, in northern Poland.
