= Kaskajmy Małe =

- Settlement
- Location within Poland
- Coordinates: 54°11′43″N 21°06′06″E
- Country: Poland
- Voivodeship: Warmian-Masurian
- County: Kętrzyn
- Gmina: Korsze

Kaskajmy Małe [kasˈkai̯mɨ ˈmawɛ] is a settlement in the administrative district of Gmina Korsze, within Kętrzyn County, Warmian-Masurian Voivodeship, in northern Poland.
