= Dubliny =

- Village
- Location within Poland
- Coordinates: 54°8′N 21°16′E
- Country: Poland
- Voivodeship: Warmian-Masurian
- County: Kętrzyn
- Gmina: Korsze
- Population: 183

Dubliny [duˈblinɨ] is a village in the administrative district of Gmina Korsze, within Kętrzyn County, Warmian-Masurian Voivodeship, in northern Poland.
