= Karl Löwrick =

WW2 German Army general (1894-1945)

- Born: 8 November 1894; Podlechen, East Prussia
- Died: 8 April 1945 (aged 50); Pillau, East Prussia
- Military career
- Allegiance: German Empire; Weimar Republic; Nazi Germany
- Branch: Army
- Service years: 1912–1920 & 1936–1945
- Rank: Generalleutnant
- Commands: 93 Infantry Division; 542 Infanterie Division; 542 Volksgrenadier Division
- Conflicts: World War II
- Awards: Knight's Cross of the Iron Cross with Oak Leaves

Karl Löwrick (8 November 1894 – 8 April 1945) was a German general in the Wehrmacht during World War II, and a recipient of the Knight's Cross of the Iron Cross with Oak Leaves of Nazi Germany. Löwrick was killed on 8 April 1945 in an accident in Pillau.

== Awards and decorations ==
- Iron Cross (1914) 2nd Class (9 May 1915) & 1st Class (18 September 1917)
- Clasp to the Iron Cross (1939) 2nd Class (14 June 1940) &1st Class (20 June 1940)
- Knight's Cross of the Iron Cross with Oak Leaves
  - Knight's Cross on 5 August 1940 as Oberstleutnant and commander of III./Infanterie-Regiment 272
  - 247th Oak Leaves on 17 May 1943 as Oberst and commander of Grenadier-Regiment 272

Military offices
Preceded by General der Artillerie Horst von Mellenthin	Commander of 93. Infanterie-Division; 1 October 1943 – 20 June 1944	Succeeded by Generalleutnant Erich Hofmann
Preceded by None	Commander of 542. Infanterie-Division; 15 July 1944 – 9 October 1944	Succeeded by Renamed 542. Volksgrenadier-Division
Preceded by Previously 542. Infanterie-Division	Commander of 542. Volksgrenadier-Division; 9 October 1944 – 8 April 1945	Succeeded by None
