= Wetyn =

- Village
- Location within Poland
- Coordinates: 54°13′46″N 21°04′14″E
- Country: Poland
- Voivodeship: Warmian-Masurian
- County: Kętrzyn
- Gmina: Korsze

Wetyn [ˈvɛtɨn] is a village in the administrative district of Gmina Korsze, within Kętrzyn County, Warmian-Masurian Voivodeship, in northern Poland.
