= Dzierżążnik, Warmian-Masurian Voivodeship =

Dzierżążnik
- Village
- Location within Poland
- Coordinates: 54°09′31″N 21°04′26″E
- Country: Poland
- Voivodeship: Warmian-Masurian
- County: Kętrzyn
- Gmina: Korsze

Dzierżążnik [d͡ʑɛrˈʐɔ̃ʐnik] is a village in the administrative district of Gmina Korsze, within Kętrzyn County, Warmian-Masurian Voivodeship, in northern Poland.
