= Sajna Mała =

- Village
- Location within Poland
- Coordinates: 54°12′02″N 21°05′17″E
- Country: Poland
- Voivodeship: Warmian-Masurian
- County: Kętrzyn
- Gmina: Korsze

Sajna Mała [ˈsai̯na ˈmawa] is a village in the administrative district of Gmina Korsze, within Kętrzyn County, Warmian-Masurian Voivodeship, in northern Poland.
