= Piaskowiec, Warmian-Masurian Voivodeship =

Piaskowiec
- Village
- Location within Poland
- Coordinates: 54°10′52″N 21°07′50″E
- Country: Poland
- Voivodeship: Warmian-Masurian
- County: Kętrzyn
- Gmina: Korsze

Piaskowiec [pjasˈkɔvjɛt͡s] is a village in the administrative district of Gmina Korsze, within Kętrzyn County, Warmian-Masurian Voivodeship, in northern Poland.
