= Kamień, Kętrzyn County =

Kamień
- Settlement
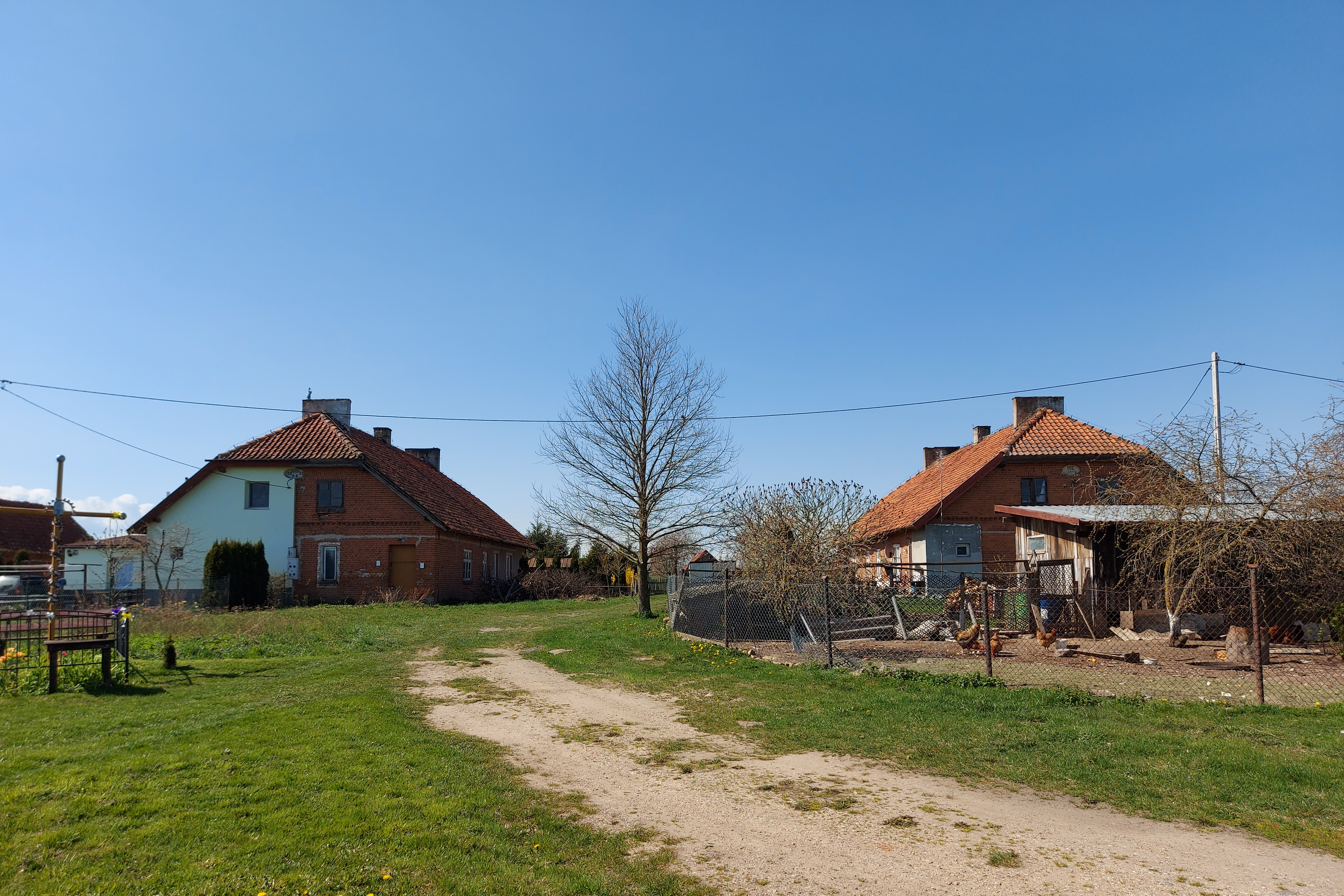

- Location within Poland
- Coordinates: 54°13′02″N 21°04′19″E
- Country: Poland
- Voivodeship: Warmian-Masurian
- County: Kętrzyn
- Gmina: Korsze

Kamień (Polish pronunciation: [ˈkamjɛj̃]) is a settlement in the administrative district of Gmina Korsze, within Kętrzyn County, Warmian-Masurian Voivodeship, in northern Poland.
