= 542nd Grenadier Division =

542nd Grenadier Division 542nd Volksgrenadier Division
- 542. Grenadier-Division; 542. Volksgrenadier-Division
- 542. Volks-Grenadier Division Vehicle Insignia
- Country: Nazi Germany
- Branch: Army
- Type: Infantry
- Size: Division

Commanders
- Notable commanders: Generalleutnant Karl Löwrick

The 542nd Grenadier Division (German: 542. Grenadier-Division) was a German military unit during World War II.

== History ==
The 542. Sperr-Division was created on 8 July 1944 as part of the 29th Aufstellungswelle in Truppenübungsplatz Stablack. On 15 July 1944, the Division was renamed 542. Grenadier-Division and sent to the Eastern Front as part of Army Group Centre.
On 12 August 1944, the unit was renamed 542nd Infantry Division, and again renamed on 9 October 1944 to 542nd Volksgrenadier Division.

The Division was pushed into the Hel Peninsula during the Soviet East Prussian offensive and surrendered in April 1945

== Commanders ==
- Generalleutnant Karl Löwrick (23 July 1944 - 8 April 1945), KIA
