= Stawnica, Warmian-Masurian Voivodeship =

Stawnica
- Village
- Location within Poland
- Coordinates: 54°13′53″N 21°6′29″E
- Country: Poland
- Voivodeship: Warmian-Masurian
- County: Kętrzyn
- Gmina: Korsze
- Population: 60

Stawnica [stavˈnit͡sa] is a village in the administrative district of Gmina Korsze, within Kętrzyn County, Warmian-Masurian Voivodeship, in northern Poland.
