= Kałmy =

- Settlement
- Location within Poland
- Coordinates: 54°11′N 21°9′E
- Country: Poland
- Voivodeship: Warmian-Masurian
- County: Kętrzyn
- Gmina: Korsze
- Population: 35

Kałmy [ˈkau̯mɨ] is a settlement in the administrative district of Gmina Korsze, within Kętrzyn County, Warmian-Masurian Voivodeship, in northern Poland.
