= Parys, Warmian-Masurian Voivodeship =

Parys
- Village
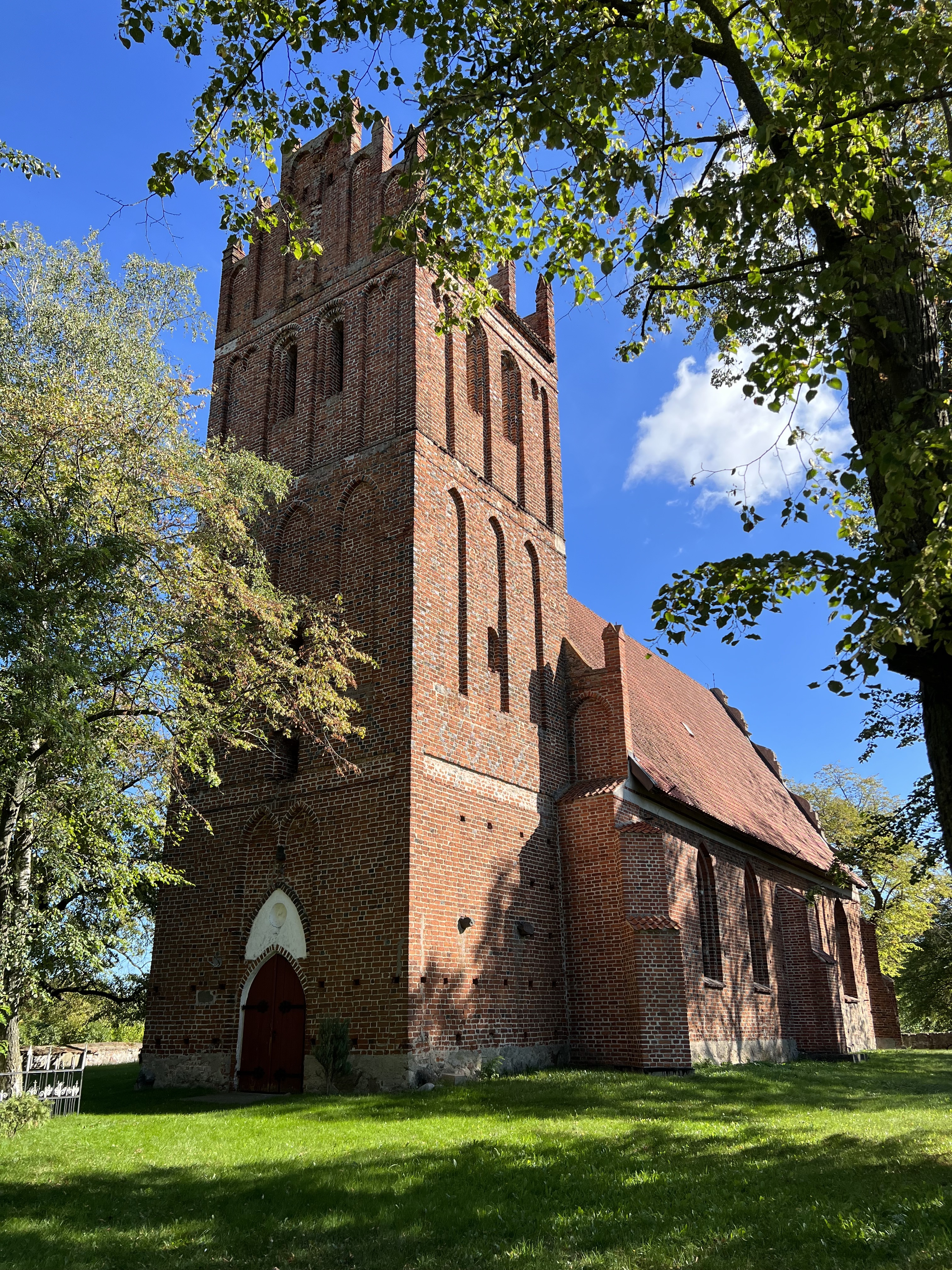

- Location within Poland
- Coordinates: 54°11′N 21°12′E
- Country: Poland
- Voivodeship: Warmian-Masurian
- County: Kętrzyn
- Gmina: Korsze

Parys [ˈparɨs] is a village in the administrative district of Gmina Korsze, within Kętrzyn County, Warmian-Masurian Voivodeship, in northern Poland.
