= Kraskowo, Kętrzyn County =

Kraskowo
- Village
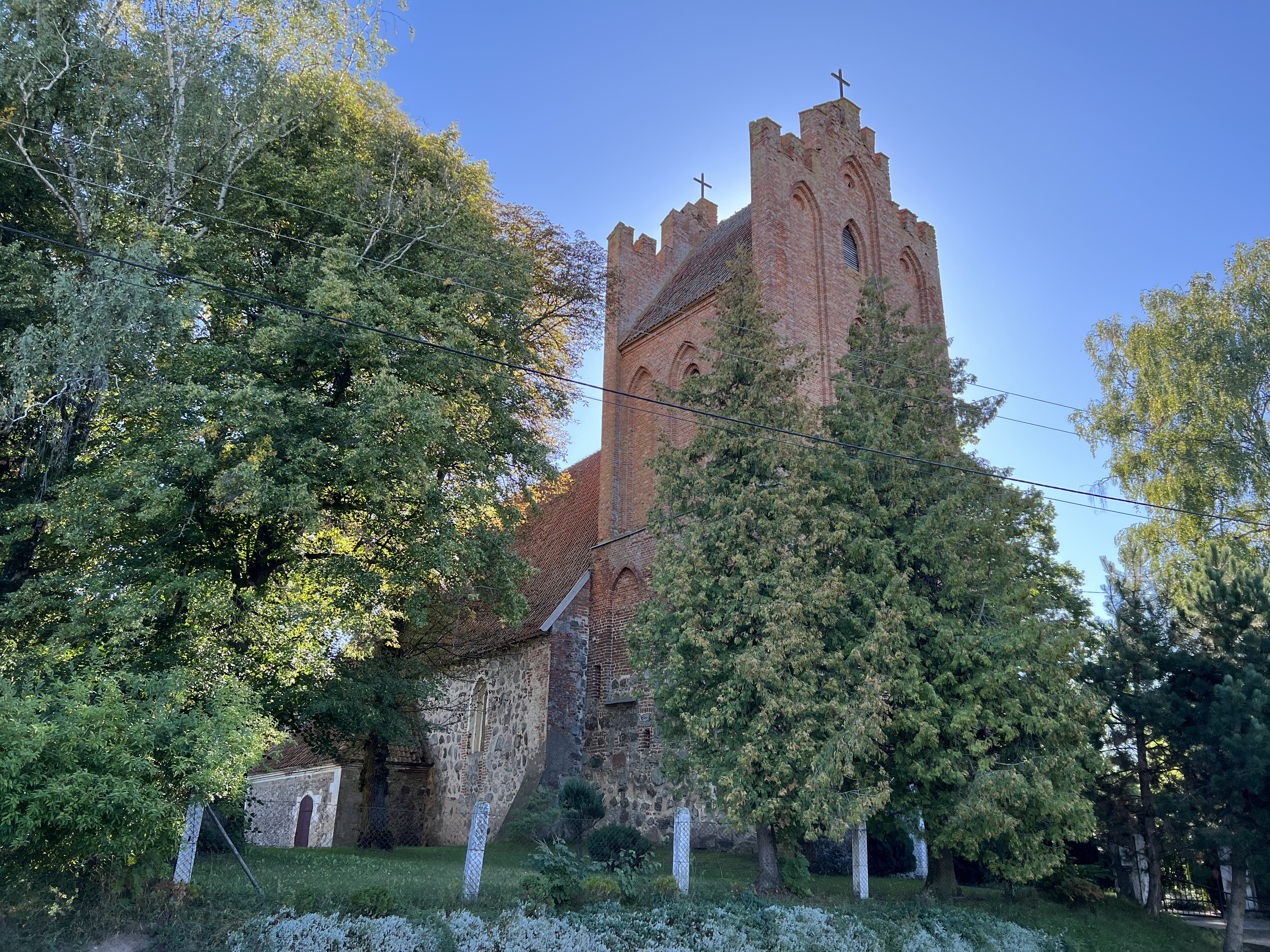

- Location within Poland
- Coordinates: 54°8′0″N 21°11′0″E
- Country: Poland
- Voivodeship: Warmian-Masurian
- County: Kętrzyn
- Gmina: Korsze
- Elevation: 102 m (335 ft)
- Population: 166

Kraskowo [krasˈkɔvɔ] is a village in the administrative district of Gmina Korsze, within Kętrzyn County, Warmian-Masurian Voivodeship, in northern Poland.
