= Karszewo, Kętrzyn County =

Karszewo
- Village
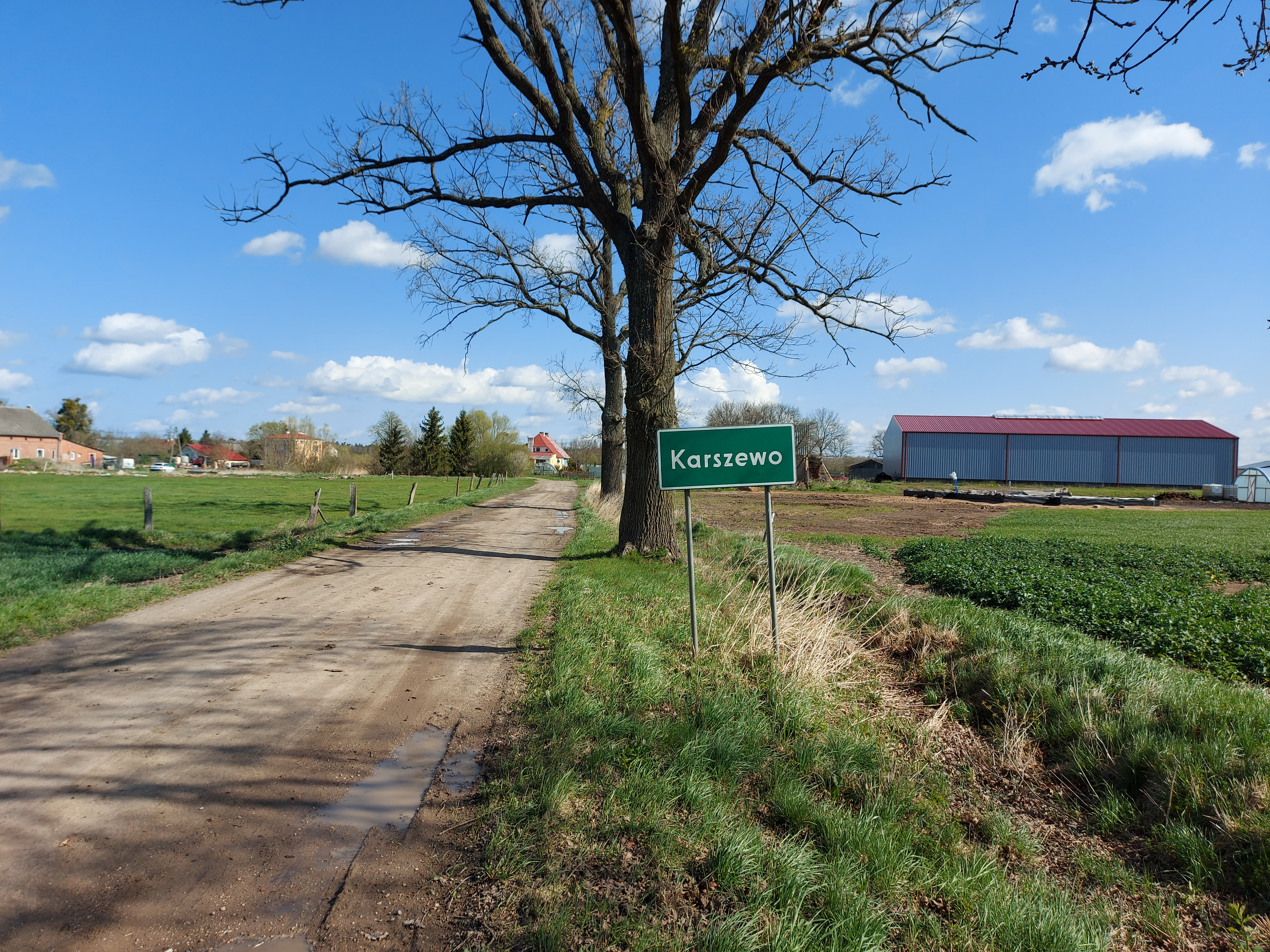

- Location within Poland
- Coordinates: 54°12′N 21°8′E
- Country: Poland
- Voivodeship: Warmian-Masurian
- County: Kętrzyn
- Gmina: Korsze

Karszewo [karˈʂɛvɔ] is a village in the administrative district of Gmina Korsze, within Kętrzyn County, Warmian-Masurian Voivodeship, in northern Poland.
