= Tołkiny =

- Village
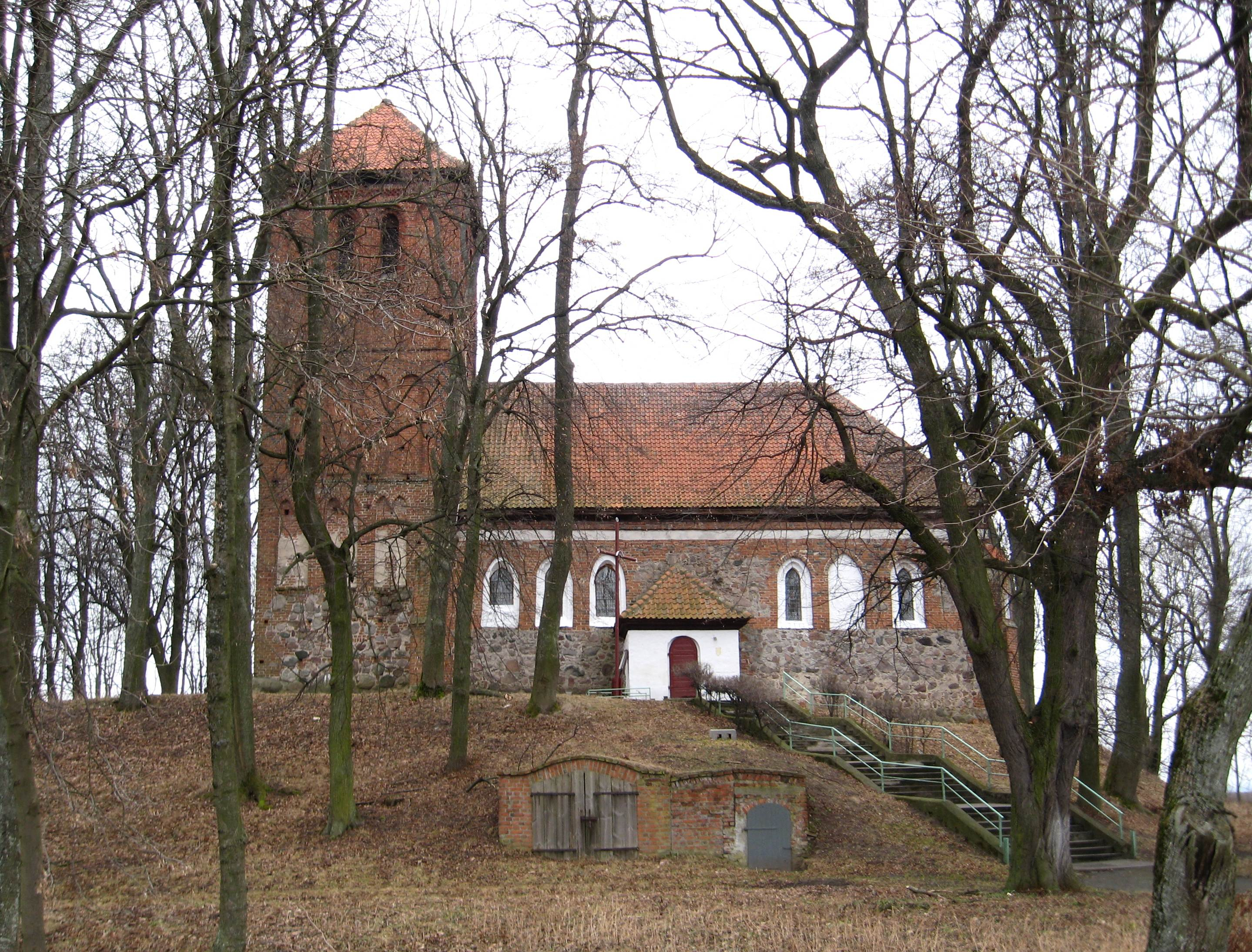
- A church in Tołkiny

- Location within Poland
- Coordinates: 54°6′30″N 21°13′13″E
- Country: Poland
- Voivodeship: Warmian-Masurian
- County: Kętrzyn
- Gmina: Korsze

Tołkiny [tɔu̯ˈkinɨ] (German Tolkynen, until 1945 Tolksdorf) is a village in the administrative district of Gmina Korsze, within Kętrzyn County, Warmian-Masurian Voivodeship, in northern Poland. According to the findings of German genealogists, the Tolkien family probably comes from Tołkiny.

== Notable residents ==
- Heinrich Graf zu Dohna-Schlobitten (1882-1944), German general and resistance fighter
