= Babieniec =

- Village
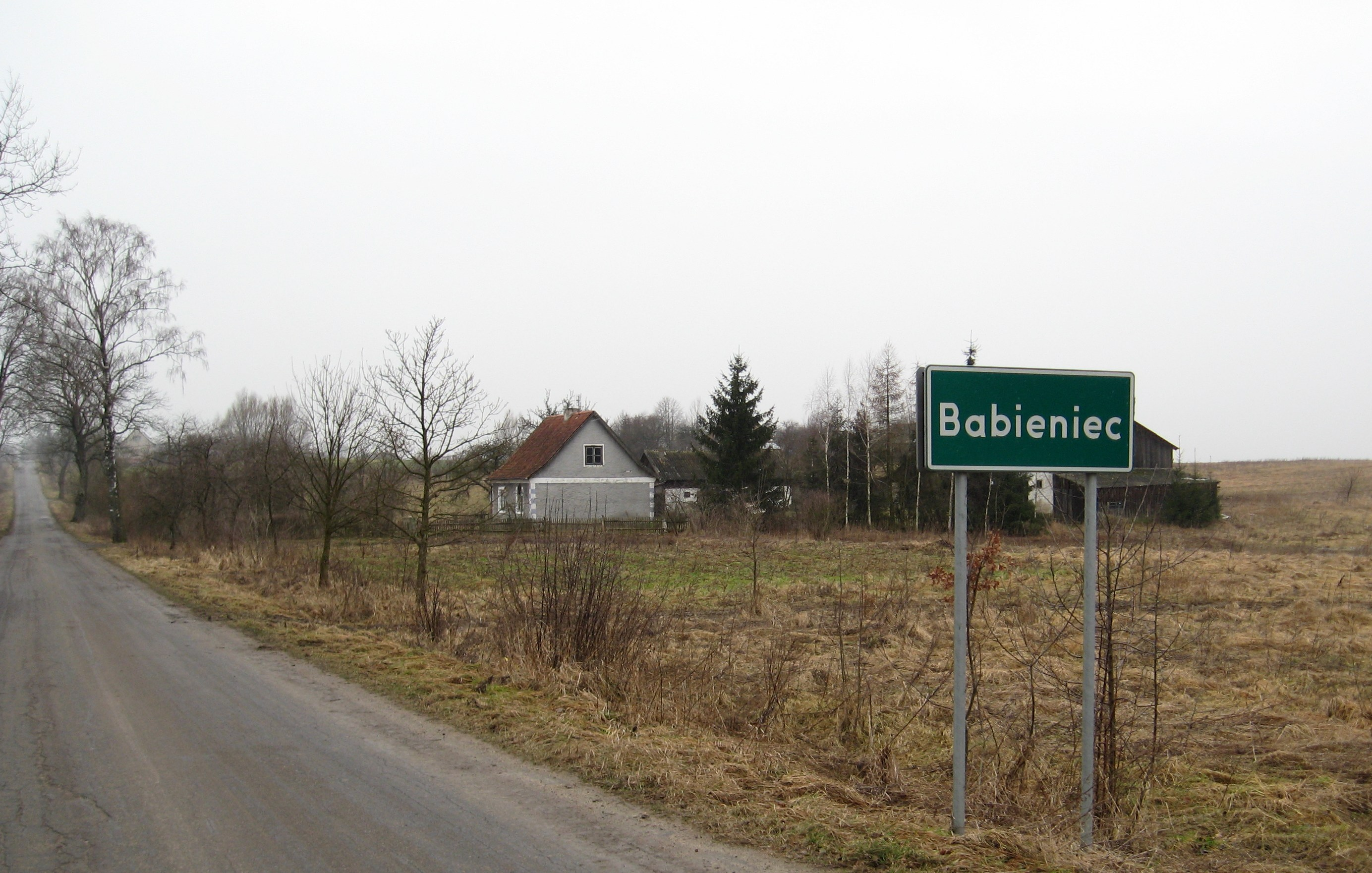

- Location within Poland
- Coordinates: 54°6′N 21°11′E
- Country: Poland
- Voivodeship: Warmian-Masurian
- County: Kętrzyn
- Gmina: Korsze
- Population: 125

Babieniec [baˈbjɛɲɛt͡s] (German: Babziens) is a village in the administrative district of Gmina Korsze, within Kętrzyn County, Warmian-Masurian Voivodeship, in northern Poland.

== Notable people ==
- Johann Dietrich von Hülsen (1693-1767), Prussian general
