= Gudniki, Kętrzyn County =

Gudniki
- Village
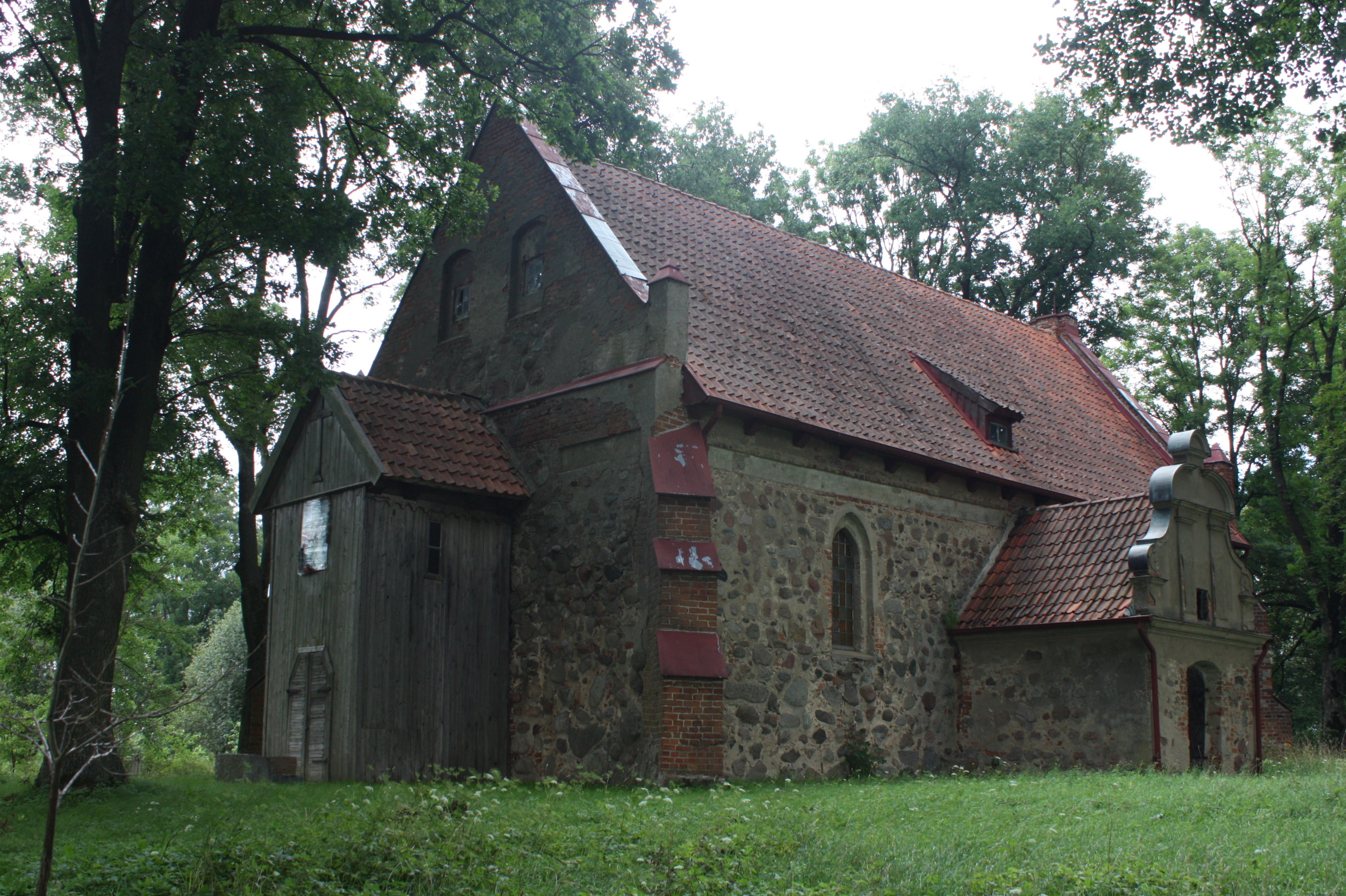
- Church of Saint Andrew Bobola

- Location within Poland
- Coordinates: 54°6′N 21°9′E
- Country: Poland
- Voivodeship: Warmian-Masurian
- County: Kętrzyn
- Gmina: Korsze

Population
  - Total: 66

Gudniki ([ɡudˈniki]; German: Gudnick) is a village in the administrative district of Gmina Korsze, within Kętrzyn County, Warmian-Masurian Voivodeship, in northern Poland.
