= Podlechy, Kętrzyn County =

Podlechy
- Village
- Location within Poland
- Coordinates: 54°9′33″N 21°8′10″E
- Country: Poland
- Voivodeship: Warmian-Masurian
- County: Kętrzyn
- Gmina: Korsze
- Population: 217

Podlechy [pɔdˈlɛxɨ] is a village in the administrative district of Gmina Korsze, within Kętrzyn County, Warmian-Masurian Voivodeship, in northern Poland.

== Notable residents ==
- Karl Löwrick (1894-1945), Wehrmacht general
