= Prosna, Warmian-Masurian Voivodeship =

Prosna
- Village
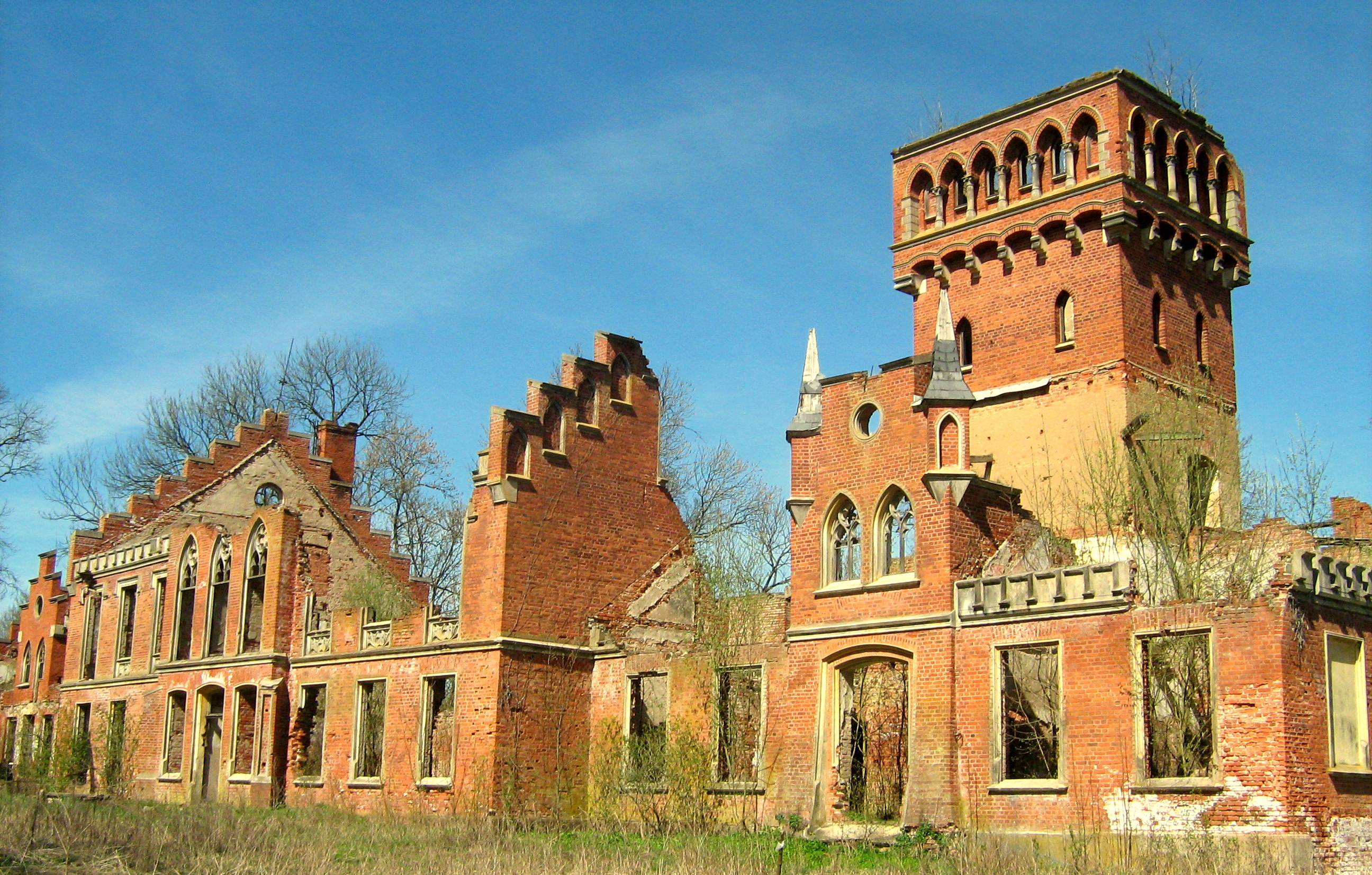
- Ruins of the palace

- Location within Poland
- Coordinates: 54°14′11″N 21°4′52″E
- Country: Poland
- Voivodeship: Warmian-Masurian
- County: Kętrzyn
- Gmina: Korsze
- First mentioned: 1376

Population
  - Total: 277
- Time zone: UTC+1 (CET)
  - Summer (DST): UTC+2 (CEST)
- Vehicle registration: NKE

Prosna [ˈprɔsna] (German: Prassen)is a village in the administrative district of Gmina Korsze, within Kętrzyn County, Warmian-Masurian Voivodeship, in northern Poland.

== History ==
The village was first mentioned in 1376 by Winrich von Kniprode as property of the Leunenburg family. In 1454, King Casimir IV Jagiellon incorporated the region into the Kingdom of Poland. After the subsequent Thirteen Years' War (1454–1466), it was a part of Poland as a fief held by the Teutonic Order. In 1490 Barbara von Leunenburg married Botho von Eulenburg and the village from then on remained the property of the von Eulenburg family until 1945.

The palace was initially built in 1610–1620 and restructured by the Polish brethren Józef Naronowicz-Naroński in 1667–68. A last major reconstruction happened in the 1860s in Neogothic style; the tower was added in 1875. The palace was not destroyed throughout World War II but is ruined today.
