= Wandajny =

- Village
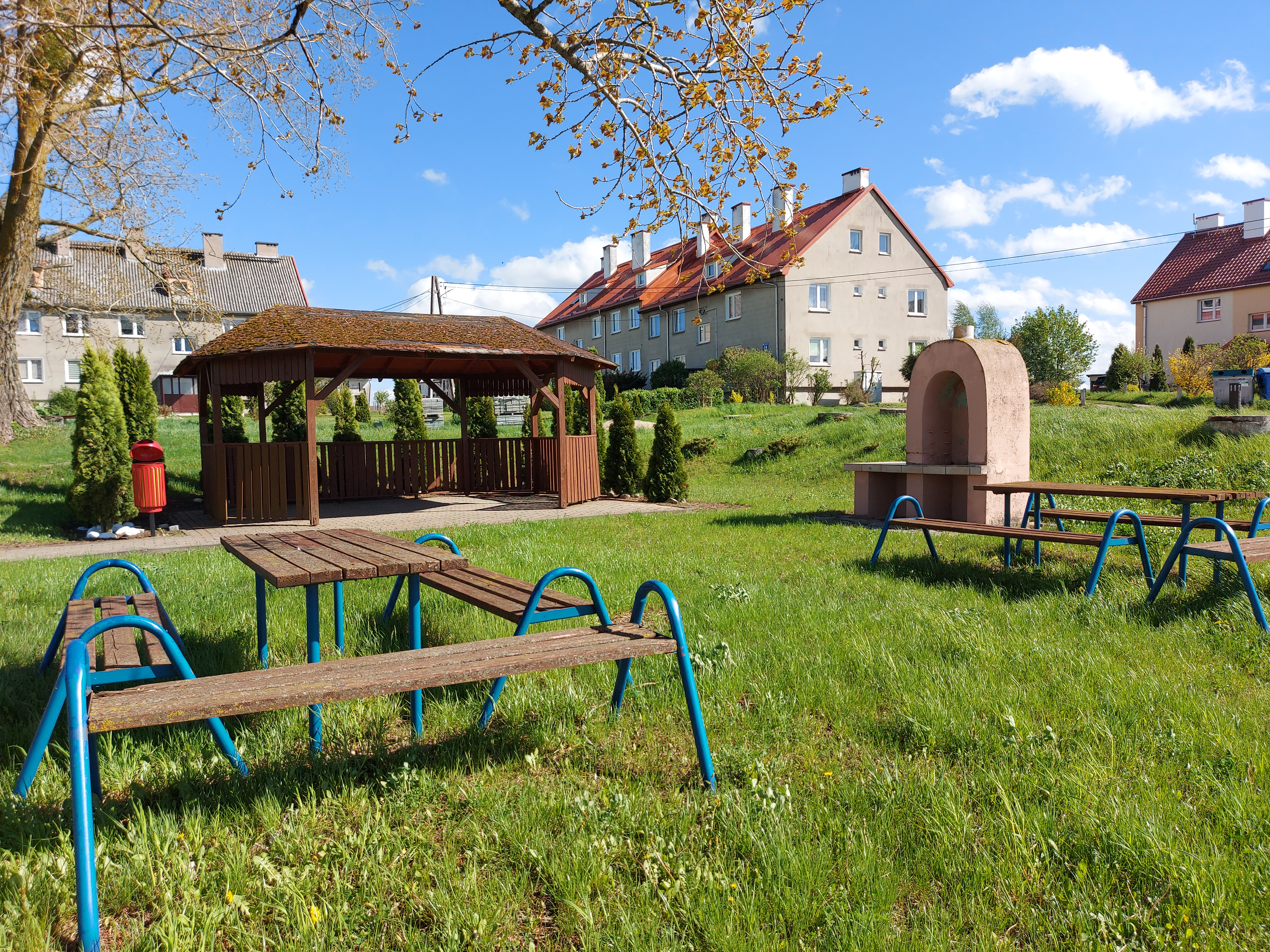

- Location within Poland
- Coordinates: 54°8′N 21°7′E
- Country: Poland
- Voivodeship: Warmian-Masurian
- County: Kętrzyn
- Gmina: Korsze
- Population: 386

Wandajny [vanˈdai̯nɨ] is a village in the administrative district of Gmina Korsze, within Kętrzyn County, Warmian-Masurian Voivodeship, in northern Poland.
