= Błogoszewo =

- Village
- Location within Poland
- Coordinates: 54°9′N 21°12′E
- Country: Poland
- Voivodeship: Warmian-Masurian
- County: Kętrzyn
- Gmina: Korsze
- Population: 39

Błogoszewo [bwɔɡɔˈʂɛvɔ] (German: Seeligenfeld) is a village in the administrative district of Gmina Korsze, within Kętrzyn County, Warmian-Masurian Voivodeship, in northern Poland. In 1975–1998, the town was administratively part of the Olsztyn province. In 1973, Błogoszewo and Warnikajma villages belonged to the village of Błogoszewo.
