= Korsze =

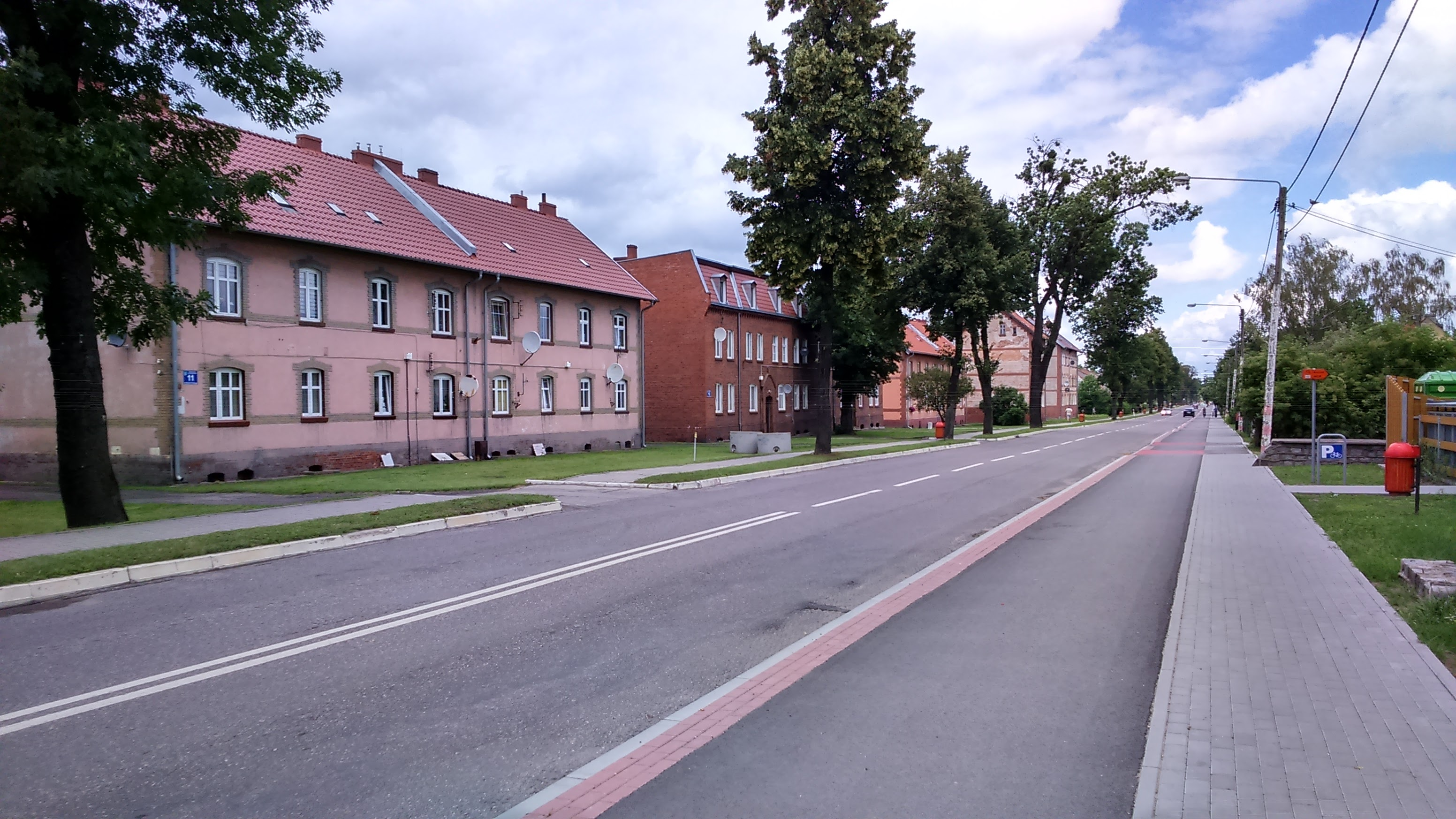

- Flag Coat of arms

- Location within Poland
- Coordinates: 54°10′17″N 21°8′28″E
- Country: Poland
- Voivodeship: Warmian-Masurian
- County: Kętrzyn
- Gmina: Korsze

Area
  - Total: 4.03 km^{2} (1.56 sq mi)

Population (2022)
  - Total: 4,005
  - Density: 994/km^{2} (2,570/sq mi)
- Time zone: UTC+1 (CET)
  - Summer (DST): UTC+2 (CEST)
- Postal code: 11-430
- Vehicle registration: NKE
- Website: https://korsze.pl/

Korsze ([ˈkɔrʂɛ]; German: Korschen) is a town in Kętrzyn County, Warmian-Masurian Voivodeship, in north-eastern Poland, with 4,005 inhabitants (2022). It is a railroad junction, located along the major Olsztyn-Skandawa line and Ełk-Bartoszyce line.

Korsze is home to three historic water towers from the 1900s. One of the water towers is a Klönne-type water tower, of which only three exist.

Four Polish citizens were murdered by Nazi Germany in the settlement during World War II.

== Notable residents ==
- Krzysztof Raczkowski,
