= Sławkowo, Kętrzyn County =

Sławkowo
- Village
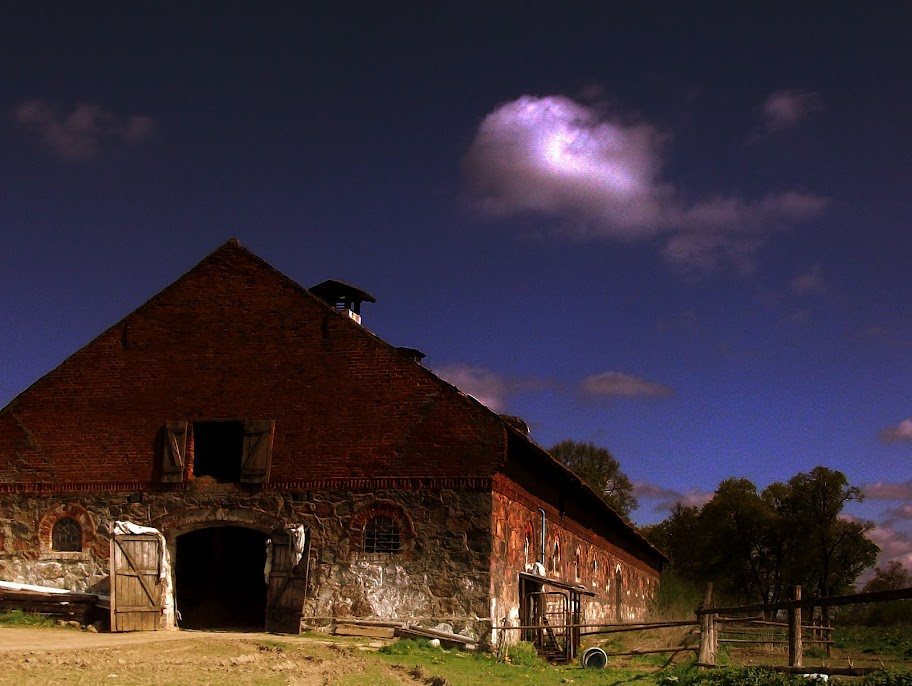

- Location within Poland
- Coordinates: 54°02′13″N 21°23′16″E
- Country: Poland
- Voivodeship: Warmian-Masurian
- County: Kętrzyn
- Gmina: Kętrzyn
- Time zone: UTC+1 (CET)
  - Summer (DST): UTC+2 (CEST)
- Vehicle registration: NKE

Sławkowo [swafˈkɔvɔ] is a village in the administrative district of Gmina Kętrzyn, within Kętrzyn County, Warmian-Masurian Voivodeship, in northern Poland.

== Location ==
Sławkowo is located in the north-central part of the Warmian–Masurian Voivodeship, about 5 kilometres (3 mi) south of the town of Kętrzyn.

== History ==
Sławkowo was established in 1407 as an estate known as Reimsdorff before 1772 and Rheimsdorf after 1772. In 1785, it was recorded as a "royal manor" with five households, and in 1820 as a "noble manor" with five households and a population of 109.

In 1874, the Reimsdorf estate was incorporated into the Rastenburg Estate administrative district in the Province of East Prussia. Reimsdorf had 133 inhabitants in 1885 and 187 in 1910.

On 30 September 1928, the Reimsdorf estate district, the rural municipality of Groß Bürgersdorf (Polish: Poganowo), and the estate districts of Hinzenhof (Zalesie Kętrzyńskie) and Klein Bürgersdorf (Poganówko) were merged to form the new rural municipality of Bürgersdorf.

Following the transfer of southern East Prussia to Poland in 1945, Reimsdorf was renamed Sławkowo. Administratively it was part of the Masurian District until 1946, and then the Olsztyn Voivodeship until 1998.
