= Brzeźnica =

Brzeźnica may refer to the following places in Poland:

- Brzeźnica, Greater Poland Voivodeship (west-central Poland)
- Brzeźnica, Bochnia County in Lesser Poland Voivodeship (south Poland)
- Brzeźnica, Tarnów County in Lesser Poland Voivodeship (south Poland)
- Brzeźnica, Wadowice County in Lesser Poland Voivodeship (south Poland)
- Brzeźnica, Łódź Voivodeship (central Poland)
- Brzeźnica, Lower Silesian Voivodeship (south-west Poland)
- Brzeźnica, Krosno County in Lubusz Voivodeship (west Poland)
- Brzeźnica, Żagań County in Lubusz Voivodeship (west Poland)
- Brzeźnica, Masovian Voivodeship (east-central Poland)
- Brzeźnica, Opole Voivodeship (south-west Poland)
- Brzeźnica, Podkarpackie Voivodeship (south-east Poland)
- Brzeźnica, Podlaskie Voivodeship (north-east Poland)
- Brzeźnica, Świętokrzyskie Voivodeship (south-central Poland)
- Brzeźnica, Silesian Voivodeship (south Poland)
- Brzeźnica, Gmina Kętrzyn in Warmian-Masurian Voivodeship (north Poland)
- Brzeźnica, Gmina Srokowo in Warmian-Masurian Voivodeship (north Poland)
- Brzeźnica, Szczecinek County in West Pomeranian Voivodeship (north-west Poland)
- Nowa Brzeźnica in Łódź Voivodeship (central Poland)
- Brzeźnica (hill), in the Vidnava Lowland
