= Smokowo, Warmian-Masurian Voivodeship =

Smokowo
- Village
- Location within Poland
- Coordinates: 54°03′58″N 21°18′47″E
- Country: Poland
- Voivodeship: Warmian-Masurian
- County: Kętrzyn
- Gmina: Kętrzyn
- Population: 435
- Time zone: UTC+01:00 (CET)
  - Summer (DST): UTC+02:00 (CEST)

Smokowo [smɔˈkɔvɔ] (German: Drachenstein) is a village in the administrative district of Gmina Kętrzyn, within Kętrzyn County, Warmian-Masurian Voivodeship, in northern Poland.
