= Alksnėnai =

Alksnėnai (from Lithuanian alder groves) may refer to several Lithuanian villages:

- Alksnėnai, Gudžiūnai, in Gudžiūnai Eldership of Kėdainiai District Municipality
- Alksnėnai, Vilainiai, in Vilainiai Eldership of Kėdainiai District Municipality
- Alksnėnai, Plungė, in Šateikiai eldership of Plungė District Municipality
- Alksnėnai, Vilkaviškis, in Vilkaviškis District Municipality; see List of Catholic pilgrimage sites in Lithuania

== See also ==
- Alksnynė, a settlement in the Lithuanian part of the Curonian Spit
- Olchowo (disambiguation)
- Olkhovka
