= Czerniki, Warmian-Masurian Voivodeship =

Czerniki
- Village
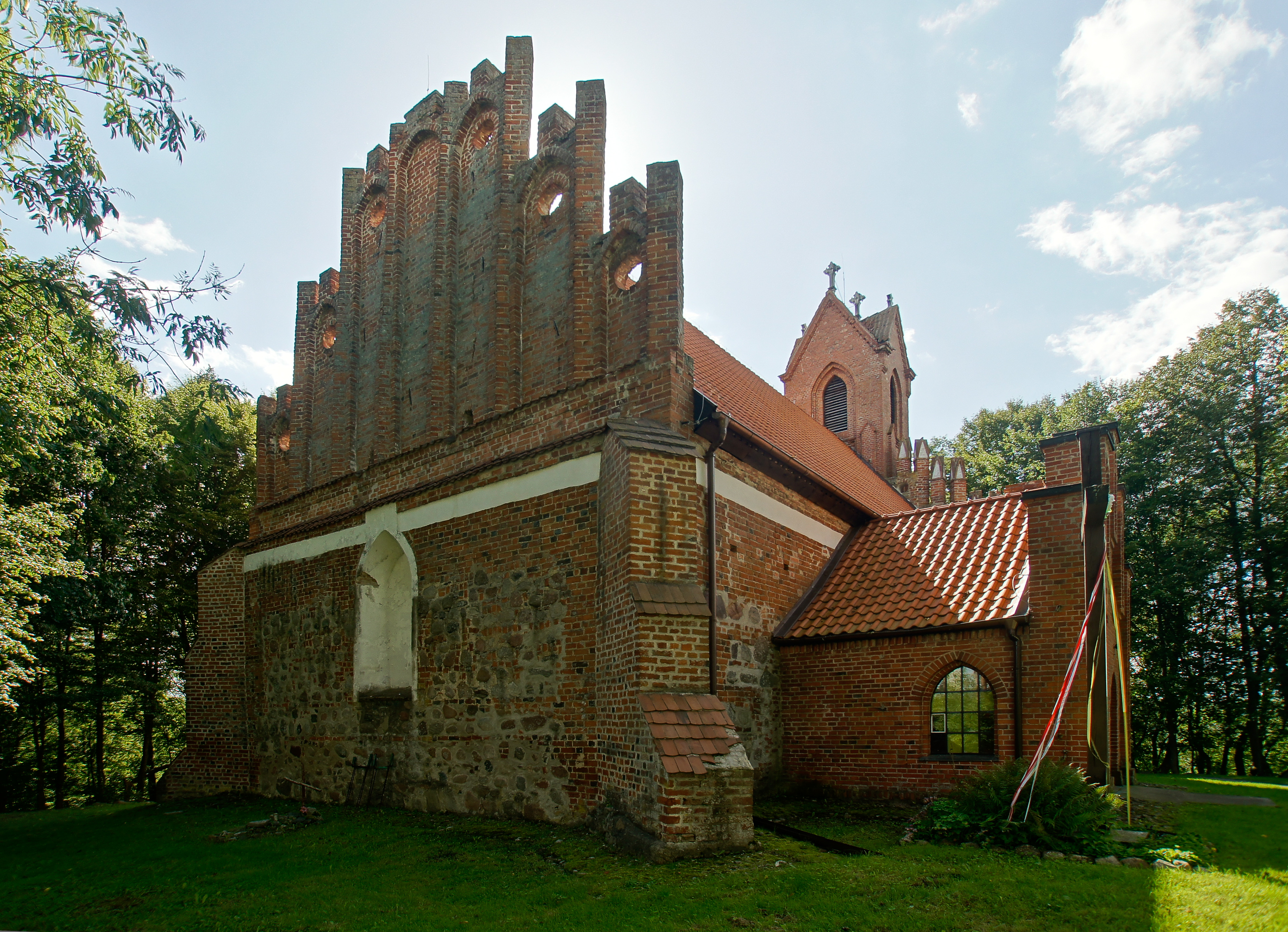
- Gothic Saint John church in Czerniki

- Location within Poland
- Coordinates: 54°5′N 21°26′E
- Country: Poland
- Voivodeship: Warmian-Masurian
- County: Kętrzyn
- Gmina: Kętrzyn

Population
  - Total: 259
- Time zone: UTC+1 (CET)
  - Summer (DST): UTC+2 (CEST)
- Vehicle registration: NKE

Czerniki [t͡ʂɛrˈniki] is a village in the administrative district of Gmina Kętrzyn, within Kętrzyn County, Warmian-Masurian Voivodeship, in northern Poland.

Historically, Polish-language services were held in the local church.
