= Biedaszki Małe =

- Village
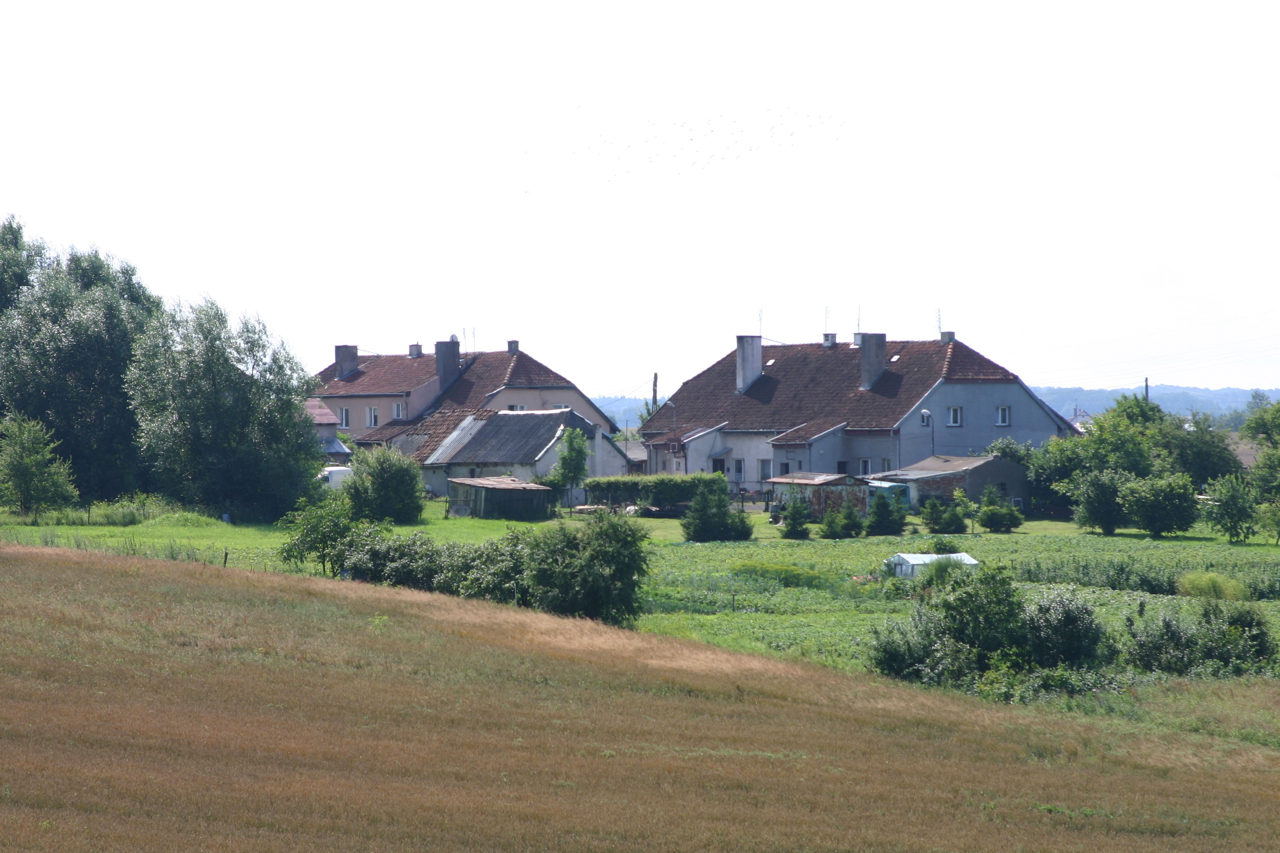

- Location within Poland
- Coordinates: 54°4′7″N 21°20′0″E
- Country: Poland
- Voivodeship: Warmian-Masurian
- County: Kętrzyn
- Gmina: Kętrzyn
- Population: 417

Biedaszki Małe [bjɛˈdaʂki ˈmawɛ] (German: Klein Neuhof) is a village in the administrative district of Gmina Kętrzyn, within Kętrzyn County, Warmian-Masurian Voivodeship, in northern Poland.
