= Wilkowo, Kętrzyn County =

Wilkowo
- Village
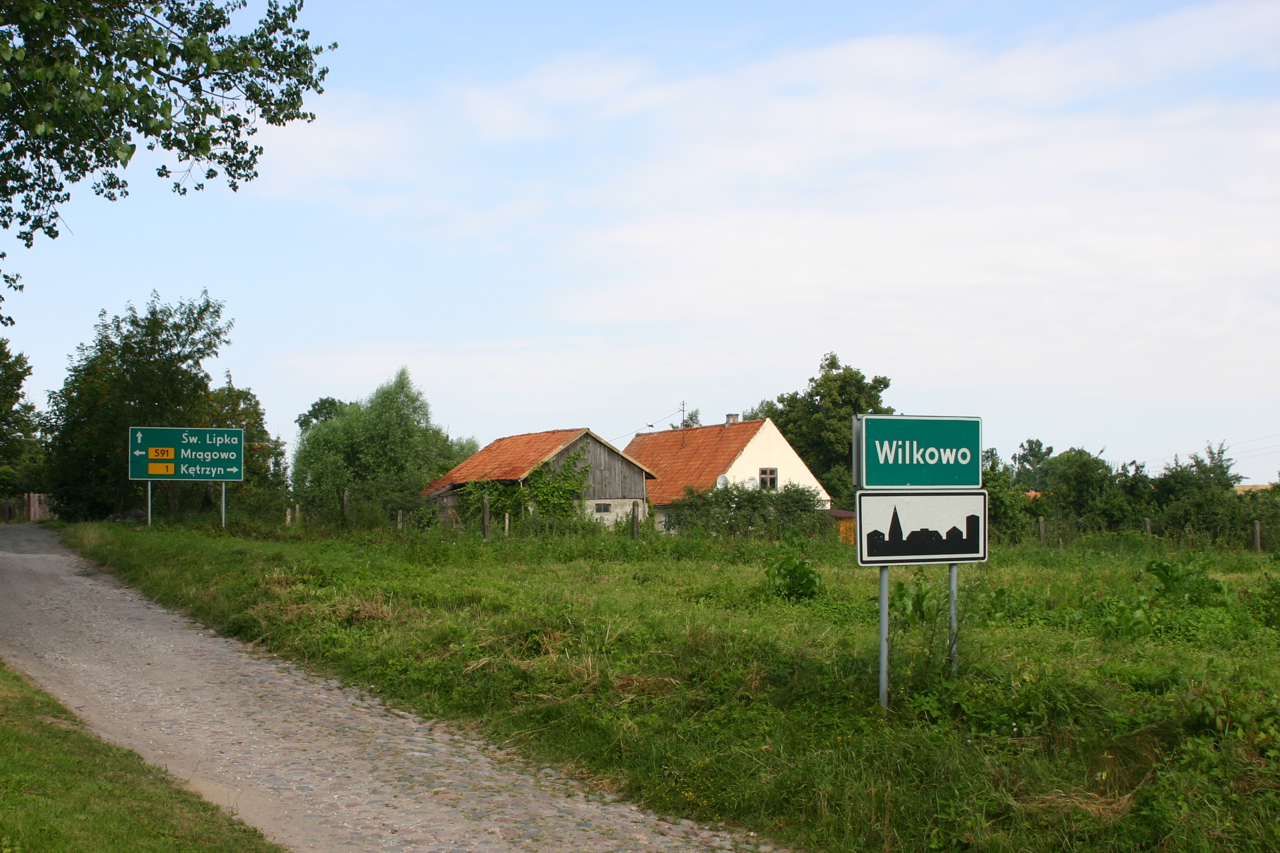

- Location within Poland
- Coordinates: 54°1′N 21°18′E
- Country: Poland
- Voivodeship: Warmian-Masurian
- County: Kętrzyn
- Gmina: Kętrzyn
- Population: 248

Wilkowo [vilˈkɔvɔ] (German: Wilkendorf) is a village in the administrative district of Gmina Kętrzyn, within Kętrzyn County, Warmian-Masurian Voivodeship, in northern Poland.
