= Pręgowo, Warmian-Masurian Voivodeship =

Pręgowo
- Village
- Location within Poland
- Coordinates: 54°1′24″N 21°20′36″E
- Country: Poland
- Voivodeship: Warmian-Masurian
- County: Kętrzyn
- Gmina: Kętrzyn
- Population: 150

Pręgowo [prɛnˈɡɔvɔ] is a village in the administrative district of Gmina Kętrzyn, within Kętrzyn County, Warmian-Masurian Voivodeship, in northern Poland.
