= Bałowo, Kętrzyn County =

Bałowo
- Village
- Location within Poland
- Coordinates: 54°0′10″N 21°29′56″E
- Country: Poland
- Voivodeship: Warmian-Masurian
- County: Kętrzyn
- Gmina: Kętrzyn

Bałowo [baˈwɔvɔ] (German: Ballau) is a village in the administrative district of Gmina Kętrzyn, within Kętrzyn County, Warmian-Masurian Voivodeship, in northern Poland.
