= Muławki-Dwór =

- Settlement
- Location within Poland
- Coordinates: 54°02′18″N 21°21′36″E
- Country: Poland
- Voivodeship: Warmian-Masurian
- County: Kętrzyn
- Gmina: Kętrzyn

Muławki-Dwór [muˈwafki ˈdvur] is a settlement in the administrative district of Gmina Kętrzyn, within Kętrzyn County, Warmian-Masurian Voivodeship, in northern Poland.
