= Ostry Róg =

- Village
- Location within Poland
- Coordinates: 54°08′13″N 21°20′33″E
- Country: Poland
- Voivodeship: Warmian-Masurian
- County: Kętrzyn
- Gmina: Kętrzyn

Ostry Róg [ˈɔstrɨ ˈruk] is a village in the administrative district of Gmina Kętrzyn, within Kętrzyn County, Warmian-Masurian Voivodeship, in northern Poland.
