= Wólka, Kętrzyn County =

Wólka
- Village
- Location within Poland
- Coordinates: 54°01′10″N 21°22′16″E
- Country: Poland
- Voivodeship: Warmian-Masurian
- County: Kętrzyn
- Gmina: Kętrzyn

Wólka [ˈvulka] (German: Wolka; 1938-45: Spittel) is a village in the administrative district of Gmina Kętrzyn, within Kętrzyn County, Warmian-Masurian Voivodeship, in northern Poland.
