= Muławki =

- Village
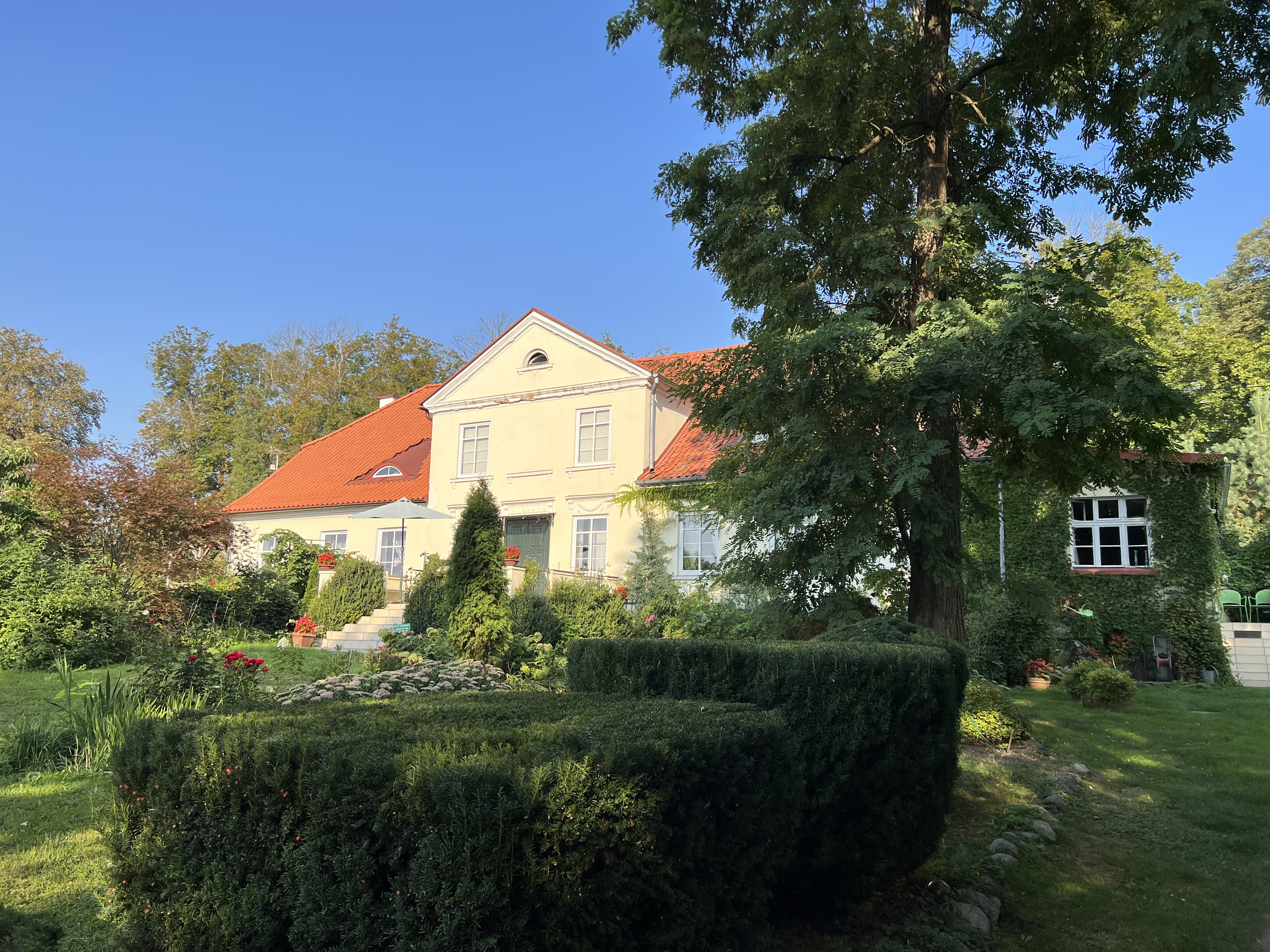

- Location within Poland
- Coordinates: 54°3′7″N 21°20′11″E
- Country: Poland
- Voivodeship: Warmian-Masurian
- County: Kętrzyn
- Gmina: Kętrzyn
- Population: 113

Muławki [muˈwafki] is a village in the administrative district of Gmina Kętrzyn, within Kętrzyn County, Warmian-Masurian Voivodeship, in northern Poland.
