= Langanki, Kętrzyn County =

Langanki
- Village
- Location within Poland
- Coordinates: 53°59′N 21°25′E
- Country: Poland
- Voivodeship: Warmian-Masurian
- County: Kętrzyn
- Gmina: Kętrzyn

Langanki [lanˈɡanki] is a village in the administrative district of Gmina Kętrzyn, within Kętrzyn County, Warmian-Masurian Voivodeship, in northern Poland.
