= Grabno, Warmian-Masurian Voivodeship =

Grabno
- Village
- Location within Poland
- Coordinates: 54°3′N 21°19′E
- Country: Poland
- Voivodeship: Warmian-Masurian
- County: Kętrzyn
- Gmina: Kętrzyn

Grabno [ˈɡrabnɔ] is a village in the administrative district of Gmina Kętrzyn, within Kętrzyn County, Warmian-Masurian Voivodeship, in northern Poland.
