= Stachowizna =

- Village
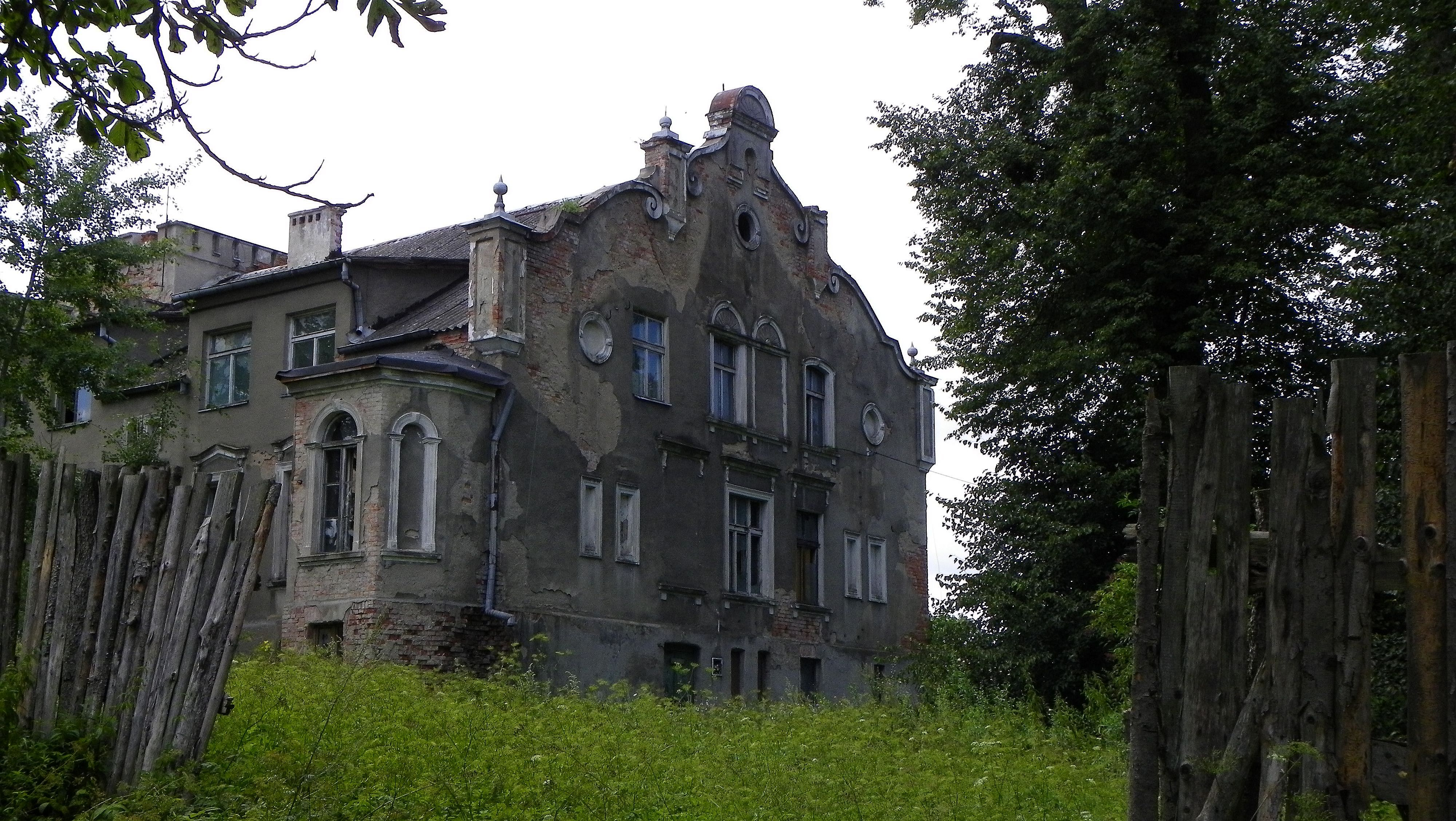

- Location within Poland
- Coordinates: 54°03′58″N 21°18′48″E
- Country: Poland
- Voivodeship: Warmian-Masurian
- County: Kętrzyn
- Gmina: Kętrzyn

Stachowizna [staxɔˈvizna] is a village in the administrative district of Gmina Kętrzyn, within Kętrzyn County, Warmian-Masurian Voivodeship, in northern Poland.
