= Mażany =

- Village
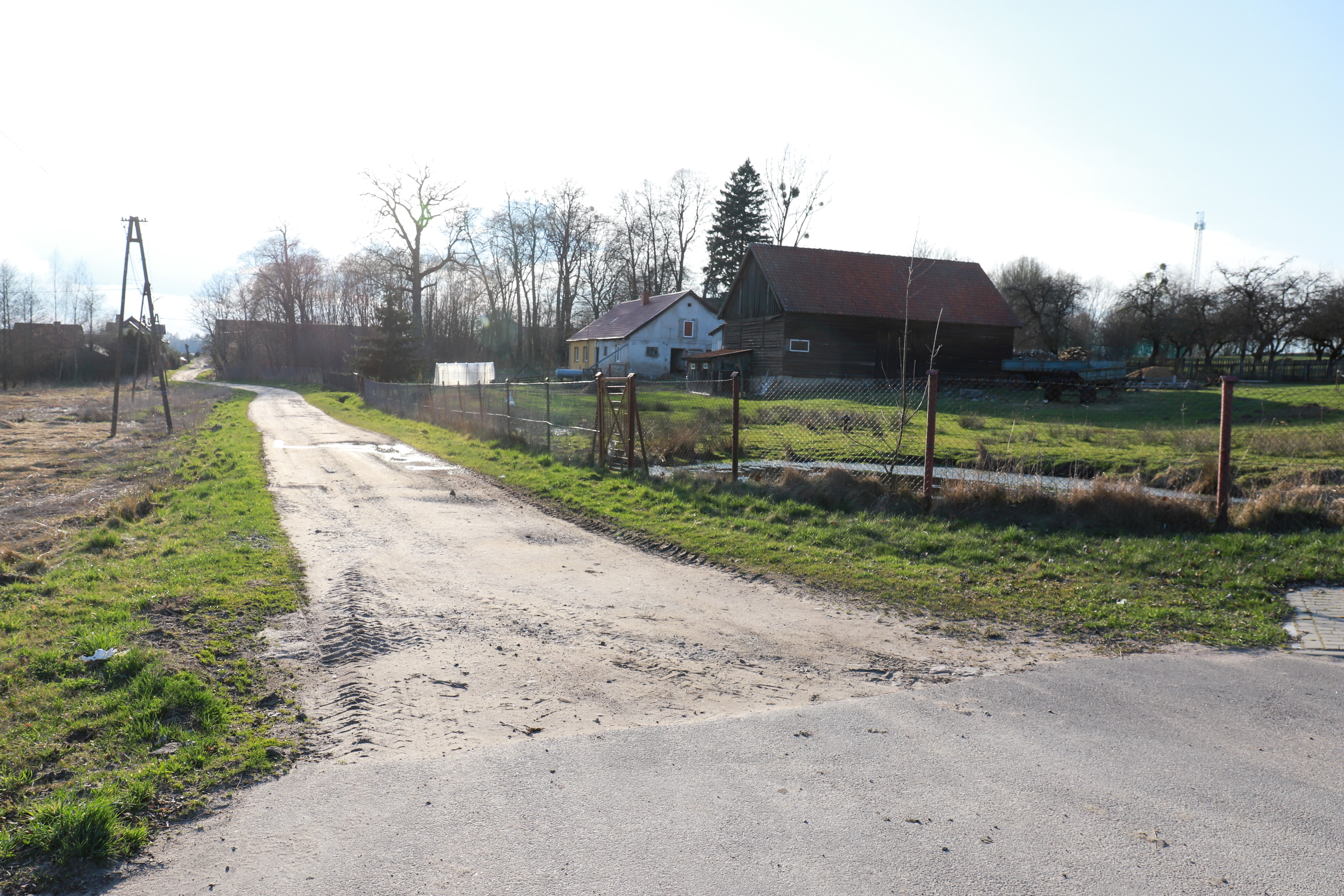

- Location within Poland
- Coordinates: 54°7′N 21°31′E
- Country: Poland
- Voivodeship: Warmian-Masurian
- County: Kętrzyn
- Gmina: Kętrzyn

Mażany [maˈʐanɨ] is a village in the administrative district of Gmina Kętrzyn, within Kętrzyn County, Warmian-Masurian Voivodeship, in northern Poland.
