= Jeżewo, Warmian-Masurian Voivodeship =

Jeżewo
- Village
- Location within Poland
- Coordinates: 54°6′N 21°17′E
- Country: Poland
- Voivodeship: Warmian-Masurian
- County: Kętrzyn
- Gmina: Kętrzyn
- Population: 130

Jeżewo [jɛˈʐɛvɔ] is a village in the administrative district of Gmina Kętrzyn, within Kętrzyn County, Warmian-Masurian Voivodeship, in northern Poland.
