= Biedaszki, Kętrzyn County =

Biedaszki
- Village
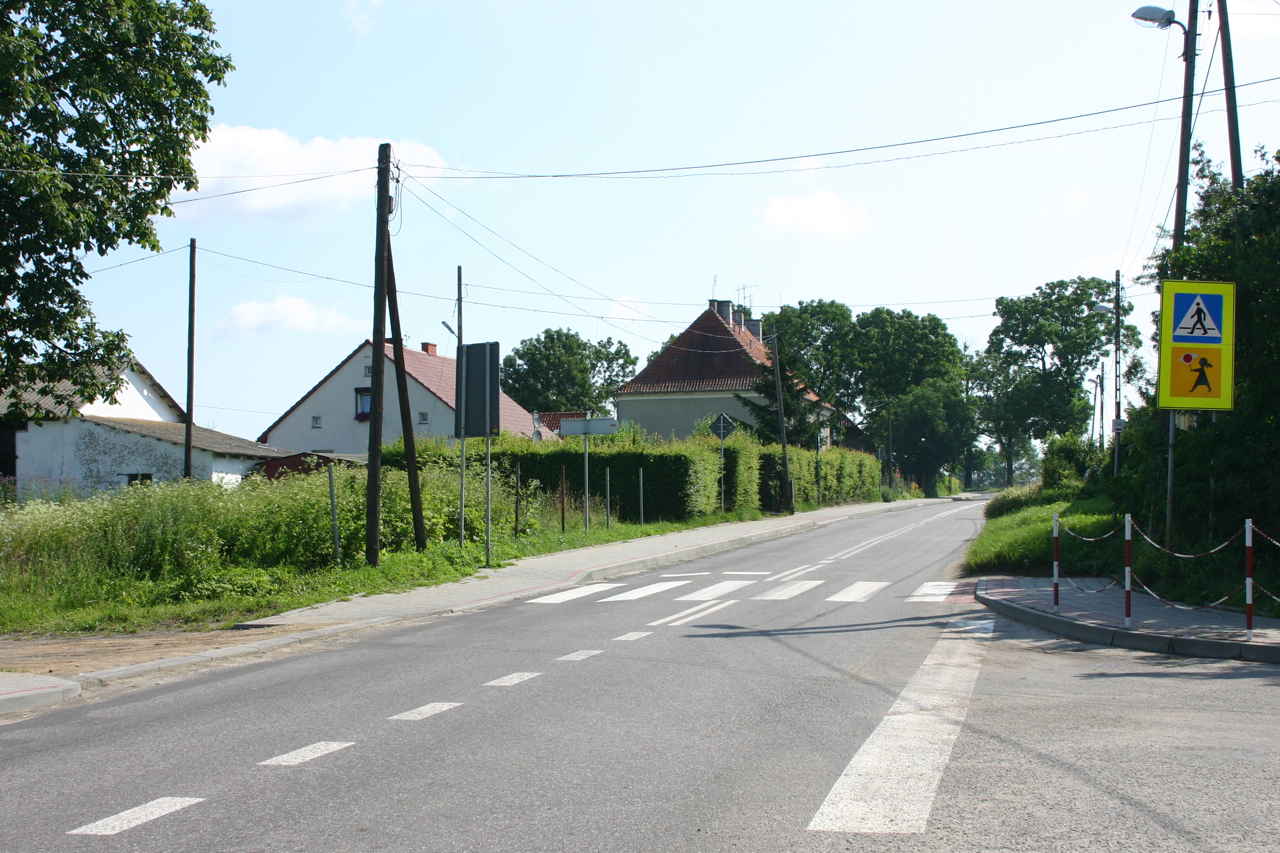

- Location within Poland
- Coordinates: 54°4′15″N 21°19′27″E
- Country: Poland
- Voivodeship: Warmian-Masurian
- County: Kętrzyn
- Gmina: Kętrzyn
- Elevation: 122 m (400 ft)
- Population: 120

Biedaszki [bjɛˈdaʂki] (German: Biedasken, later Groß Neuhof) is a village in the administrative district of Gmina Kętrzyn, within Kętrzyn County, Warmian-Masurian Voivodeship, in northern Poland.
