= Stara Różanka =

- Village
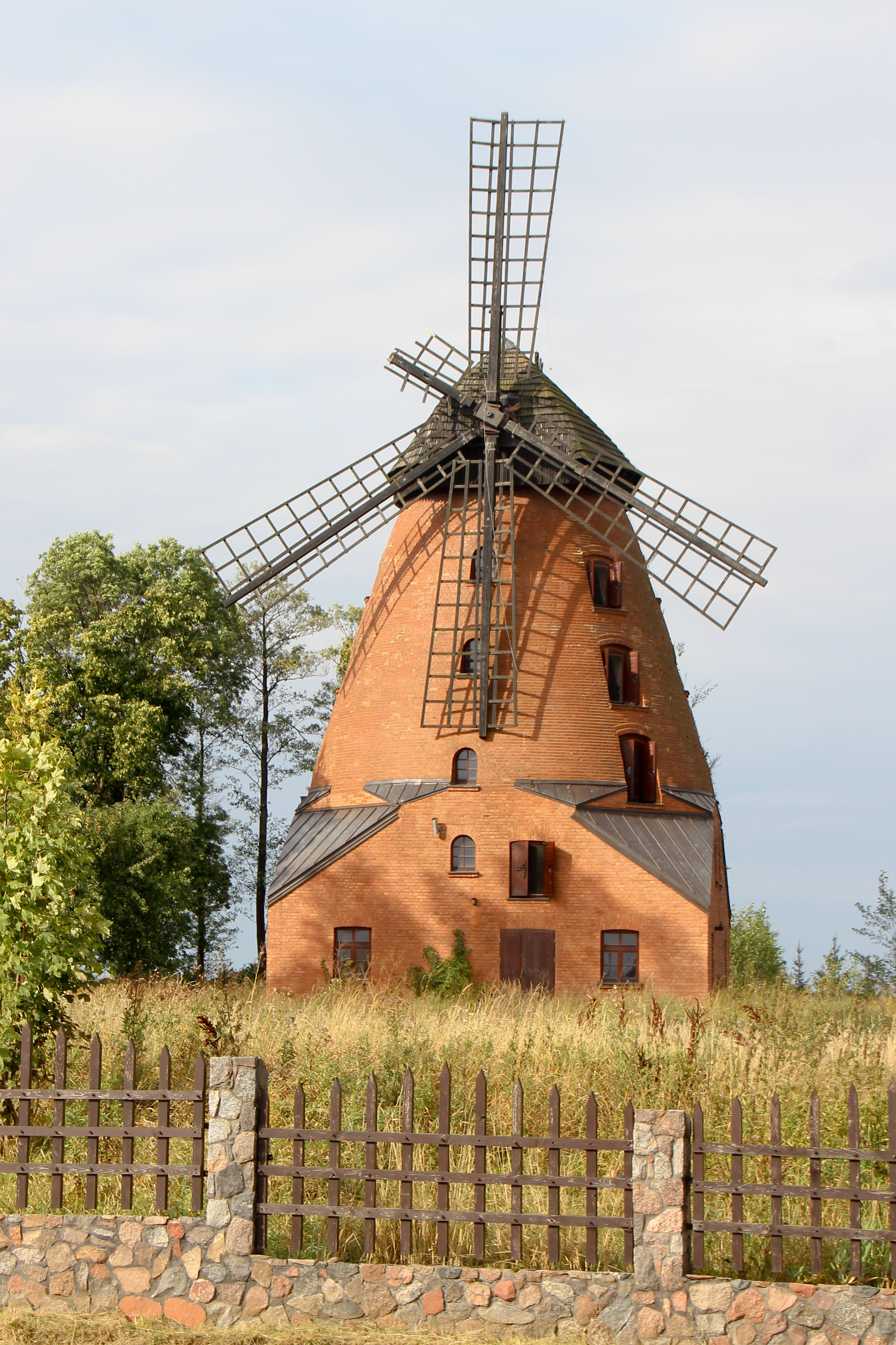
- Windmill in Stara Różank

- Location within Poland
- Coordinates: 54°6′40″N 21°24′11″E
- Country: Poland
- Voivodeship: Warmian-Masurian
- County: Kętrzyn
- Gmina: Kętrzyn
- Population: 191

Stara Różanka (Polish pronunciation: [ˈstara ruˈʐaŋka]) is a village in the administrative district of Gmina Kętrzyn, within Kętrzyn County, Warmian-Masurian Voivodeship, in northern Poland.
