= Sykstyny =

- Village
- Location within Poland
- Coordinates: 53°59′28″N 21°28′55″E
- Country: Poland
- Voivodeship: Warmian-Masurian
- County: Kętrzyn
- Gmina: Kętrzyn
- Population: 20

Sykstyny [sɨksˈtɨnɨ] is a village in the administrative district of Gmina Kętrzyn, within Kętrzyn County, Warmian-Masurian Voivodeship, in northern Poland.
