= Kwiedzina =

- Village
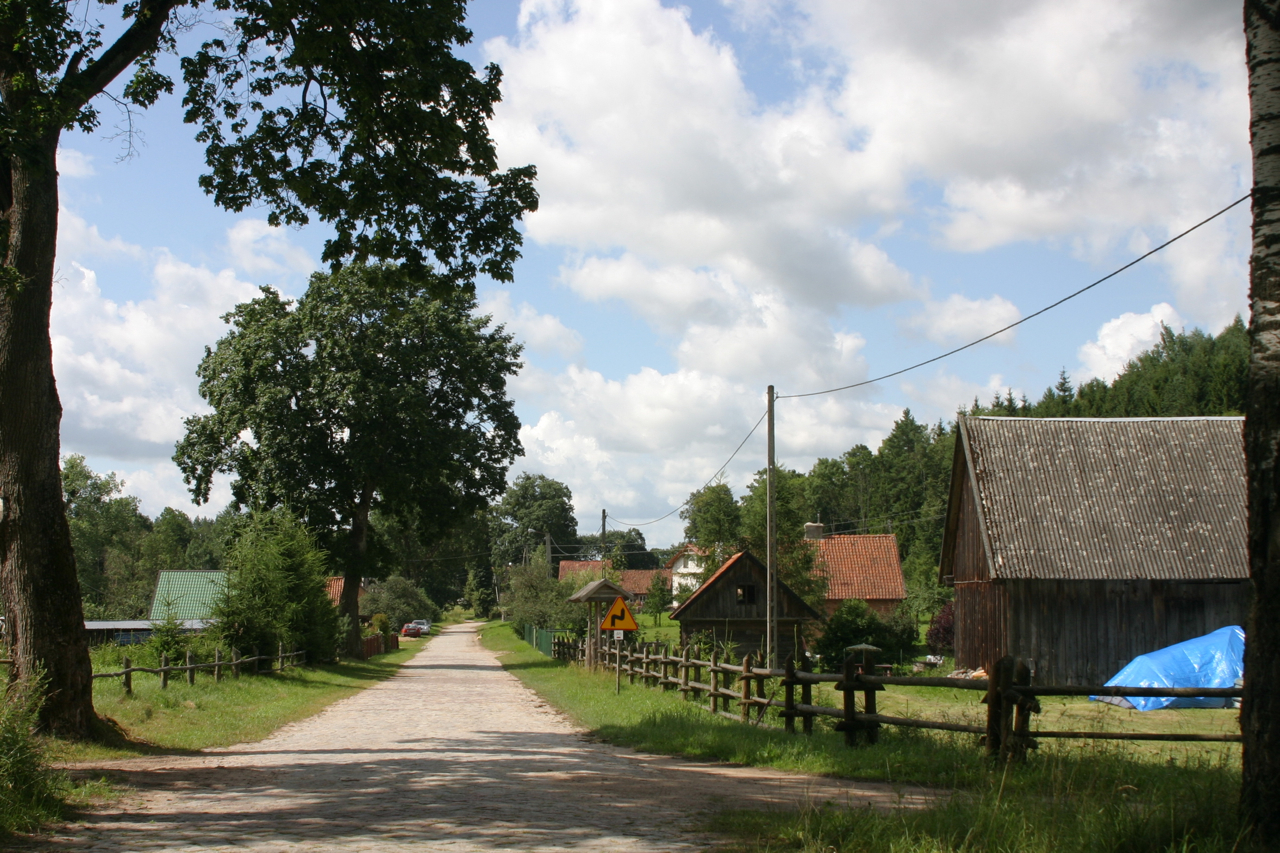

- Location within Poland
- Coordinates: 54°2′N 21°27′E
- Country: Poland
- Voivodeship: Warmian-Masurian
- County: Kętrzyn
- Gmina: Kętrzyn
- Population: 50

Kwiedzina [kfjɛˈd͡ʑina] is a village in the administrative district of Gmina Kętrzyn, within Kętrzyn County, Warmian-Masurian Voivodeship, in northern Poland.
