= Ugiertowo =

- Village
- Location within Poland
- Coordinates: 53°59′24″N 21°29′56″E
- Country: Poland
- Voivodeship: Warmian-Masurian
- County: Kętrzyn
- Gmina: Kętrzyn

Ugiertowo [uɡʲɛrˈtɔvɔ] is a village in the administrative district of Gmina Kętrzyn, within Kętrzyn County, Warmian-Masurian Voivodeship, in Northern Poland.
