= Banaszki =

- Village
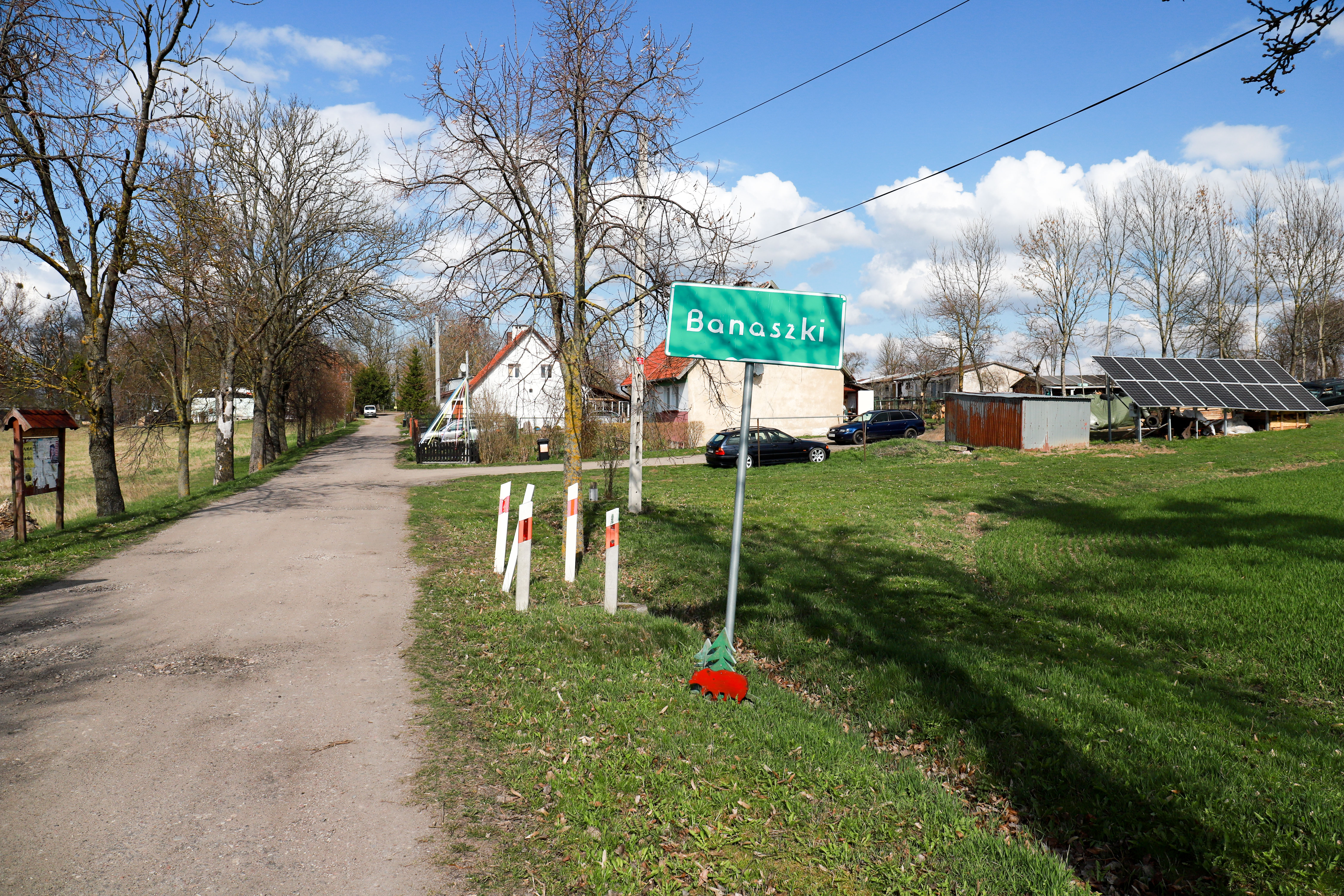

- Location within Poland
- Coordinates: 54°7′10″N 21°17′43″E
- Country: Poland
- Voivodeship: Warmian-Masurian
- County: Kętrzyn
- Gmina: Kętrzyn
- Population: 40

Banaszki [baˈnaʂki] (German: Gut Banaskeim or Bannaskeim) is a village in the administrative district of Gmina Kętrzyn, within Kętrzyn County, Warmian-Masurian Voivodeship, in northern Poland.
