= Windykajmy =

- Village
- Location within Poland
- Coordinates: 54°02′39″N 21°22′12″E
- Country: Poland
- Voivodeship: Warmian-Masurian
- County: Kętrzyn
- Gmina: Kętrzyn

Windykajmy [vindɨˈkai̯mɨ] (German: Windtkeim) is a village in the administrative district of Gmina Kętrzyn, within Kętrzyn County, Warmian-Masurian Voivodeship, in northern Poland.
