= Godzikowo =

- Village
- Location within Poland
- Coordinates: 54°00′57″N 21°25′55″E
- Country: Poland
- Voivodeship: Warmian-Masurian
- County: Kętrzyn
- Gmina: Kętrzyn

Godzikowo [ɡɔd͡ʑiˈkɔvɔ] is a village in the administrative district of Gmina Kętrzyn, within Kętrzyn County, Warmian-Masurian Voivodeship, in northern Poland.
