= Gryzławki =

- Village
- Location within Poland
- Coordinates: 54°7′25″N 21°29′1″E
- Country: Poland
- Voivodeship: Warmian-Masurian
- County: Kętrzyn
- Gmina: Kętrzyn

Gryzławki [ɡrɨˈzwafki] is a village in the administrative district of Gmina Kętrzyn, within Kętrzyn County, Warmian-Masurian Voivodeship, in northern Poland.

There are no buildings in the village.
