= Cegielnia, Warmian-Masurian Voivodeship =

Cegielnia
- Settlement
- Location within Poland
- Coordinates: 54°04′09″N 21°25′26″E
- Country: Poland
- Voivodeship: Warmian-Masurian
- County: Kętrzyn
- Gmina: Kętrzyn

Cegielnia [t͡sɛˈɡʲɛlɲa] (German: Louisenthal) is a settlement in the administrative district of Gmina Kętrzyn, within Kętrzyn County, Warmian-Masurian Voivodeship, in northern Poland.
