= Porębek =

- Village
- Location within Poland
- Coordinates: 54°5′7″N 21°17′57″E
- Country: Poland
- Voivodeship: Warmian-Masurian
- County: Kętrzyn
- Gmina: Kętrzyn

Porębek [pɔˈrɛmbɛk] is a village in the administrative district of Gmina Kętrzyn, within Kętrzyn County, Warmian-Masurian Voivodeship, in northern Poland.
