= Góry, Kętrzyn County =

Góry
- Settlement
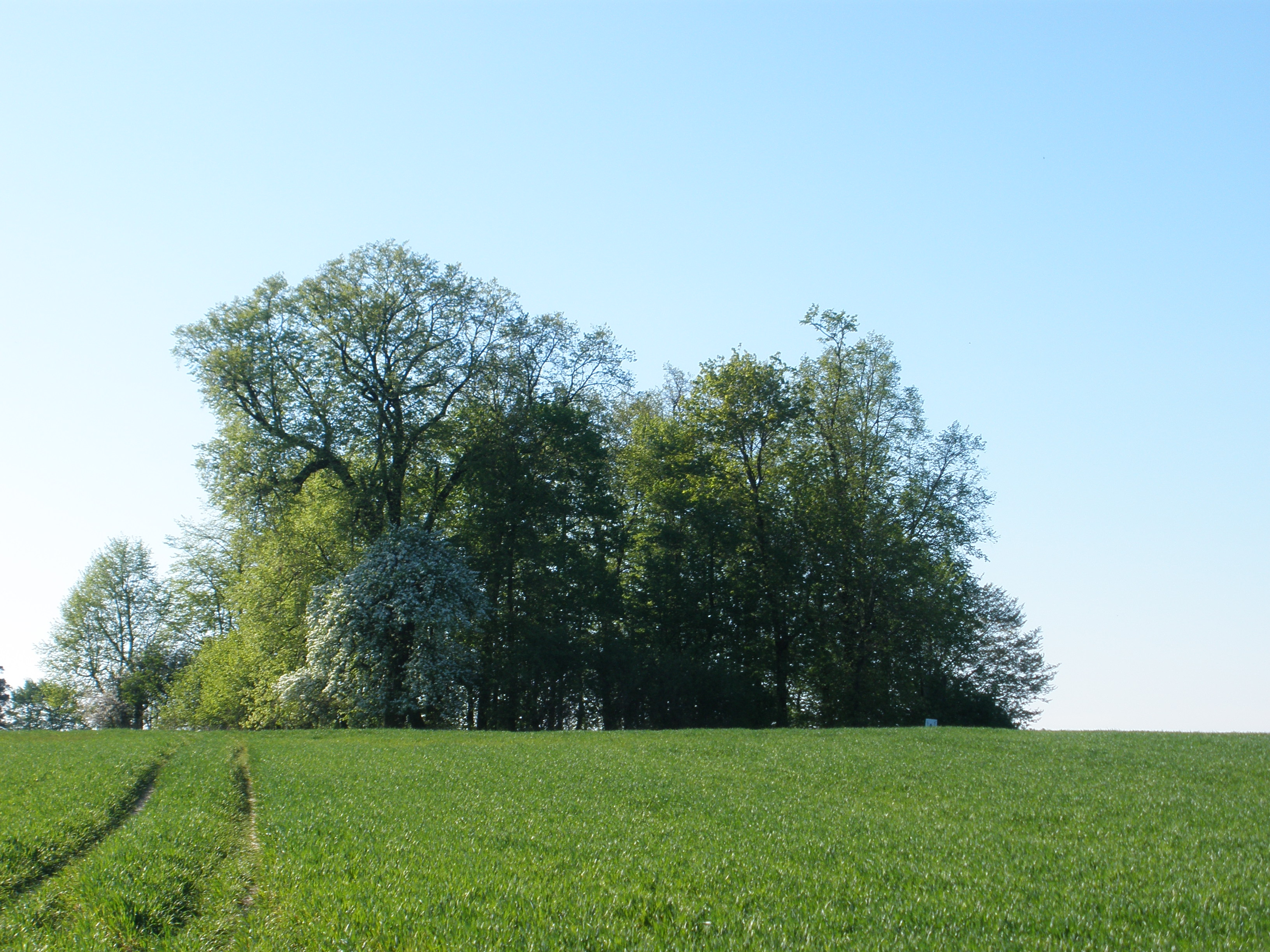

- Location within Poland
- Coordinates: 54°5′30″N 21°26′5″E
- Country: Poland
- Voivodeship: Warmian-Masurian
- County: Kętrzyn
- Gmina: Kętrzyn
- Population: 20

Góry [ˈɡurɨ] is a settlement in the administrative district of Gmina Kętrzyn, within Kętrzyn County, Warmian-Masurian Voivodeship, in northern Poland.
