= Henrykowo, Kętrzyn County =

Henrykowo
- Settlement
- Location within Poland
- Coordinates: 53°59′03″N 21°16′55″E
- Country: Poland
- Voivodeship: Warmian-Masurian
- County: Kętrzyn
- Gmina: Kętrzyn
- Population (approx.): 16

Henrykowo [xɛnrɨˈkɔvɔ] is a settlement in the administrative district of Gmina Kętrzyn, within Kętrzyn County, Warmian-Masurian Voivodeship, in northern Poland.
