= Nowy Młyn, Kętrzyn County =

Nowy Młyn
- Village
- Location within Poland
- Coordinates: 54°3′55″N 21°19′15″E
- Country: Poland
- Voivodeship: Warmian-Masurian
- County: Kętrzyn
- Gmina: Kętrzyn
- Population: 17

Nowy Młyn [ˈnɔvɨ ˈmwɨn] is a village in the administrative district of Gmina Kętrzyn, within Kętrzyn County, Warmian-Masurian Voivodeship, in northern Poland.
