= Osewo =

- Settlement
- Location within Poland
- Coordinates: 54°3′4″N 21°31′29″E
- Country: Poland
- Voivodeship: Warmian-Masurian
- County: Kętrzyn
- Gmina: Kętrzyn

Osewo [ɔˈsɛvɔ] is a settlement in the administrative district of Gmina Kętrzyn, within Kętrzyn County, Warmian-Masurian Voivodeship, in northern Poland.
