= Bałtrucie =

- Village
- Location within Poland
- Coordinates: 54°6′16″N 21°22′17″E
- Country: Poland
- Voivodeship: Warmian-Masurian
- County: Kętrzyn
- Gmina: Kętrzyn

Bałtrucie [bau̯ˈtrut͡ɕɛ] (German: Rastenburgswalde) is a village in the administrative district of Gmina Kętrzyn, within Kętrzyn County, Warmian-Masurian Voivodeship, in northern Poland.
