= Stadniki, Warmian-Masurian Voivodeship =

Stadniki
- Village
- Location within Poland
- Coordinates: 54°00′45″N 21°18′38″E
- Country: Poland
- Voivodeship: Warmian-Masurian
- County: Kętrzyn
- Gmina: Kętrzyn

Stadniki [stadˈniki] is a village in the administrative district of Gmina Kętrzyn, within Kętrzyn County, Warmian-Masurian Voivodeship, in northern Poland.
