= Owczarki, Warmian-Masurian Voivodeship =

Owczarki
- Village
- Location within Poland
- Coordinates: 54°4′51″N 21°16′7″E
- Country: Poland
- Voivodeship: Warmian-Masurian
- County: Kętrzyn
- Gmina: Kętrzyn
- Population: 10

Owczarki [ɔfˈt͡ʂarki] is a village in the administrative district of Gmina Kętrzyn, within Kętrzyn County, Warmian-Masurian Voivodeship, in northern Poland.
