= Kotkowo, Kętrzyn County =

Kotkowo
- Village
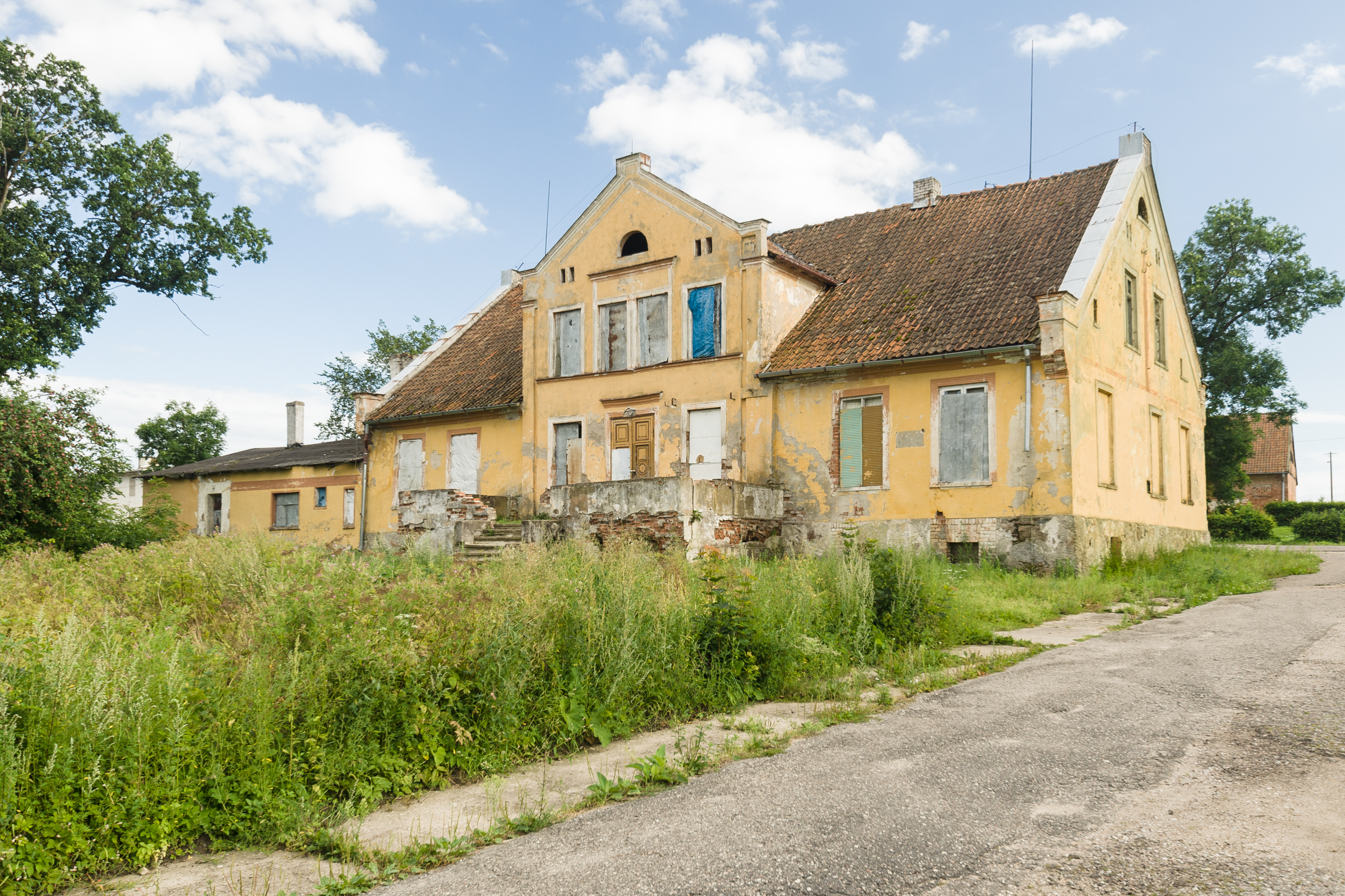
- Cultural heritage building in Kotkowo

- Location within Poland
- Coordinates: 54°05′33″N 21°16′59″E
- Country: Poland
- Voivodeship: Warmian-Masurian
- County: Kętrzyn
- Gmina: Kętrzyn

Kotkowo [kɔtˈkɔvɔ] is a village in the administrative district of Gmina Kętrzyn, within Kętrzyn County, Warmian-Masurian Voivodeship, in northern Poland.
