= Salpik =

- Village
- Location within Poland
- Coordinates: 53°59′46″N 21°30′24″E
- Country: Poland
- Voivodeship: Warmian-Masurian
- County: Kętrzyn
- Gmina: Kętrzyn

Salpik [ˈsalpik] is a village in the administrative district of Gmina Kętrzyn, within Kętrzyn County, Warmian-Masurian Voivodeship, in northern Poland.
