= Suchodoły, Gmina Kętrzyn =

Suchodoły
- Settlement
- Location within Poland
- Coordinates: 54°14′08″N 21°31′48″E
- Country: Poland
- Voivodeship: Warmian-Masurian
- County: Kętrzyn
- Gmina: Kętrzyn

Suchodoły [suxɔˈdɔwɨ] is a settlement in the administrative district of Gmina Kętrzyn, within Kętrzyn County, Warmian-Masurian Voivodeship, in northern Poland.
