= Koczarki =

- Village
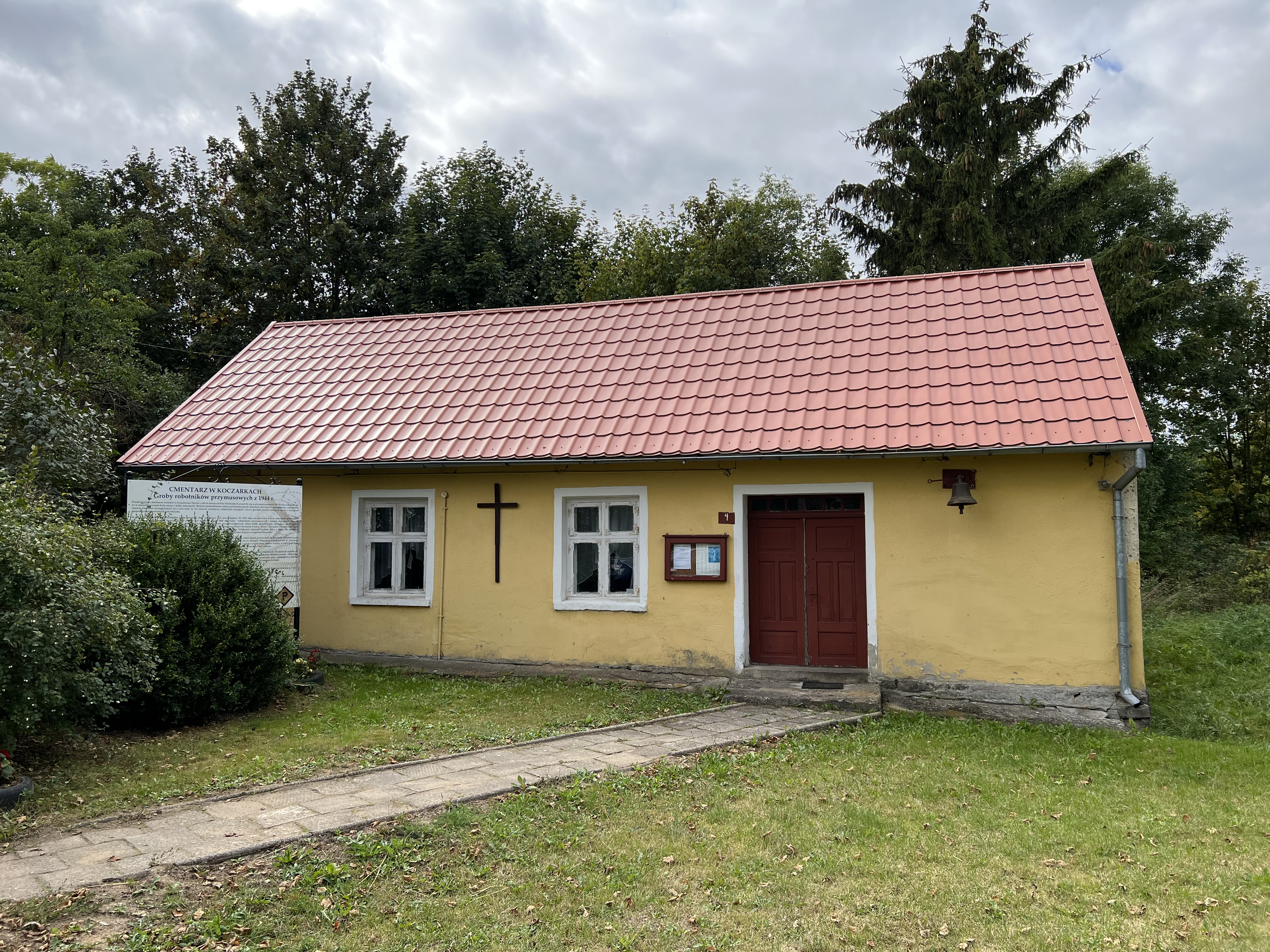

- Location within Poland
- Coordinates: 53°59′N 21°28′E
- Country: Poland
- Voivodeship: Warmian-Masurian
- County: Kętrzyn
- Gmina: Kętrzyn
- Population: 271

Koczarki [kɔˈt͡ʂarki] is a village in the administrative district of Gmina Kętrzyn, within Kętrzyn County, Warmian-Masurian Voivodeship, in northern Poland.
