= Nowa Wieś Mała, Kętrzyn County =

Nowa Wieś Mała
- Village
- Location within Poland
- Coordinates: 54°02′53″N 21°22′46″E
- Country: Poland
- Voivodeship: Warmian-Masurian
- County: Kętrzyn
- Gmina: Kętrzyn

Nowa Wieś Mała [ˈnɔva ˈvjɛɕ ˈmawa] is a village in the administrative district of Gmina Kętrzyn, within Kętrzyn County, Warmian-Masurian Voivodeship, in northern Poland.
