= Filipówka, Warmian-Masurian Voivodeship =

Filipówka
- Village
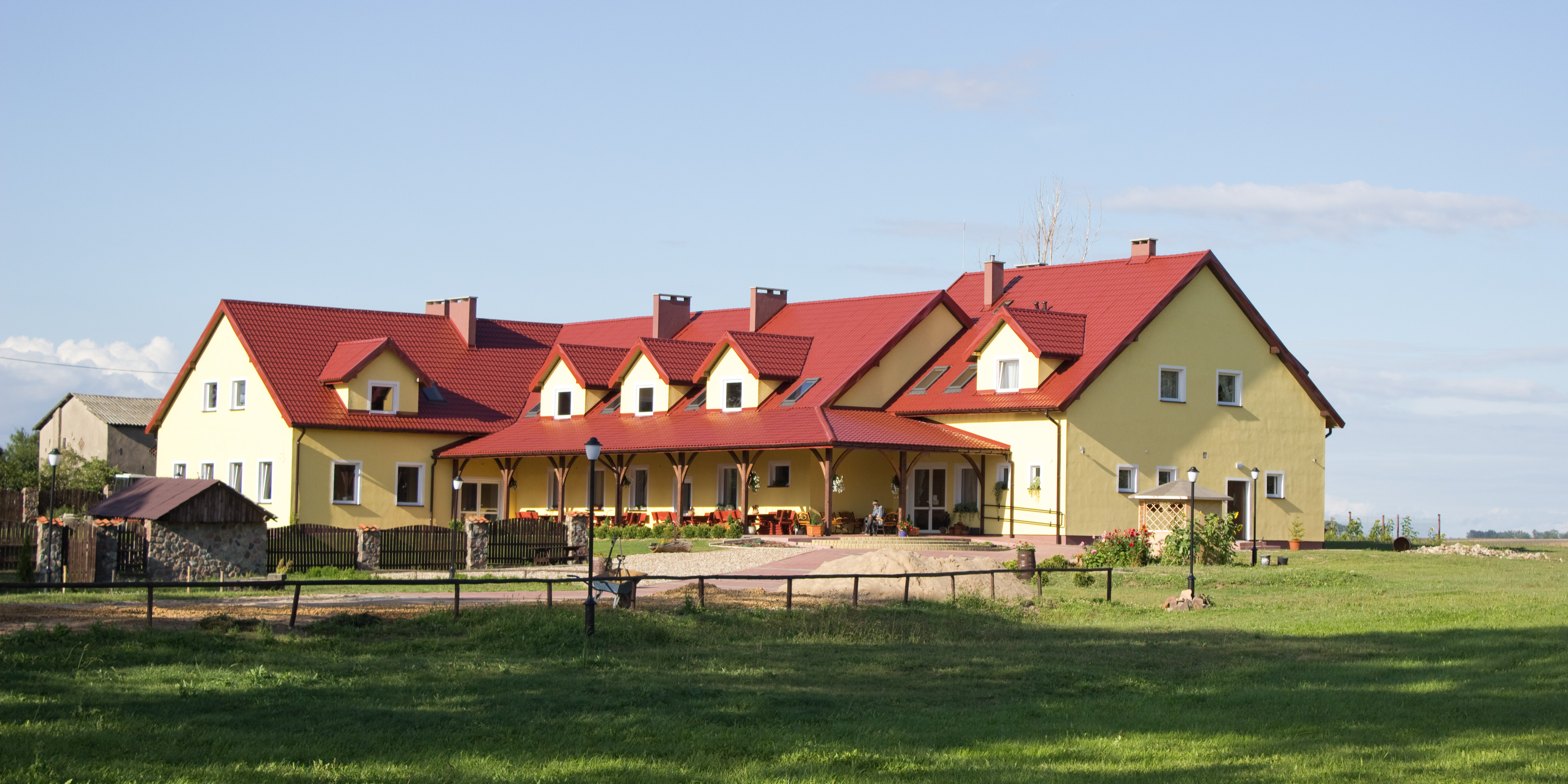
- Manor house in Filipówka

- Location within Poland
- Coordinates: 54°4′37″N 21°18′2″E
- Country: Poland
- Voivodeship: Warmian-Masurian
- County: Kętrzyn
- Gmina: Kętrzyn

Filipówka [filiˈpufka] is a village in the administrative district of Gmina Kętrzyn, within Kętrzyn County, Warmian-Masurian Voivodeship, in northern Poland.
