= Gnatowo-Kolonia =

- Settlement
- Location within Poland
- Coordinates: 54°5′0″N 21°20′45″E
- Country: Poland
- Voivodeship: Warmian-Masurian
- County: Kętrzyn
- Gmina: Kętrzyn

Gnatowo-Kolonia [ɡnaˈtɔvɔ kɔˈlɔɲa] is a settlement in the administrative district of Gmina Kętrzyn, within Kętrzyn County, Warmian-Masurian Voivodeship, in northern Poland.
