= Wymiarki, Warmian-Masurian Voivodeship =

Wymiarki
- Village
- Location within Poland
- Coordinates: 51°54′N 19°09′E
- Country: Poland
- Voivodeship: Warmian-Masurian
- County: Kętrzyn
- Gmina: Kętrzyn

Wymiarki [vɨˈmjarki] (German: Charlottenberg) is a village in the administrative district of Gmina Kętrzyn, within Kętrzyn County, Warmian-Masurian Voivodeship, in northern Poland.
