= Działki, Warmian-Masurian Voivodeship =

Działki
- Settlement
- Location within Poland
- Coordinates: 54°6′15″N 21°21′39″E
- Country: Poland
- Voivodeship: Warmian-Masurian
- County: Kętrzyn
- Gmina: Kętrzyn

Działki [ˈd͡ʑau̯ki] is a settlement in the administrative district of Gmina Kętrzyn, within Kętrzyn County, Warmian-Masurian Voivodeship, in northern Poland.
