= Wajsznory =

- Village
- Location within Poland
- Coordinates: 54°3′N 21°24′E
- Country: Poland
- Voivodeship: Warmian-Masurian
- County: Kętrzyn
- Gmina: Kętrzyn

Wajsznory [vai̯ʂˈnɔrɨ] (German: Weischnuren) is a village in the administrative district of Gmina Kętrzyn, within Kętrzyn County, Warmian-Masurian Voivodeship, in northern Poland.
