= Gałwuny =

- Village
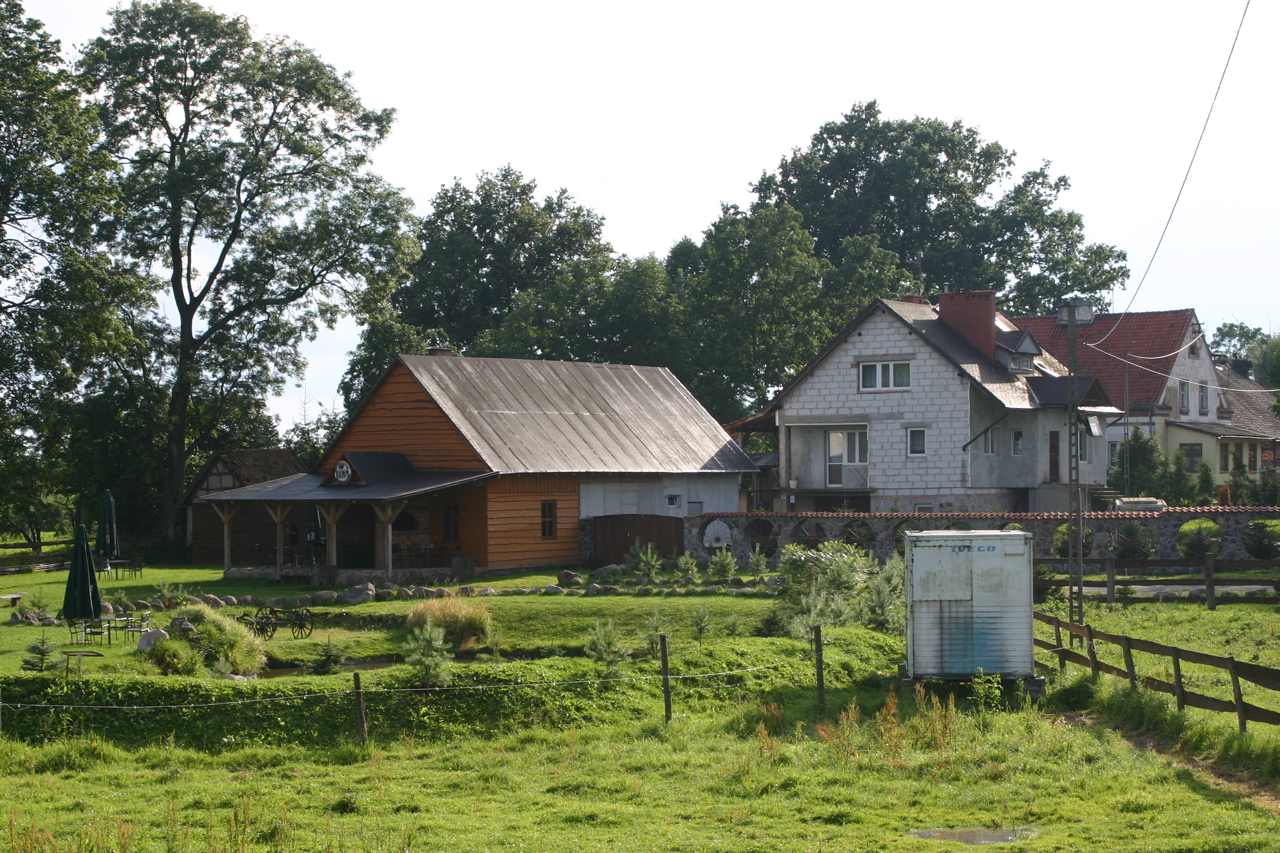

- Location within Poland
- Coordinates: 54°6′N 21°19′E
- Country: Poland
- Voivodeship: Warmian-Masurian
- County: Kętrzyn
- Gmina: Kętrzyn

Gałwuny ([ɡau̯ˈvunɨ] is a village in the administrative district of Gmina Kętrzyn, within Kętrzyn County, Warmian-Masurian Voivodeship, in northern Poland.
