= Nowa Różanka, Gmina Kętrzyn =

Nowa Różanka
- Village

- Location within Poland
- Coordinates: 54°7′5″N 21°26′26″E
- Country: Poland
- Voivodeship: Warmian-Masurian
- County: Kętrzyn
- Gmina: Kętrzyn

Nowa Różanka (Polish pronunciation: [ˈnɔva ruˈʐaŋka]) is a village in the administrative district of Gmina Kętrzyn, within Kętrzyn County, Warmian-Masurian Voivodeship, in northern Poland.
