= Owczarnia, Kętrzyn County =

Owczarnia
- Village
- Location within Poland
- Coordinates: 54°1′55″N 21°28′7″E
- Country: Poland
- Voivodeship: Warmian-Masurian
- County: Kętrzyn
- Gmina: Kętrzyn
- Population: 17

Owczarnia [ɔfˈt͡ʂarɲa] is a village in the administrative district of Gmina Kętrzyn, within Kętrzyn County, Warmian-Masurian Voivodeship, in northern Poland.
