= Przeczniak =

- Settlement
- Location within Poland
- Coordinates: 53°59′49″N 21°27′55″E
- Country: Poland
- Voivodeship: Warmian-Masurian
- County: Kętrzyn
- Gmina: Kętrzyn

Przeczniak [ˈpʂɛt͡ʂɲak] is a settlement in the administrative district of Gmina Kętrzyn, within Kętrzyn County, Warmian-Masurian Voivodeship, in northern Poland.
