= Jankowo, Kętrzyn County =

Jankowo
- Village
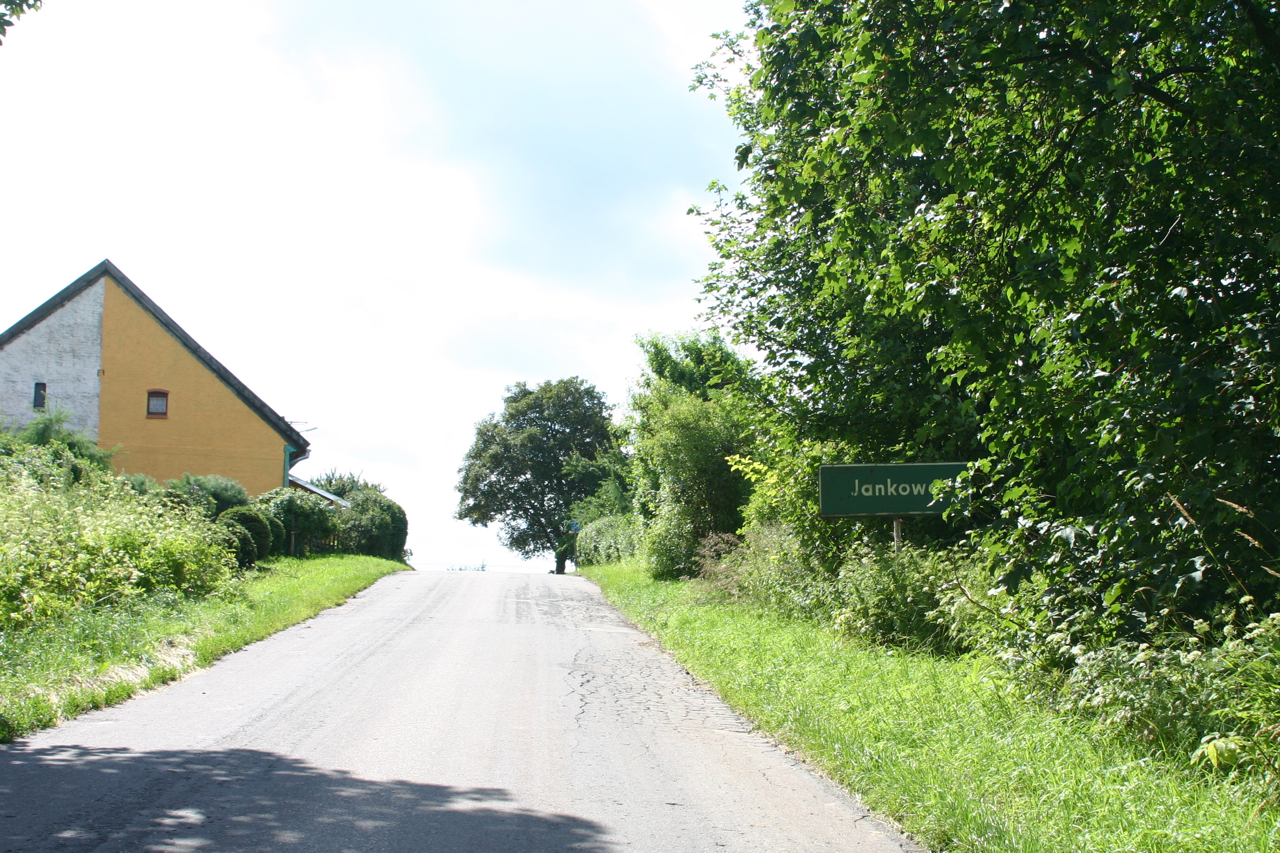

- Location within Poland
- Coordinates: 54°5′20″N 21°31′4″E
- Country: Poland
- Voivodeship: Warmian-Masurian
- County: Kętrzyn
- Gmina: Kętrzyn
- Population: 50

Jankowo [janˈkɔvɔ] is a village in the administrative district of Gmina Kętrzyn, within Kętrzyn County, Warmian-Masurian Voivodeship, in northern Poland.
