= Gromki, Kętrzyn County =

Gromki
- Village
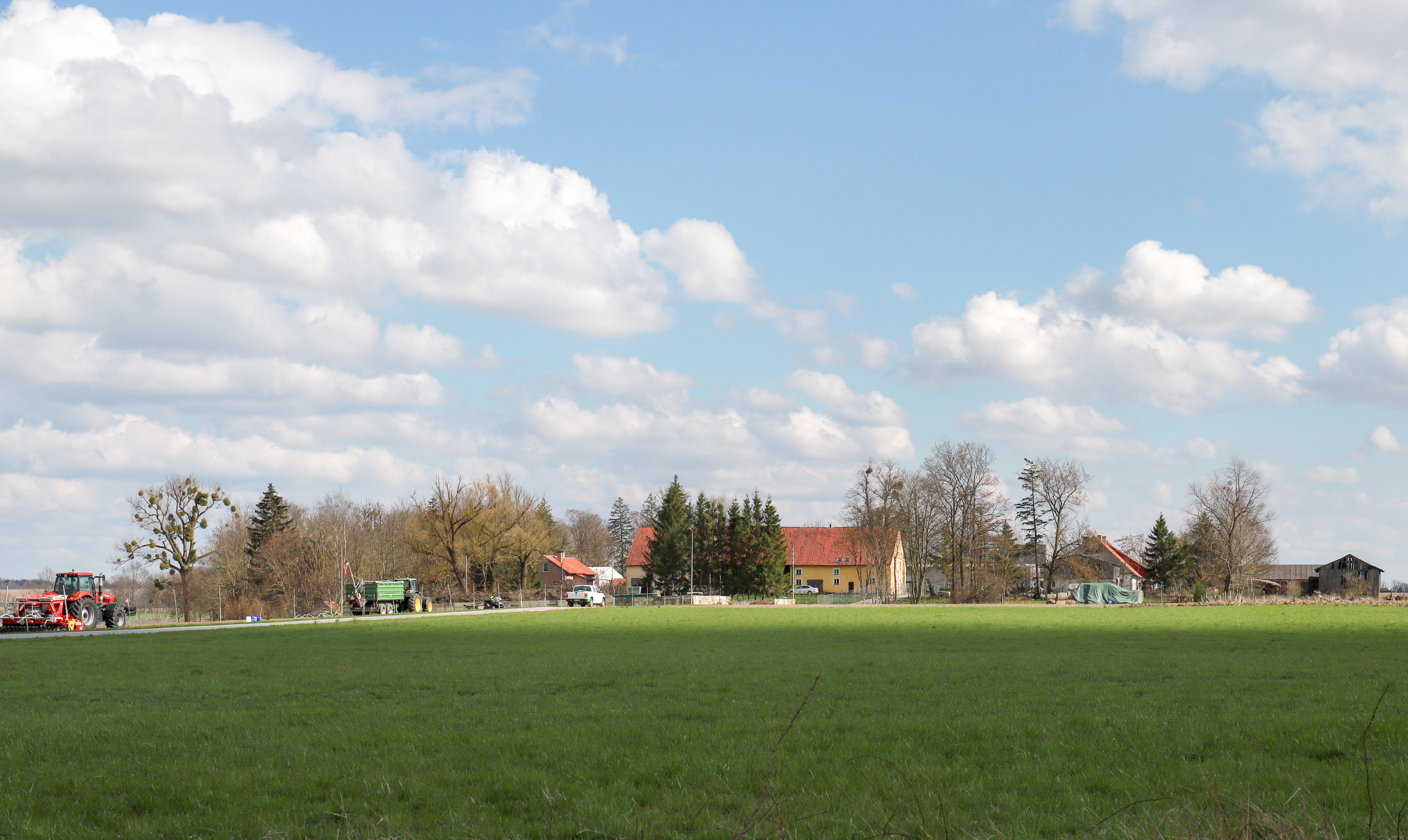

- Location within Poland
- Coordinates: 54°7′12″N 21°18′28″E
- Country: Poland
- Voivodeship: Warmian-Masurian
- County: Kętrzyn
- Gmina: Kętrzyn
- Population: 20

Gromki [ˈɡrɔmki] is a village in the administrative district of Gmina Kętrzyn, within Kętrzyn County, Warmian-Masurian Voivodeship, in northern Poland.
