= Marszewo, Warmian-Masurian Voivodeship =

Marszewo
- Village
- Location within Poland
- Coordinates: 54°05′12″N 21°19′51″E
- Country: Poland
- Voivodeship: Warmian-Masurian
- County: Kętrzyn
- Gmina: Kętrzyn

Marszewo [marˈʂɛvɔ] is a village in the administrative district of Gmina Kętrzyn, within Kętrzyn County, Warmian-Masurian Voivodeship, in northern Poland.
