= Kruszewiec, Warmian-Masurian Voivodeship =

Kruszewiec
- Village
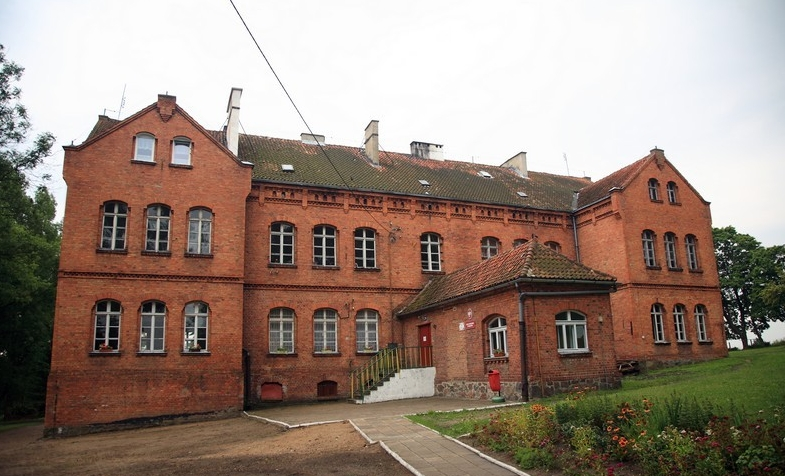

- Location within Poland
- Coordinates: 54°4′29″N 21°24′31″E
- Country: Poland
- Voivodeship: Warmian-Masurian
- County: Kętrzyn
- Gmina: Kętrzyn
- Population: 195

Kruszewiec [kruˈʂɛvjɛt͡s] is a village in the administrative district of Gmina Kętrzyn, within Kętrzyn County, Warmian-Masurian Voivodeship, in northern Poland.
