= Dąbrowa, Kętrzyn County =

Dąbrowa
- Settlement
- Location within Poland
- Coordinates: 54°06′05″N 21°28′01″E
- Country: Poland
- Voivodeship: Warmian-Masurian
- County: Kętrzyn
- Gmina: Kętrzyn

Dąbrowa [dɔmˈbrɔva] is a settlement in the administrative district of Gmina Kętrzyn, within Kętrzyn County, Warmian-Masurian Voivodeship, in northern Poland.
