= Trzy Lipy, Warmian-Masurian Voivodeship =

Trzy Lipy
- Village
- Location within Poland
- Coordinates: 54°3′29″N 21°20′20″E
- Country: Poland
- Voivodeship: Warmian-Masurian
- County: Kętrzyn
- Gmina: Kętrzyn
- Population: 103

Trzy Lipy [ˈtʂɨ ˈlipɨ] is a village in the administrative district of Gmina Kętrzyn, within Kętrzyn County, Warmian-Masurian Voivodeship, in northern Poland.
