= Rybniki, Warmian-Masurian Voivodeship =

Rybniki
- Settlement
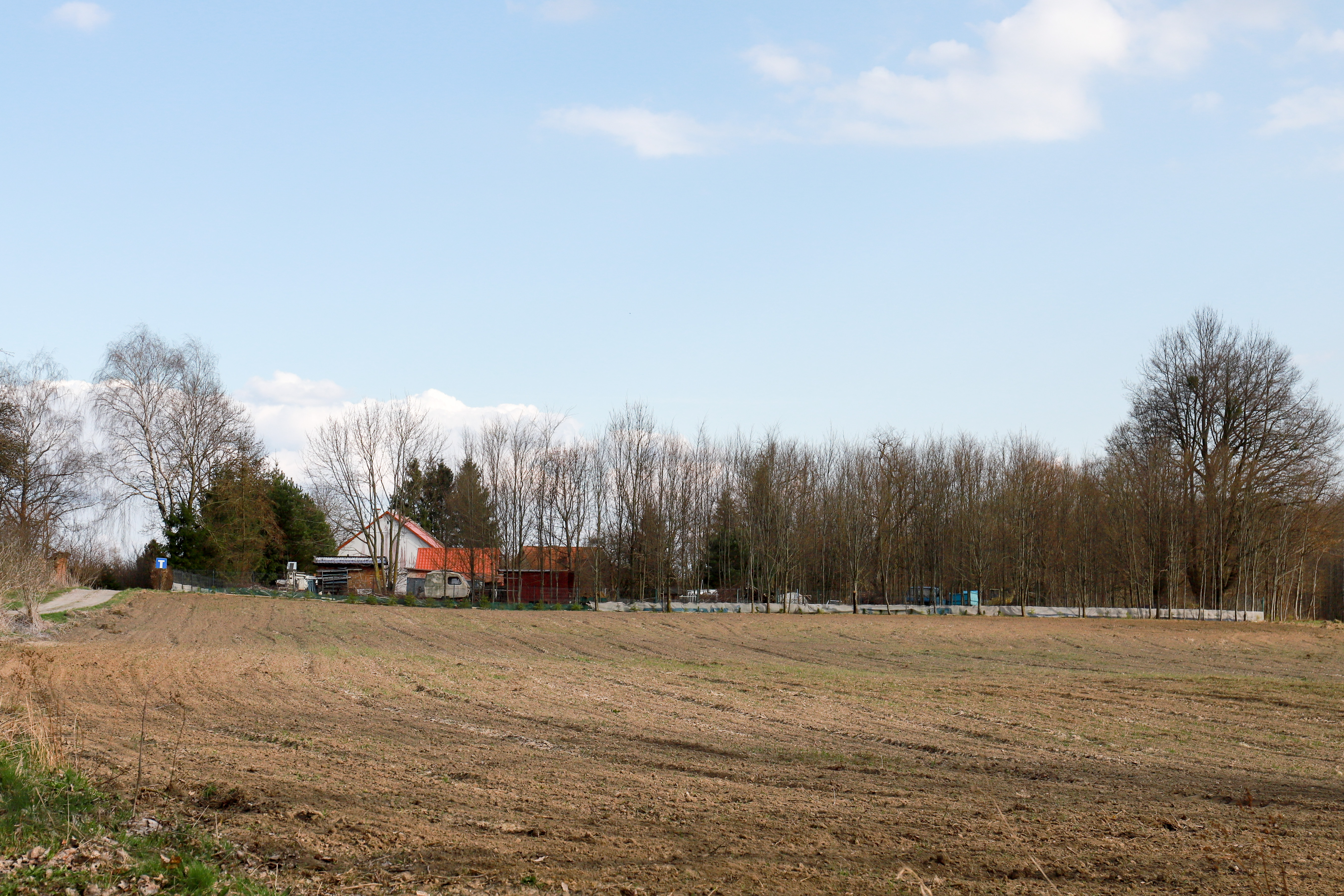

- Location within Poland
- Coordinates: 54°05′18″N 21°26′52″E
- Country: Poland
- Voivodeship: Warmian-Masurian
- County: Kętrzyn
- Gmina: Kętrzyn

Rybniki [rɨbˈniki] is a settlement in the administrative district of Gmina Kętrzyn, within Kętrzyn County, Warmian-Masurian Voivodeship, in northern Poland.
