= Olchowo, Warmian-Masurian Voivodeship =

Olchowo
- Village
- Location within Poland
- Coordinates: 54°06′44″N 21°19′10″E
- Country: Poland
- Voivodeship: Warmian-Masurian
- County: Kętrzyn
- Gmina: Kętrzyn

Olchowo [ɔlˈxɔvɔ] is a village in the administrative district of Gmina Kętrzyn, within Kętrzyn County, Warmian-Masurian Voivodeship, in northern Poland.
