= Brzeźnica, Gmina Kętrzyn =

Brzeźnica
- Village
- Location within Poland
- Coordinates: 54°3′23″N 21°22′36″E
- Country: Poland
- Voivodeship: Warmian-Masurian
- County: Kętrzyn
- Gmina: Kętrzyn

Brzeźnica [bʐɛʑˈnit͡sa] (German: Birkenwerder) is a village in the administrative district of Gmina Kętrzyn, within Kętrzyn County, Warmian-Masurian Voivodeship, in northern Poland.
