= Olchowo =

Olchowo may refer to the following places:

- Olchowo, Greater Poland Voivodeship (west-central Poland)
- Olchowo, Warmian-Masurian Voivodeship (north Poland)
- Olchowo, West Pomeranian Voivodeship (north-west Poland)
