= Gmina Kętrzyn =

Gmina Kętrzyn Kętrzyn Commune
- Gmina
- Coat of arms
- Interactive map of Gmina Kętrzyn
- Coordinates (Kętrzyn): 54°5′N 21°23′E
- Country: Poland
- Voivodeship: Warmian-Masurian
- County: Kętrzyn
- Seat: Kętrzyn

Area
  - Total: 285.73 km^{2} (110.32 sq mi)

Population (2006)
  - Total: 8,285
  - Density: 29.00/km^{2} (75.10/sq mi)

Gmina Kętrzyn is a rural gmina (administrative district) in Kętrzyn County, Warmian-Masurian Voivodeship, in northern Poland. Its seat is the town of Kętrzyn, although the town is not part of the territory of the gmina.

The gmina covers an area of 285.73 square kilometres (110.3 sq mi), and as of 2006 its total population is 8,285.

== Villages ==
Gmina Kętrzyn contains the villages and settlements of:

- Bałowo
- Bałtrucie
- Banaszki
- Biedaszki
- Biedaszki Małe
- Brzeźnica
- Cegielnia
- Czerniki
- Dąbrowa
- Działki
- Filipówka
- Gałwuny
- Gierłoż
- Gnatowo
- Gnatowo-Kolonia
- Godzikowo
- Góry
- Grabno
- Gromki
- Gryzławki
- Henrykowo
- Jankowo
- Jeżewo
- Karolewo
- Kaskajmy
- Katkajmy
- Koczarki
- Kotkowo
- Kruszewiec
- Kwiedzina
- Langanki
- Łazdoje
- Linkowo
- Marszewo
- Martiany
- Mażany
- Muławki
- Muławki-Dwór
- Nakomiady
- Nowa Różanka
- Nowa Wieś Kętrzyńska
- Nowa Wieś Mała
- Nowy Mikielnik
- Nowy Młyn
- Olchowo
- Osewo
- Ostry Róg
- Owczarki
- Owczarnia
- Parcz
- Poganówko
- Poganowo
- Porębek
- Pożarki
- Pręgowo
- Przeczniak
- Rybniki
- Salpik
- Sławkowo
- Smokowo
- Stachowizna
- Stadniki
- Stara Różanka
- Strzyże
- Suchodoły
- Sykstyny
- Trzy Lipy
- Ugiertowo
- Wajsznory
- Wilamowo
- Wilkowo
- Windykajmy
- Wólka
- Wopławki
- Wymiarki
- Zalesie Kętrzyńskie

== Neighbouring gminas ==
Gmina Kętrzyn is bordered by the town of Kętrzyn and by the gminas of Barciany, Giżycko, Korsze, Mrągowo, Reszel, Ryn, Srokowo and Węgorzewo.
