= Zalesie Kętrzyńskie =

- Village
- Location within Poland
- Coordinates: 54°1′N 21°23′E
- Country: Poland
- Voivodeship: Warmian-Masurian
- County: Kętrzyn
- Gmina: Kętrzyn

Zalesie Kętrzyńskie [zaˈlɛɕɛ kɛnˈtʂɨɲskʲɛ] (German: Hinzendorf) is a village in the administrative district of Gmina Kętrzyn, within Kętrzyn County, Warmian-Masurian Voivodeship, in northern Poland.
