= Poganowo =

- Village
- Location within Poland
- Coordinates: 54°1′29″N 21°24′3″E
- Country: Poland
- Voivodeship: Warmian-Masurian
- County: Kętrzyn
- Gmina: Kętrzyn
- Population: 0

Poganowo [pɔɡaˈnɔvɔ] is a former village in the administrative district of Gmina Kętrzyn, within Kętrzyn County, Warmian-Masurian Voivodeship, in northern Poland.
