= Brzeźnica, Silesian Voivodeship =

Brzeźnica
- Village
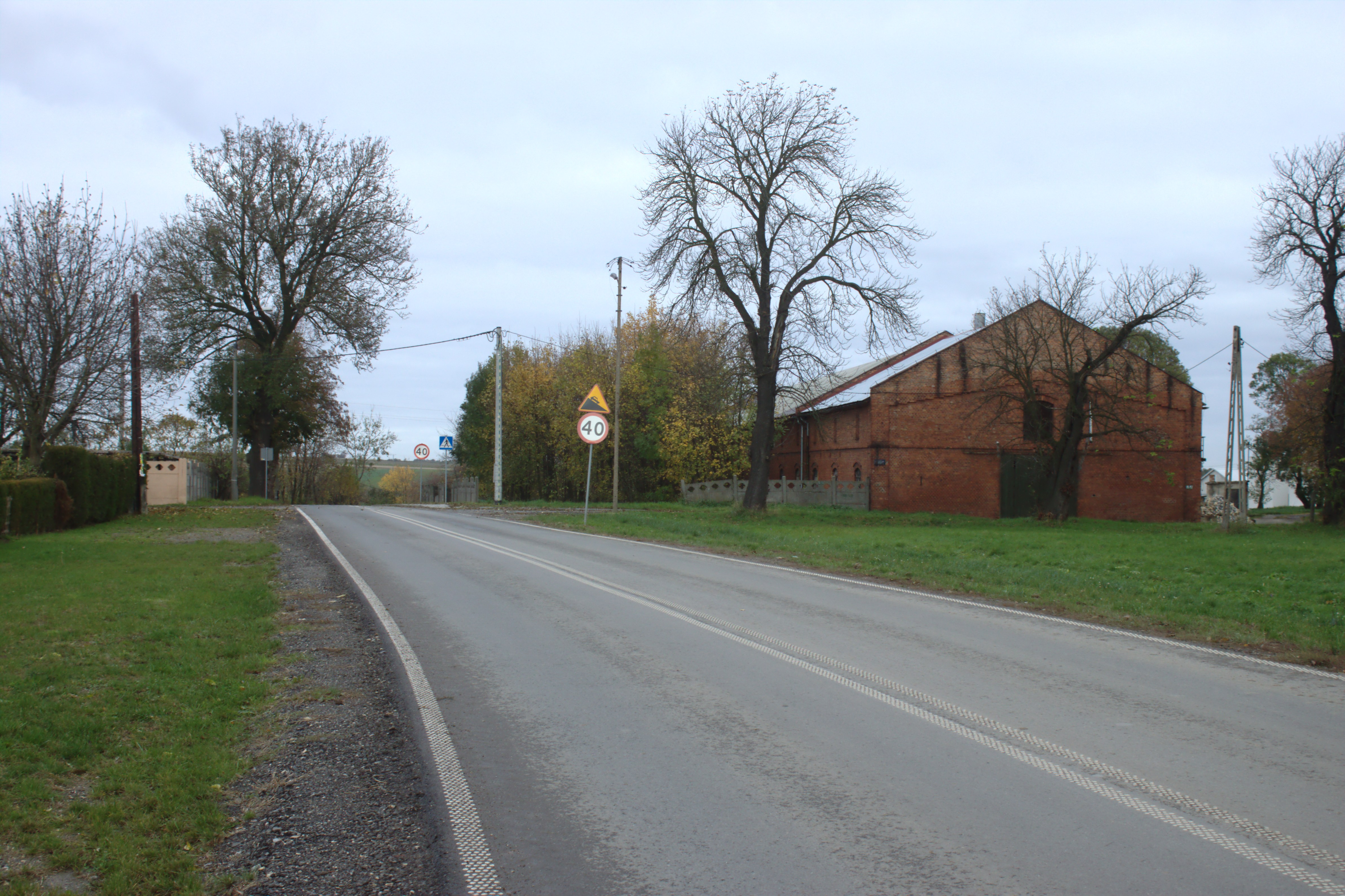
- Entrance to the village

- Location within Poland
- Coordinates: 50°8′52″N 18°13′0″E
- Country: Poland
- Voivodeship: Silesian
- County: Racibórz
- Gmina: Rudnik
- Population: 597

Brzeźnica [bʐɛʑˈnit͡sa] is a village in the administrative district of Gmina Rudnik, within Racibórz County, Silesian Voivodeship, in southern Poland.

== Gallery ==
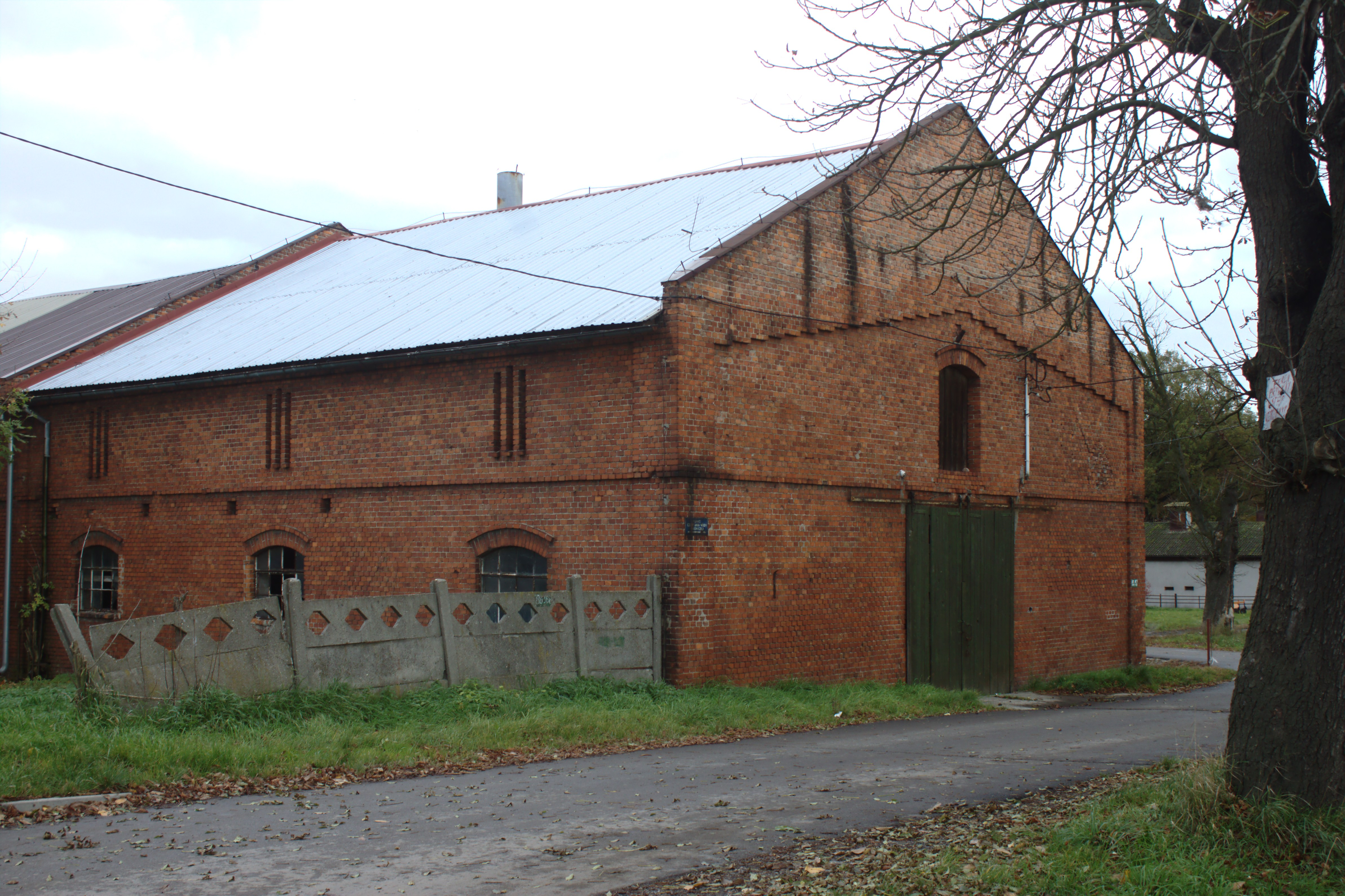
Brick house

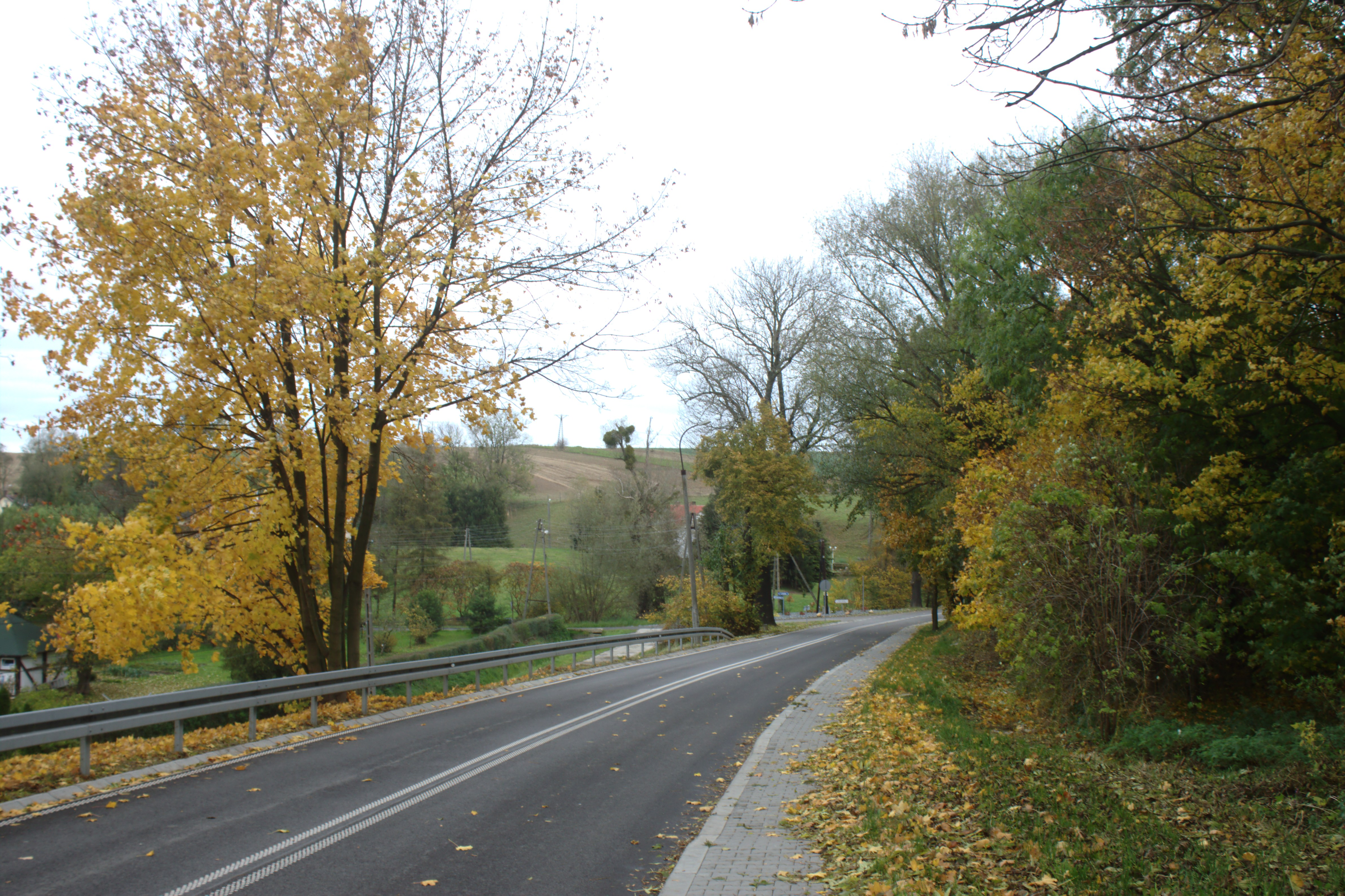
Street

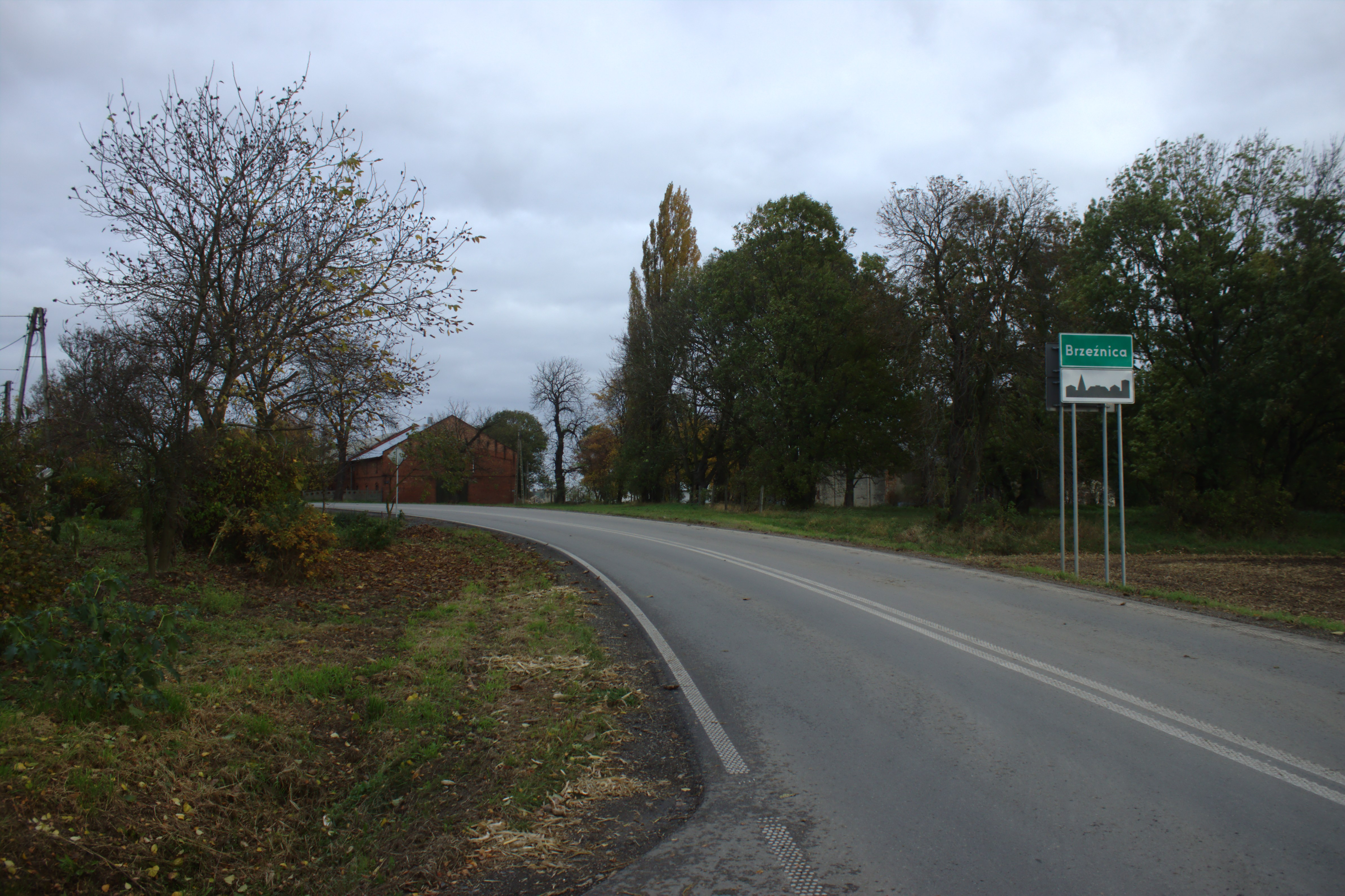
End of the village
