= Kętrzyn County =

Kętrzyn County Powiat kętrzyński
- County
- Flag Coat of arms

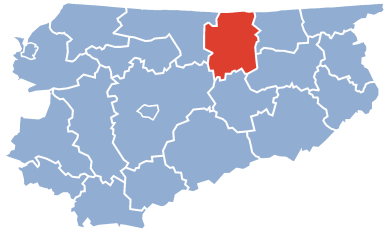
- Location within the voivodeship

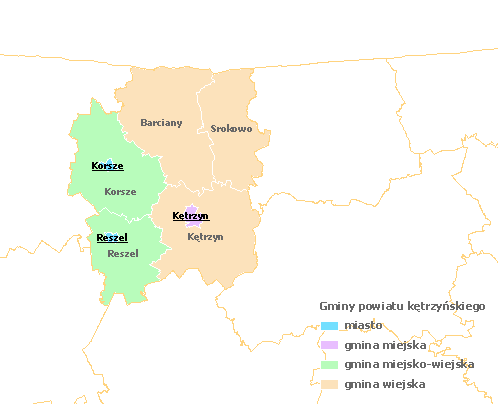
- Division into gminas
- Coordinates (Kętrzyn): 54°5′N 21°23′E
- Country: Poland
- Voivodeship: (Warmian–Masurian Voivodeship) Warmian-Masurian
- Seat: Kętrzyn
- Gminas: Total 6 (incl. 1 urban): Kętrzyn; Gmina Barciany; Gmina Kętrzyn; Gmina Korsze; Gmina Reszel; Gmina Srokowo

Area
  - Total: 1,212.97 km^{2} (468.33 sq mi)

Population (2006)
  - Total: 66,165
  - Density: 54.548/km^{2} (141.28/sq mi)
  - Urban: 37,730
  - Rural: 28,435
- Car plates: NKE
- Website: www.starostwo.ketrzyn.pl

Kętrzyn County (Polish: powiat kętrzyński) is a unit of territorial administration and local government (powiat) in Warmian-Masurian Voivodeship, northern Poland, on the border with Russia. It came into being on January 1, 1999, as a result of the Polish local government reforms passed in 1998. Its administrative seat and largest town is Kętrzyn (former Rastembork), which lies 88 kilometres (55 mi) north-east of the regional capital Olsztyn. The county also contains the towns of Reszel, lying 16 km (10 mi) west of Kętrzyn, and Korsze, 19 km (12 mi) north-west of Kętrzyn.

The county covers an area of 1,212.97 square kilometres (468.3 sq mi). As of 2006 its total population is 66,165, out of which the population of Kętrzyn is 28,000, that of Reszel is 5,098, that of Korsze is 4,632, and the rural population is 28,435.

== Neighbouring counties ==
Kętrzyn County is bordered by Węgorzewo County and Giżycko County to the east, Mrągowo County to the south, and Olsztyn County and Bartoszyce County to the west. It also borders Russia (Kaliningrad Oblast) to the north.

== Administrative divisions ==
The county is subdivided into six gminas (one urban, two urban-rural and three rural). These are listed in the following table, in descending order of population.

Gmina	Type	Area (km^{2})	Population (2006)	Seat
Kętrzyn	urban	10.3	28,000	
Gmina Korsze	urban-rural	249.9	10,561	Korsze
Gmina Reszel	urban-rural	178.7	8,335	Reszel
Gmina Kętrzyn	rural	285.7	8,285	Kętrzyn *
Gmina Barciany	rural	293.6	6,735	Barciany
Gmina Srokowo	rural	194.6	4,249	Srokowo
* seat not part of the gmina
