= Kreis Rößel =

Prussian district

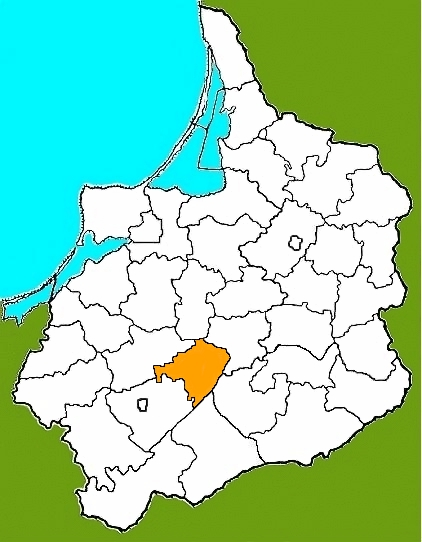
Location in East Prussia

The Rößel district was a Prussian district in the administrative region of Königsberg (and later Allenstein) in the Prussian province of East Prussia. It was located in Warmia in the middle of East Prussia and existed from 1818 to 1945. The seat of the district administration was initially Rößel (Reszel) and, from 1862, Bischofsburg (Biskupiec).

== Geography ==
The area of the district was 850.84 km^{2} and was located northeast of Landkreis Allenstein. The four towns of the district, Rößel, Bischofsburg, Seeburg and Bischofstein, were located in the four corners of the district and promoted economic life. However, the district did not have a clear center.

From the heights of the Baltic Uplands, the landscape merges north into the Schippenbeil plain. The south-western area is touched by the Allenstein Lake District, the 10 km^{2} Daddaisee (today Jezioro Dadaj) and the Lauternsee (Jezioro Luterskie) were the largest lakes in the district. Near the Lauternsee in the center of the district was the 220m high Voigtsdorfer Berg, the highest point. The northeast is touched by the river Zaine, the only river of note in the district.

The district of Rößel was one of the smaller districts of East Prussia in terms of area, but was the most densely populated with 61 inhabitants per km^{2} at times. In 1939, 51,086 people lived in the district, 88.3 percent of them being of Catholic faith. While there were still 339 Jews in 1890, their number fell steadily afterwards: in 1925 there were 132, in 1933 only 108. In 1900, the Polish minority was reported to be 14%.

The towns of Bischofstein and Bischofsburg were located on Reichsstrasse 128 Königsberg - Ortelsburg, and Reichsstrasse 141 Allenburg – Bischofsburg ran through Rößel. In addition, the Insterburg – Allenstein and Wormditt – Rastenburg railway lines ran through the district. The main sources of income were agriculture and forestry.

== History ==
=== Medieval period ===
The history of the district was determined for a long time by the Prince-Bishopric of Warmia, which existed as a semi-independent ecclesiastical state for several centuries. It was created in 1243 and was administratively divided into ten chamber offices, seven of which were subordinate to the Warmian bishop and three to the cathedral chapter. The area of the later district lay in the chamber offices of Rößel and Seeburg, which belonged to the episcopal domain. As a result of the Second Peace of Thorn in 1466, the entire diocese of Warmia came under Polish suzerainty, which lasted until the First Partition of Poland in 1772, when it was annexed by Prussia. After the incorporation into the Prussian state, the two districts of Braunsberg and Heilsberg were set up in Warmia in 1773, both of which were assigned to the Königsberg War and Domain Chamber.

=== Modern period ===
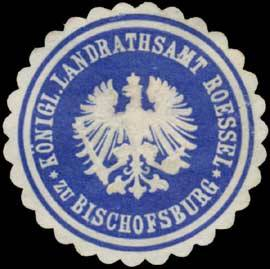
Seal mark Royal District Office Rössel, East Prussia

As part of the Prussian administrative reforms, a comprehensive district reform in all of East Prussia was necessary, as the districts established in 1752 and 1773 had proven to be inexpedient and too large. In Warmia, the new Rößel district was formed from the southeastern part of the old Heilsberg district with effect from 1 February 1818. It essentially comprised the area of the former Warmian chamber offices of Rößel and Seeburg, namely the Catholic parishes of:

- Bischofsburg
- Bischofstein
- Frankenau
- Freudenberg
- Glockstein
- Groß Bössau
- Groß Köllen
- Lautern
- Legienen
- Plausen
- Prossitten
- Rössel
- Santoppen
- Seeburg
- Sturmhübel

Initially, Rößel was designated as the district capital, but in 1862 it was relocated to Bischofsburg. Initially, the district was part of the Prussian government region of Königsberg, and on 1 November 1905 it was assigned to the newly founded Allenstein government region.

=== After World War I ===
After the end of World War I, according to the Treaty of Versailles, the East Prussian plebiscite was held on 11 July 1920 to determine whether the area would remain in Germany or join Poland. Due to the clear result in favour of Germany, the Rößel district remained in the Reich.

Towards the end of World War II in January 1945, the Soviet Red Army captured the Rößel district without much of a fight. The towns and villages were partly destroyed by the Red Army. In March 1945, the Red Army placed the district together with the southern half of East Prussia under Polish administration. The local German population was expelled and the area was settled by Poles, many of whom came from the eastern borderlands of interwar Poland.

The district area is now divided between Bartoszyce County, Kętrzyn County and Olsztyn County in Warmian-Masurian Voivodeship, Poland.

== Demographics ==
The district had a German majority with a significant Polish minority.

Ethnolinguistic structure in Kreis Rößel
Year	1825		1831		1846		1910	
German	23,927	77.9%	27,399	84.2%	32,521	85.1%	43,189	85.6%
Polish / Bilingual	6,778	22.1%	5,125	15.8%	5,681	14.9%	7,283	14.4%
Total	30,705		32,524		38,202		50,472	

== Politics ==
In the German Empire, the Rößel district together with the Allenstein district formed the Reichstag electoral district of Königsberg 9. This strongly Catholic constituency was won by candidates from the Centre Party in almost all Reichstag elections between 1871 and 1912. Only in the Reichstag elections of 1893 was a representative of the Polish Party, Anton von Wolszlegier, able to win the mandate.

== Municipalities ==
At the end of its existence in 1945, the Rößel district comprised 4 towns and 81 rural communities:

- Adlig Wolken
- Atkamp
- Bansen
- Begnitten
- Bergenthal
- Bischdorf
- Bischofsburg, town
- Bischofstein, town
- Bredinken
- Buchenberg
- Bürgerdorf
- Damerau
- Elsau
- Fleming
- Frankenau
- Freudenberg
- Fürstenau
- Gerthen
- Glockstein
- Groß Bößau
- Groß Köllen
- Groß Mönsdorf
- Groß Wolken
- Heinrichsdorf
- Kabienen
- Kekitten
- Klackendorf
- Klawsdorf
- Klein Bößau
- Kleisack
- Komienen
- Krämersdorf
- Krausen
- Krausenstein
- Krokau
- Labuch
- Landau
- Lautern
- Legienen
- Lekitten
- Linglack
- Lokau
- Loßainen
- Modlainen
- Molditten
- Nassen
- Neudims
- Ottern
- Paudling
- Plausen
- Plößen
- Polkeim
- Porwangen
- Prossitten
- Raschung
- Ridbach
- Robaben
- Rochlack
- Rosenschön
- Rößel, town
- Rothfließ
- Samlack
- Santoppen
- Sauerbaum
- Scharnigk
- Schellen
- Schönborn
- Schöndorf
- Schöneberg
- Seeburg, town
- Soweiden
- Sternsee
- Stockhausen
- Sturmhübel
- Teistimmen
- Tollnigk
- Tornienen
- Voigtsdorf
- Waldensee
- Walkeim
- Wangst
- Wengoyen
- Willims
- Wonneberg
- Zehnhuben

=== Municipalities dissolved before 1945 ===
- Bodzianowo, on 30 September 1928 to Bansen
- Plönhöfen, in 1910 to Loszainen
- Potritten, on 30 September 1928 to Walkeim
- Zabrodzin, on 30 September 1929 to Schöndorf

== Place names ==
In the course of the 20th century, most recently in 1938, several parishes were renamed:

- Adlig Wolka → Adlig Wolken (1938)
- Bukowagurra → Buchenberg (1927)
- Görkendorf → Teistimmen (1927)
- Groß Ottern → Ottern (1928)
- Groß Wolka → Groß Wolken (1938)
- Labendzowo → Legienen (1932)
- Loszainen → Loßainen (1936)
- Pissau → Waldensee (1910)
- Robawen → Robaben (1938)
- Stanislewo → Sternsee (1931)
- Striewo → Stockhausen (1928)
