= Sajna (river) =

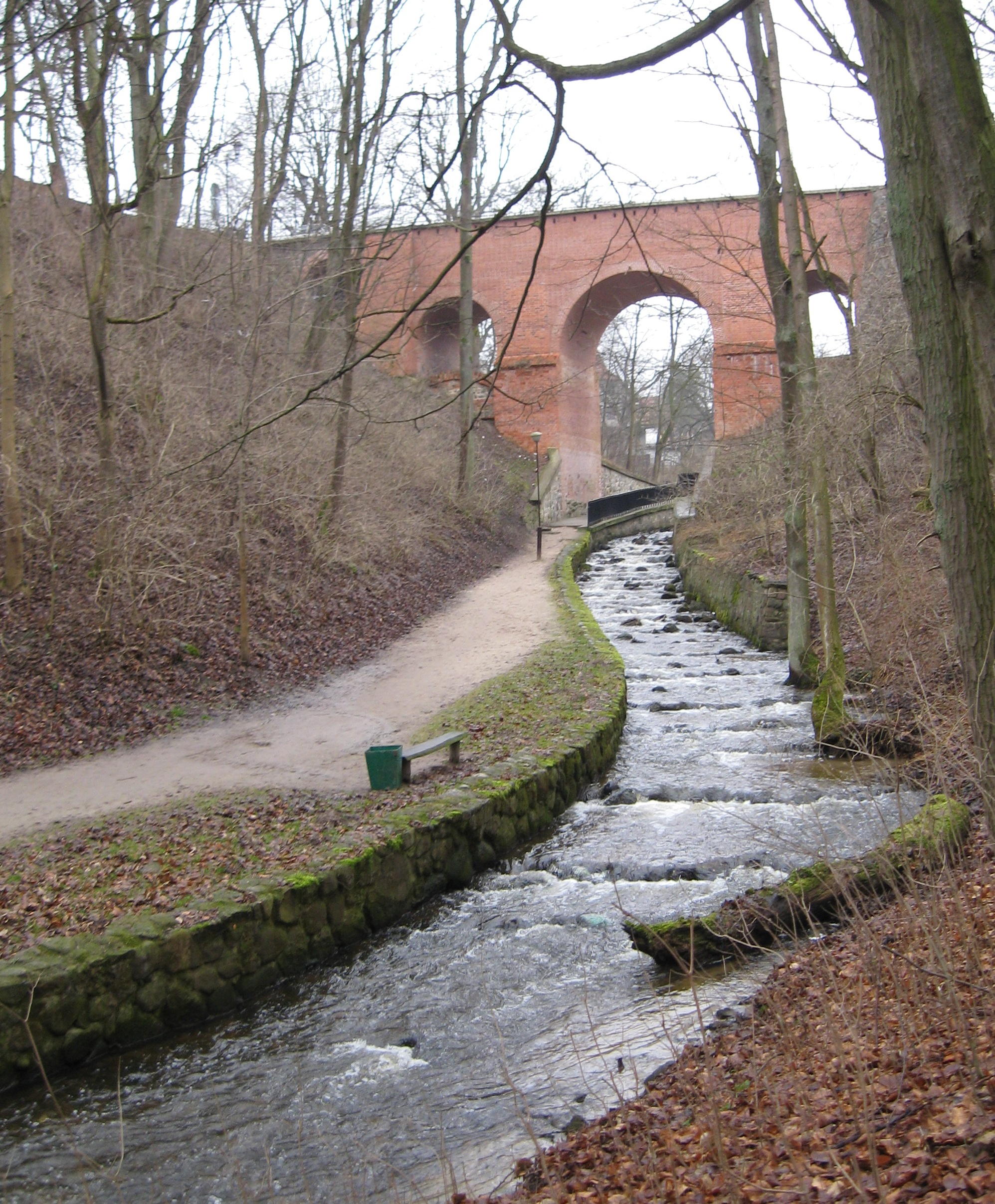
- The Sajna at the town of Reszel

Location
- Country: Poland
- Voivodeship: Warmian–Masurian
- County (Powiat): Kętrzyn

Physical characteristics
- Source
  - location: near Widryny, Gmina Reszel
  - coordinates: 53°58′05″N 21°12′18″E
- Mouth: Guber
  - location: Sątoczno, Gmina Korsze
  - coordinates: 54°14′04″N 21°05′48″E
- Length: 50.6 km (31.4 mi)
- Basin size: 500.6 km^{2} (193.3 mi^{2})
- Discharge
  - average: 3 m^{3}/s (110 cu ft/s)

Basin features
- Progression: Guber→ Łyna→ Pregolya→ Baltic Sea

Sajna is a river of northeastern Poland, a tributary of the Guber in Sątoczno.
