= Sątoczno =

Sątoczno may refer to the following villages in Poland:

- Sątoczno, Pomeranian Voivodeship
- Sątoczno, Warmian-Masurian Voivodeship
