= Wójtowo =

Wójtowo may refer to the following places:

- Wójtowo, Lidzbark County in Warmian-Masurian Voivodeship (north Poland)
- Wójtowo, Gmina Barczewo in Warmian-Masurian Voivodeship (north Poland)
- Wójtowo, Gmina Kolno in Warmian-Masurian Voivodeship (north Poland)
