= Lekity =

- Village
- Location within Poland
- Coordinates: 53°59′N 20°42′E
- Country: Poland
- Voivodeship: Warmian-Masurian
- County: Olsztyn
- Gmina: Jeziorany
- Population (2006): 130

Lekity [lɛˈkitɨ] is a village in the administrative district of Gmina Jeziorany, within Olsztyn County, Warmian-Masurian Voivodeship, in northern Poland. It is approximately 3 km (2 mi) northwest of Jeziorany and 26 km (16 mi) northeast of the regional capital Olsztyn.
