= Gmina Kolno =

Gmina Kolno may refer to either of the following rural administrative districts in Poland:

- Gmina Kolno, Podlaskie Voivodeship
- Gmina Kolno, Warmian-Masurian Voivodeship
