= Lipowa Góra =

Lipowa Góra may refer to:

- Lipowa Góra, Podlaskie Voivodeship (north-east Poland)
- Lipowa Góra, Kętrzyn County in Warmian-Masurian Voivodeship (north Poland)
- Lipowa Góra, Ostróda County in Warmian-Masurian Voivodeship (north Poland)
