= Pilecki =

Pilecki Leliwa coat of arms used by some of Pilecki family

Pilecki (Polish pronunciation: [piˈlɛt͡skʲi]; feminine: Pilecka; plural: Pileccy) is a Polish surname. Some of them use: Ciołek coat of arms, Doliwa coat of arms, Leliwa coat of arms, Łabędź coat of arms or Topór coat of arms.

It may refer to:

- Daniela Walkowiak-Pilecka (born 1935), Polish sprint canoer
- Elizabeth Granowska or Pilecka (c. 1372–1420), Queen consort of Poland
- Francis J. Pilecki (1934–1999), American administrator
- Joanna Pilecka (born 1976), Polish diplomat
- Otton Pilecki (1320–1385), Polish nobleman, starost of Ruthenia, Greater Poland and Sandomierz
- Stan Pilecki (1947–2017), Australian rugby union player
- Witold Pilecki (1901–1948), Polish cavalry officer, intelligence agent and resistance leader

== Other ==
- Pilecki Institute, Polish government institution
- Pilecki Medal
- Wólka Pilecka, a village in Poland
