= Śpigiel =

- Village
- Location within Poland
- Coordinates: 53°58′2″N 21°13′4″E
- Country: Poland
- Voivodeship: Warmian-Masurian
- County: Kętrzyn
- Gmina: Reszel
- Population: 8

Śpigiel [ˈɕpiɡʲɛl] is a village in the administrative district of Gmina Reszel, within Kętrzyn County, Warmian-Masurian Voivodeship, in northern Poland.
