= Lutry, Poland =

Lutry
- Village
- Location within Poland
- Coordinates: 54°1′N 20°54′E
- Country: Poland
- Voivodeship: Warmian-Masurian
- County: Olsztyn
- Gmina: Kolno

Lutry [ˈlutrɨ] is a village in the administrative district of Gmina Kolno, within Olsztyn County, Warmian-Masurian Voivodeship, in northern Poland.
