= Bezławecki Dwór =

- Settlement
- Location within Poland
- Coordinates: 54°1′36″N 21°15′20″E
- Country: Poland
- Voivodeship: Warmian-Masurian
- County: Kętrzyn
- Gmina: Reszel
- Population: 6

Bezławecki Dwór [bɛzwaˈvɛt͡ski ˈdvur] is a settlement in the administrative district of Gmina Reszel, within Kętrzyn County, Warmian-Masurian Voivodeship, in northern Poland.
