= Czarnowiec, Warmian-Masurian Voivodeship =

Czarnowiec
- Village
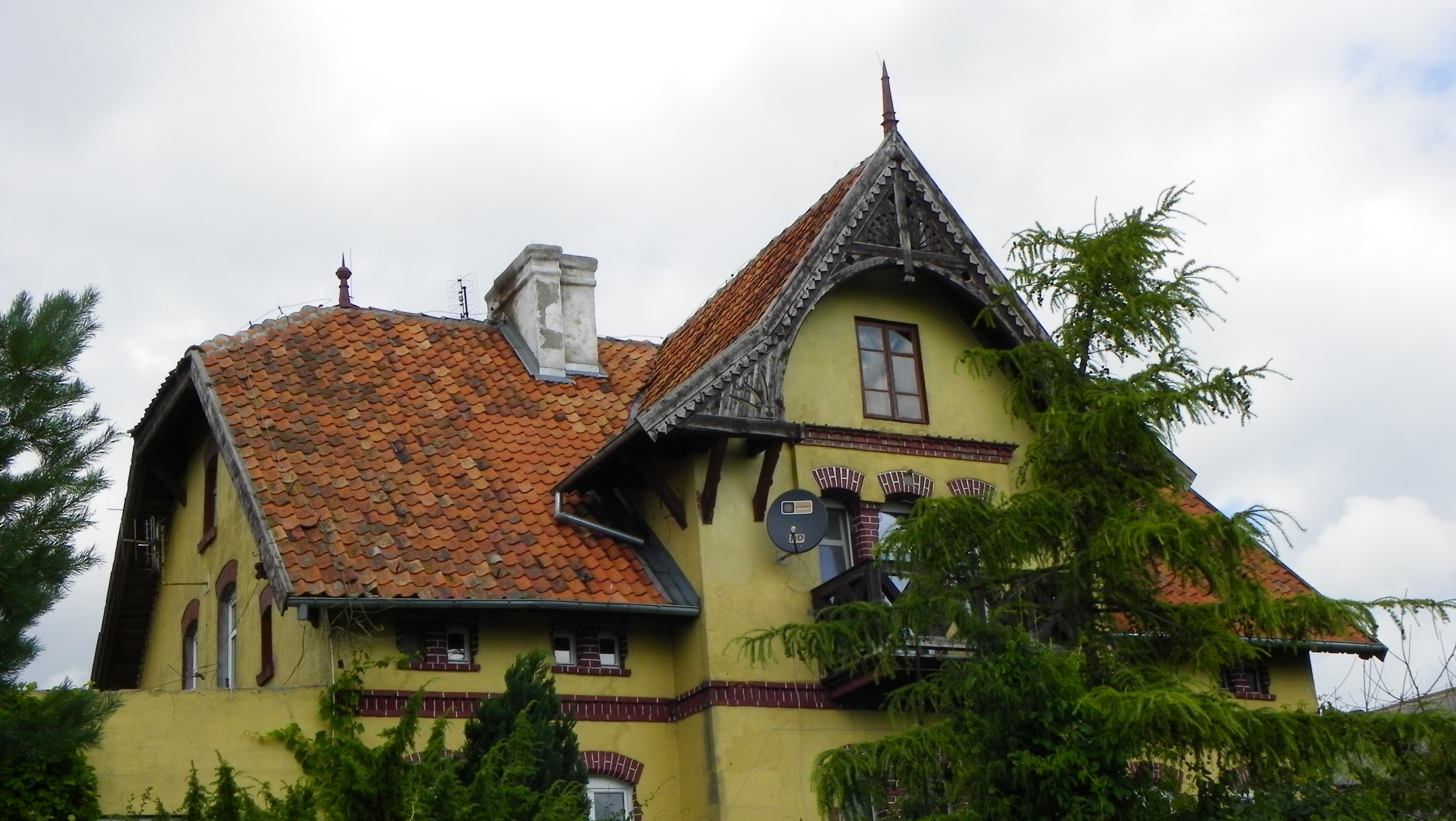

- Location within Poland
- Coordinates: 54°3′N 21°6′E
- Country: Poland
- Voivodeship: Warmian-Masurian
- County: Kętrzyn
- Gmina: Reszel
- Population: 107

Czarnowiec [t͡ʂarˈnɔvjɛt͡s] is a village in the administrative district of Gmina Reszel, within Kętrzyn County, Warmian-Masurian Voivodeship, in northern Poland.
