= Wólka Ryńska =

- Village
- Location within Poland
- Coordinates: 54°2′53″N 21°9′35″E
- Country: Poland
- Voivodeship: Warmian-Masurian
- County: Kętrzyn
- Gmina: Reszel
- Population (2021): 41

Wólka Ryńska [ˈvulka ˈrɨɲska] is a village in the administrative district of Gmina Reszel, within Kętrzyn County, Warmian-Masurian Voivodeship, in northern Poland.
