= Kruzy, Warmian-Masurian Voivodeship =

Kruzy
- Village
- Location within Poland
- Coordinates: 53°57′41″N 20°56′48″E
- Country: Poland
- Voivodeship: Warmian-Masurian
- County: Olsztyn
- Gmina: Kolno

Kruzy [ˈkruzɨ] is a village in the administrative district of Gmina Kolno, within Olsztyn County, Warmian-Masurian Voivodeship, in northern Poland.

Before 1772 the area was part of Kingdom of Poland, and in 1772–1945 it belonged to Prussia and Germany (East Prussia).
