= Franknowo =

- Village
- Location within Poland
- Coordinates: 54°2′5″N 20°45′9″E
- Country: Poland
- Voivodeship: Warmian-Masurian
- County: Olsztyn
- Gmina: Jeziorany
- Population (2006): 960

Franknowo [frankˈnɔvɔ] is a village in the administrative district of Gmina Jeziorany, within Olsztyn County, Warmian-Masurian Voivodeship, in northern Poland.
