= Studzianka, Warmian-Masurian Voivodeship =

Studzianka
- Village
- Location within Poland
- Coordinates: 53°57′N 20°36′E
- Country: Poland
- Voivodeship: Warmian-Masurian
- County: Olsztyn
- Gmina: Jeziorany
- Population (2006): 400

Studzianka [stuˈd͡ʑanka] is a village in the administrative district of Gmina Jeziorany, within Olsztyn County, Warmian-Masurian Voivodeship, in northern Poland.
