= Kocibórz =

- Village
- Location within Poland
- Coordinates: 54°0′34″N 21°10′47″E
- Country: Poland
- Voivodeship: Warmian-Masurian
- County: Kętrzyn
- Gmina: Reszel

Population
  - Total: 83

Kocibórz [kɔˈt͡ɕibuʂ] is a village in the administrative district of Gmina Reszel, within Kętrzyn County, Warmian-Masurian Voivodeship, in northern Poland.
