= Biel, Warmian-Masurian Voivodeship =

Biel
- Village
- Location within Poland
- Coordinates: 54°2′55″N 21°5′25″E
- Country: Poland
- Voivodeship: Warmian-Masurian
- County: Kętrzyn
- Gmina: Reszel
- Population: 6

Biel [bjɛl] is a village in the administrative district of Gmina Reszel, within Kętrzyn County, Warmian-Masurian Voivodeship, in northern Poland.
