= Ryn Reszelski =

- Village
- Location within Poland
- Coordinates: 54°2′N 21°1′E
- Country: Poland
- Voivodeship: Warmian-Masurian
- County: Olsztyn
- Gmina: Kolno

Ryn Reszelski [ˈrɨn rɛˈʂɛlski] is a village in the administrative district of Gmina Kolno, within Olsztyn County, Warmian-Masurian Voivodeship, in northern Poland.
