= Miejska Wieś =

- Village
- Location within Poland
- Coordinates: 53°58′N 20°48′E
- Country: Poland
- Voivodeship: Warmian-Masurian
- County: Olsztyn
- Gmina: Jeziorany
- Population (2006): 490

Miejska Wieś [ˈmjɛi̯ska ˈvjɛɕ] is a village in the administrative district of Gmina Jeziorany, within Olsztyn County, Warmian-Masurian Voivodeship, in northern Poland.
