= Gmina Jeziorany =

Gmina Jeziorany Jeziorany Commune
- Gmina
- Coat of arms
- Interactive map of Gmina Jeziorany
- Coordinates (Jeziorany): 53°58′N 20°44′E
- Country: Poland
- Voivodeship: Warmian-Masurian
- County: Olsztyn County
- Seat: Jeziorany

Area
  - Total: 213.51 km^{2} (82.44 sq mi)

Population (2006)
  - Total: 8,140
  - Density: 38.1/km^{2} (98.7/sq mi)
  - Urban: 3,376
  - Rural: 4,764

Gmina Jeziorany is an urban-rural gmina (administrative district) in Olsztyn County, Warmian-Masurian Voivodeship, in northern Poland. Its seat is the town of Jeziorany, which lies approximately 26 kilometres (16 mi) north-east of the regional capital Olsztyn.

The gmina covers an area of 213.51 square kilometres (82.4 sq mi), and as of 2006 its total population is 8,140 (out of which the population of Jeziorany amounts to 3,376, and the population of the rural part of the gmina is 4,764).

== Villages ==
Apart from the town of Jeziorany, Gmina Jeziorany contains the villages and settlements of Derc, Franknowo, Jeziorany-Kolonie, Kalis, Kiersztanowo, Kikity, Kostrzewy, Kramarzewo, Krokowo, Lekity, Miejska Wieś, Modliny, Olszewnik, Pierwągi, Piszewo, Polkajmy, Potryty, Radostowo, Studnica, Studzianka, Tłokowo, Ustnik, Wilkiejmy, Wójtówko, Wólka Szlachecka, Żardeniki and Zerbuń.

== Neighbouring gminas ==
Gmina Jeziorany is bordered by the gminas of Barczewo, Biskupiec, Bisztynek, Dobre Miasto, Dywity, Kiwity, Kolno and Lidzbark Warmiński.
