= Siemki =

- Village
- Location within Poland
- Coordinates: 54°5′N 21°15′E
- Country: Poland
- Voivodeship: Warmian-Masurian
- County: Kętrzyn
- Gmina: Reszel
- Elevation: 118 m (387 ft)
- Population: 119

Siemki [ˈɕɛmki] is a village in the administrative district of Gmina Reszel, within Kętrzyn County, Warmian-Masurian Voivodeship, in northern Poland.
