= Guber =

Guber is a surname. Notable people with the surname include:

- Jasminka Guber (born 1985), Bosnian middle-distance runner
- Lee Guber (1920–1988), American theater impresario
- Peter Guber (born 1942), American business executive, entrepreneur, educator, and author
- Rebeca Guber (1926–2020), Argentine mathematician, university professor, textbook author
- Rivka Guber (1902–1981), Israeli social worker and pioneer, recipient of the Israel Prize
- Susan Guber (born 1938), American politician in the state of Florida

== See also ==
- Guber-Peters Entertainment Company, American game show production company
- Mali Guber, village in the municipality of Livno, Bosnia and Herzegovina
- Veliki Guber, village in the municipality of Livno, Bosnia and Herzegovina
