= Worpławki =

- Village
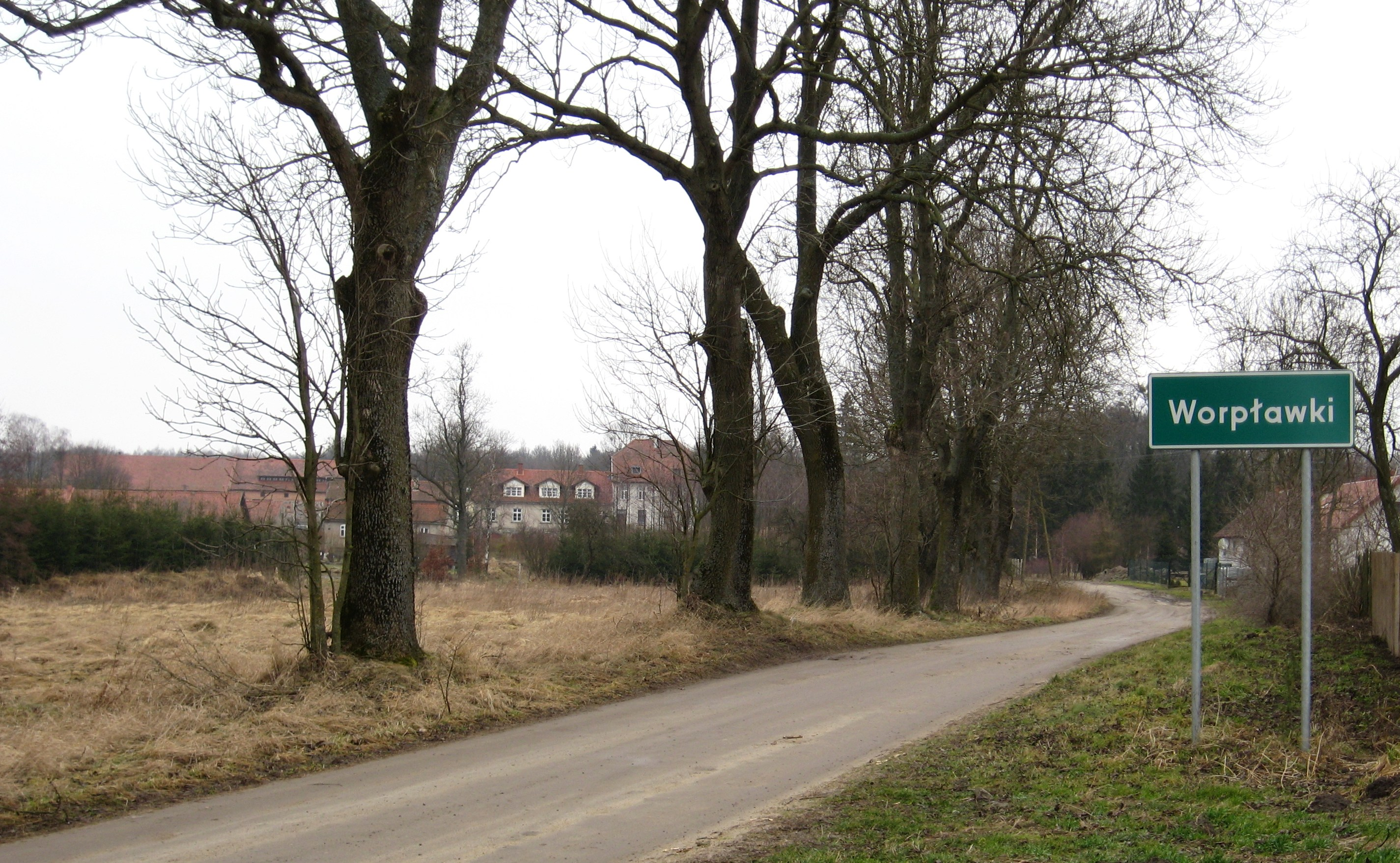

- Location within Poland
- Coordinates: 54°5′6″N 21°10′16″E
- Country: Poland
- Voivodeship: Warmian-Masurian
- County: Kętrzyn
- Gmina: Reszel

Worpławki [vɔrˈpwafki] is a village in the administrative district of Gmina Reszel, within Kętrzyn County, Warmian-Masurian Voivodeship, in northern Poland.
