= Kostrzewy, Warmian-Masurian Voivodeship =

Kostrzewy
- Village
- Location within Poland
- Coordinates: 53°57′N 20°46′E
- Country: Poland
- Voivodeship: Warmian-Masurian
- County: Olsztyn
- Gmina: Jeziorany

Kostrzewy [kɔsˈtʂɛvɨ] is a village in the administrative district of Gmina Jeziorany, within Olsztyn County, Warmian-Masurian Voivodeship, in northern Poland.
