= Pilec =

- Village
- Location within Poland
- Coordinates: 53°59′3″N 21°14′9″E
- Country: Poland
- Voivodeship: Warmian-Masurian
- County: Kętrzyn
- Gmina: Reszel
- Population (2021): 205

Pilec [ˈpilɛt͡s] is a village in the administrative district of Gmina Reszel, within Kętrzyn County, Warmian-Masurian Voivodeship, in northern Poland.
