= Derc =

- Village
- Location within Poland
- Coordinates: 53°57′N 20°38′E
- Country: Poland
- Voivodeship: Warmian-Masurian
- County: Olsztyn
- Gmina: Jeziorany
- Population (2006): 660

Derc [dɛrt͡s] is a village in the administrative district of Gmina Jeziorany, within Olsztyn County, Warmian-Masurian Voivodeship, in northern Poland.
