= Kolenko =

- Settlement
- Location within Poland
- Coordinates: 53°58′N 21°0′E
- Country: Poland
- Voivodeship: Warmian-Masurian
- County: Olsztyn
- Gmina: Kolno

Kolenko [kɔˈlɛnkɔ] is a settlement in the administrative district of Gmina Kolno, within Olsztyn County, Warmian-Masurian Voivodeship, in northern Poland.
