= Bęsia =

- Village
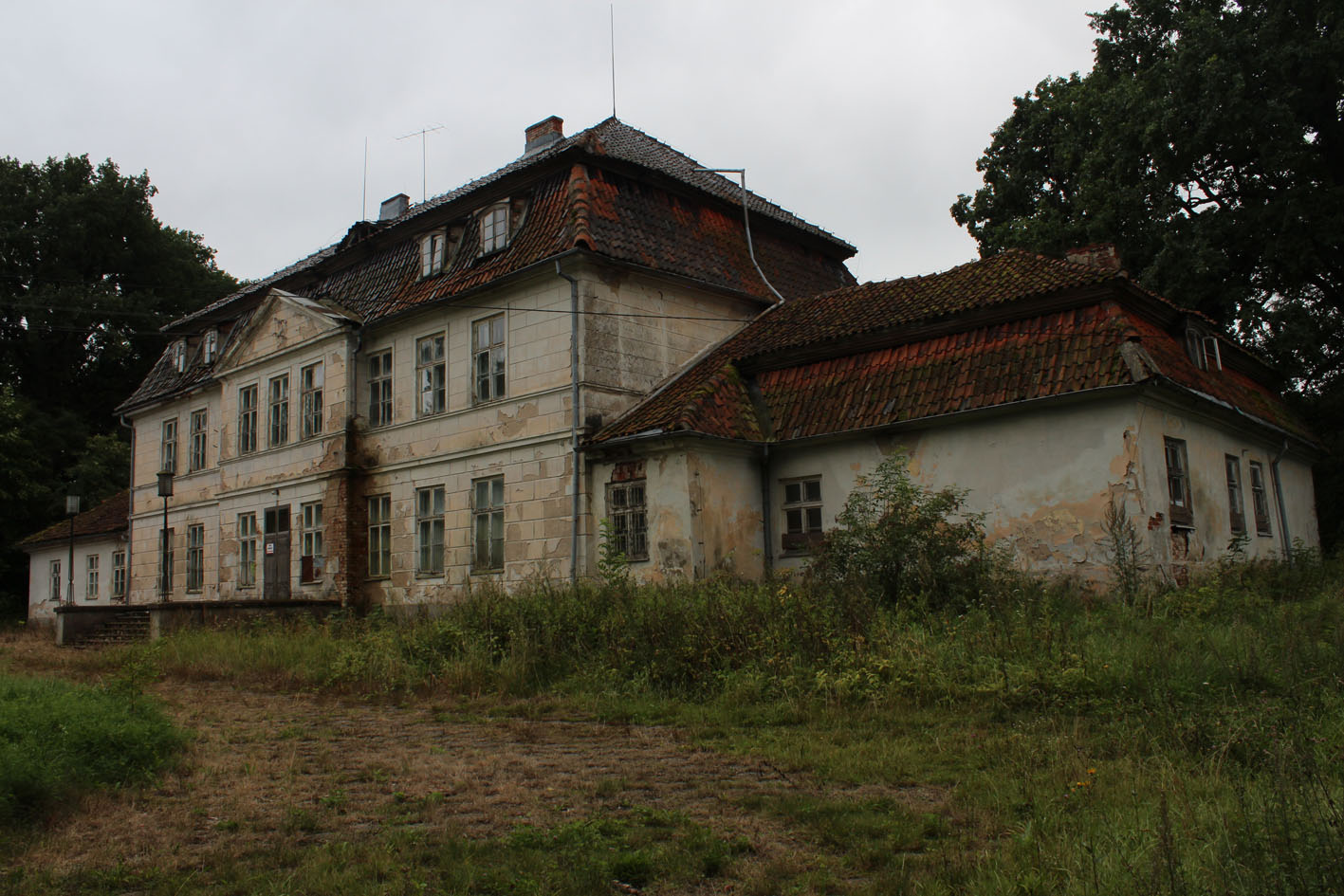
- Palace in Bęsia

- Location within Poland
- Coordinates: 53°56′51″N 20°59′53″E
- Country: Poland
- Voivodeship: Warmian-Masurian
- County: Olsztyn
- Gmina: Kolno
- Population: 731

Bęsia [ˈbɛ̃ɕa] is a village in the administrative district of Gmina Kolno, within Olsztyn County, Warmian-Masurian Voivodeship, in northern Poland.
