= Ustnik, Warmian-Masurian Voivodeship =

Ustnik
- Village
- Location within Poland
- Coordinates: 53°59′30″N 20°41′53″E
- Country: Poland
- Voivodeship: Warmian-Masurian
- County: Olsztyn
- Gmina: Jeziorany
- Population: 60

Ustnik [ˈustnik] is a village in the administrative district of Gmina Jeziorany, within Olsztyn County, Warmian-Masurian Voivodeship, in northern Poland. and is a small town eastern side of poland
