= Gajówka Augustowska =

- Settlement
- Location within Poland
- Coordinates: 53°56′19″N 21°07′18″E
- Country: Poland
- Voivodeship: Warmian-Masurian
- County: Olsztyn
- Gmina: Kolno

Gajówka Augustowska [ɡaˈjufka auɡusˈtɔfska] is a settlement in the administrative district of Gmina Kolno, within Olsztyn County, Warmian-Masurian Voivodeship, in northern Poland.
