= Grzybowo, Kętrzyn County =

Grzybowo
- Settlement
- Location within Poland
- Coordinates: 54°01′55″N 021°35′32″E
- Country: Poland
- Voivodeship: Warmian-Masurian
- County: Kętrzyn
- Gmina: Reszel
- Population: 2

Grzybowo [ɡʐɨˈbɔvɔ] is a settlement in the administrative district of Gmina Reszel, within Kętrzyn County, Warmian-Masurian Voivodeship, in northern Poland.

The settlement is within a Forest Reserve, the Grzybowo Forest.
