= Wysoka Dąbrowa =

- Village
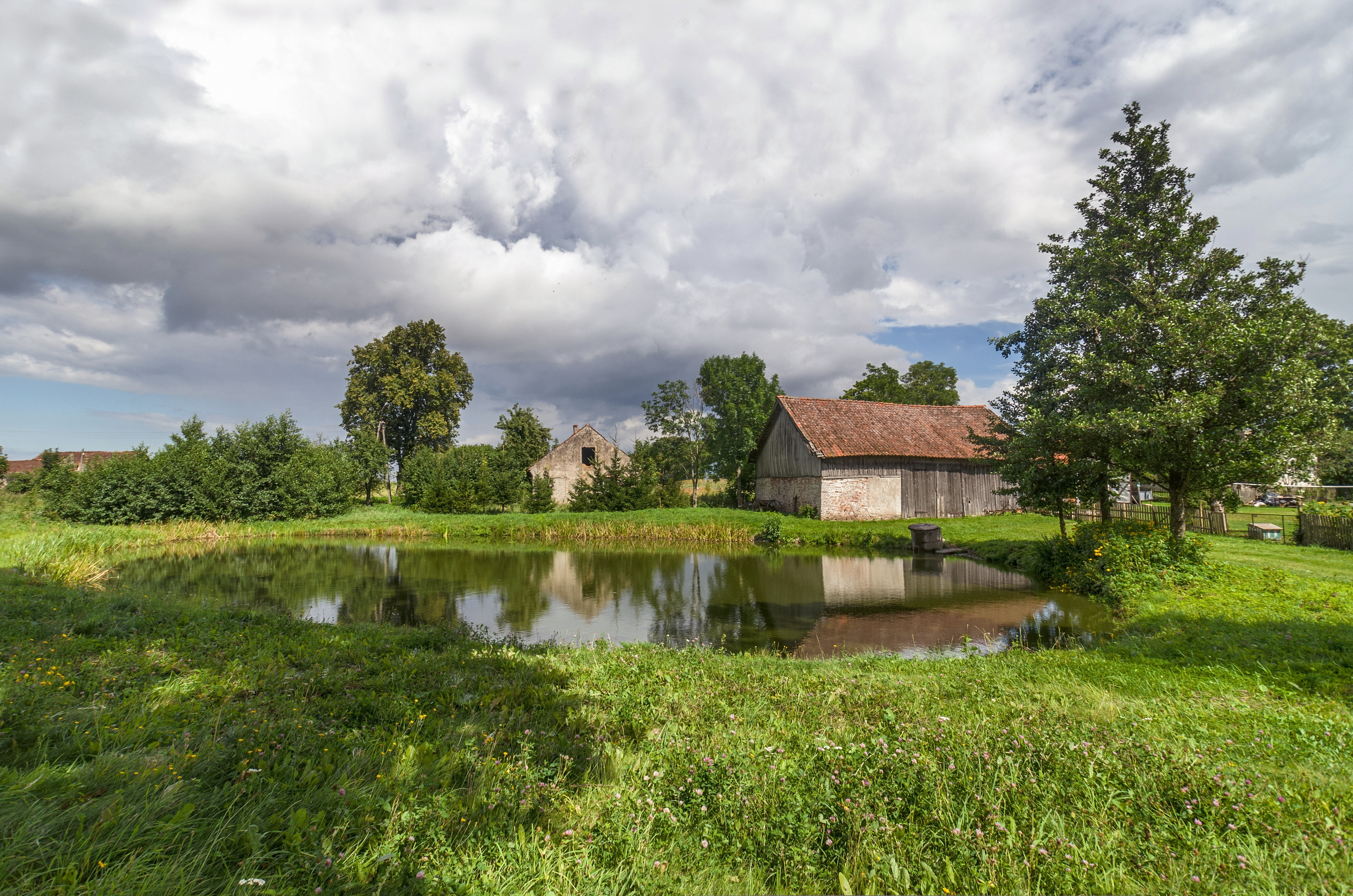

- Location within Poland
- Coordinates: 54°3′N 20°58′E
- Country: Poland
- Voivodeship: Warmian-Masurian
- County: Olsztyn
- Gmina: Kolno

Wysoka Dąbrowa [vɨˈsɔka dɔmˈbrɔva] is a village in the administrative district of Gmina Kolno, within Olsztyn County, Warmian-Masurian Voivodeship, in northern Poland.
