= Kiersztanowo, Olsztyn County =

Kiersztanowo
- Village
- Location within Poland
- Coordinates: 53°55′27″N 20°47′2″E
- Country: Poland
- Voivodeship: Warmian-Masurian
- County: Olsztyn
- Gmina: Jeziorany
- Population (2006): 310

Kiersztanowo [kʲɛrʂtaˈnɔvɔ] is a village in the administrative district of Gmina Jeziorany, within Olsztyn County, Warmian-Masurian Voivodeship, in northern Poland.
