= Krokowo, Olsztyn County =

Krokowo
- Village
- Location within Poland
- Coordinates: 53°56′38″N 20°42′24″E
- Country: Poland
- Voivodeship: Warmian-Masurian
- County: Olsztyn
- Gmina: Jeziorany
- Population: 650

Krokowo [krɔˈkɔvɔ] is a village in the administrative district of Gmina Jeziorany, within Olsztyn County, Warmian-Masurian Voivodeship, in northern Poland.
