= Pudwągi =

- Village
- Location within Poland
- Coordinates: 54°3′41″N 21°16′14″E
- Country: Poland
- Voivodeship: Warmian-Masurian
- County: Kętrzyn
- Gmina: Reszel
- Population: 22

Pudwągi [pudˈvɔnɡi] is a village in the administrative district of Gmina Reszel, within Kętrzyn County, Warmian-Masurian Voivodeship, in northern Poland.
