= Modliny =

- Village
- Location within Poland
- Coordinates: 54°1′N 20°42′E
- Country: Poland
- Voivodeship: Warmian-Masurian
- County: Olsztyn
- Gmina: Jeziorany

Modliny [mɔdˈlinɨ] is a village in the administrative district of Gmina Jeziorany, within Olsztyn County, Warmian-Masurian Voivodeship, in northern Poland.
