= Wólka, Olsztyn County =

Wólka
- Village
- Location within Poland
- Coordinates: 53°56′38″N 21°2′6″E
- Country: Poland
- Voivodeship: Warmian-Masurian
- County: Olsztyn
- Gmina: Kolno
- Population: 40

Wólka [ˈvulka] is a village in the administrative district of Gmina Kolno, within Olsztyn County, Warmian-Masurian Voivodeship, in northern Poland.
