= Wola, Kętrzyn County =

Wola
- Village
- Location within Poland
- Coordinates: 53°56′N 21°7′E
- Country: Poland
- Voivodeship: Warmian-Masurian
- County: Kętrzyn
- Gmina: Reszel
- Population (approx.): 60

Wola [ˈvɔla] is a village in the administrative district of Gmina Reszel, within Kętrzyn County, Warmian-Masurian Voivodeship, in northern Poland.
