= Mojkowo, Kętrzyn County =

Mojkowo
- Village
- Location within Poland
- Coordinates: 54°2′35″N 21°10′54″E
- Country: Poland
- Voivodeship: Warmian-Masurian
- County: Kętrzyn
- Gmina: Reszel
- Population: 33

Mojkowo [mɔi̯ˈkɔvɔ] is a village in the administrative district of Gmina Reszel, within Kętrzyn County, Warmian-Masurian Voivodeship, in northern Poland.
