= Bezławki =

- Village
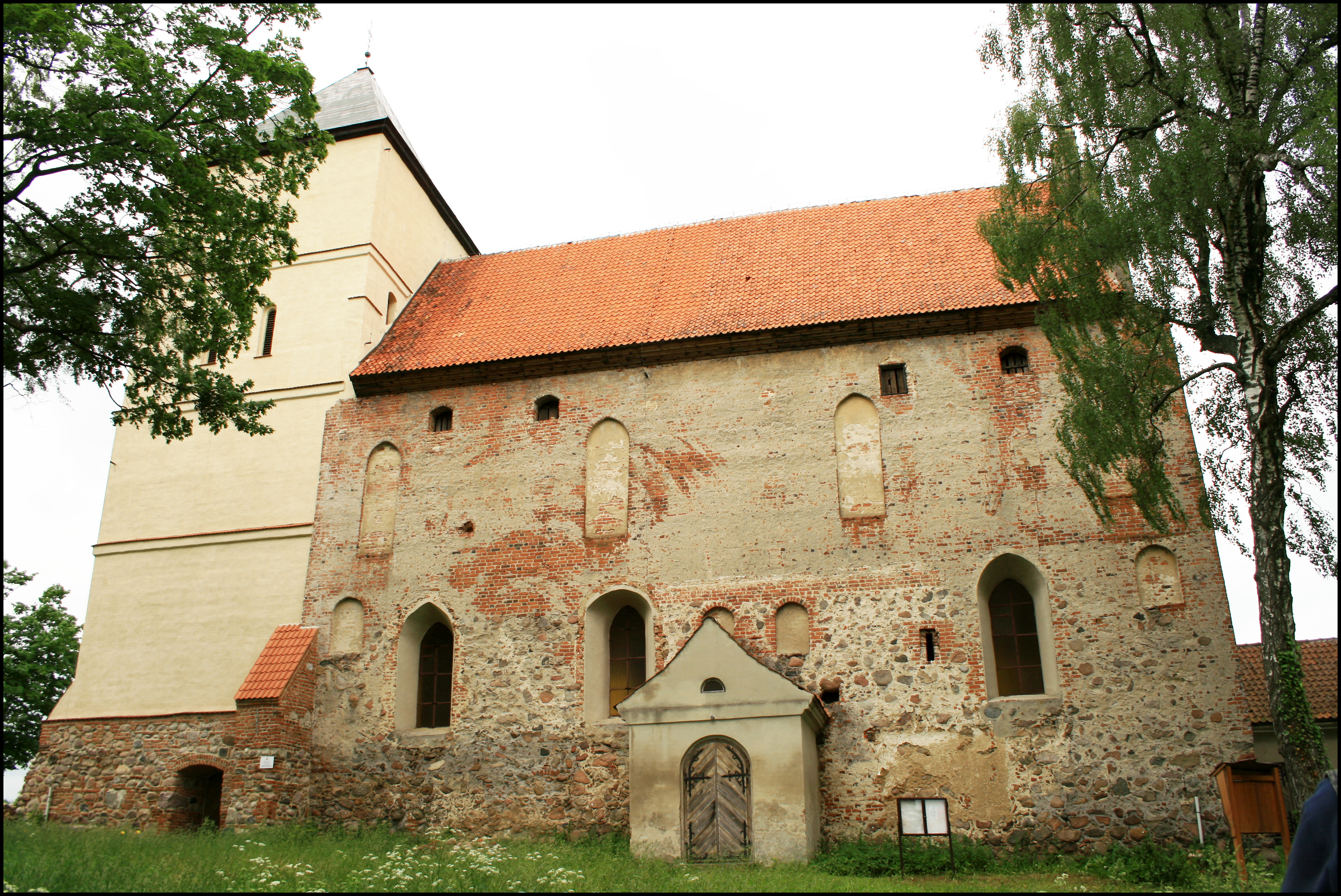
- Church (former castle)

- Location within Poland
- Coordinates: 54°0′52″N 21°16′35″E
- Country: Poland
- Voivodeship: Warmian-Masurian
- County: Kętrzyn
- Gmina: Reszel

Population (2021)
  - Total: 111
- Time zone: UTC+1 (CET)
  - Summer (DST): UTC+2 (CEST)
- Postal code: 11-440
- Vehicle registration: NKE

Bezławki ([bɛˈzwafki]) is a village in the administrative district of Gmina Reszel, within Kętrzyn County, Warmian-Masurian Voivodeship, in northern Poland.

A watermill probably existed in the village already in 1356. The Teutonic Knights built a small Ordensburg or castle at the site in the 14th century, as a defense against Lithuanian raids. The castle, located on a hill and easily accessible only from the north, was in 1583 converted into an Evangelical church. Polish-language services were held in the church. A church tower was built in 1726–28. The interior of the church was completely refurnished in 1884.

== Bibliography ==
- Krahe, Friedrich-Wilhelm (2000). Burgen des deutschen Mittelalters. Grundriss-Lexikon (in German). Flechsig. p. 693. ISBN 3-88189-360-1.
