= Augustówka, Warmian-Masurian Voivodeship =

Augustówka
- Settlement
- Location within Poland
- Coordinates: 53°59′0″N 20°59′33″E
- Country: Poland
- Voivodeship: Warmian-Masurian
- County: Olsztyn
- Gmina: Kolno

Augustówka [auɡusˈtufka] is a settlement in the administrative district of Gmina Kolno, within Olsztyn County, Warmian-Masurian Voivodeship, in northern Poland.
