= Wólka Szlachecka =

- Village
- Location within Poland
- Coordinates: 54°3′32″N 20°44′37″E
- Country: Poland
- Voivodeship: Warmian-Masurian
- County: Olsztyn
- Gmina: Jeziorany

Wólka Szlachecka [ˈvulka ʂlaˈxɛt͡ska] is a village in the administrative district of Gmina Jeziorany, within Olsztyn County, Warmian-Masurian Voivodeship, in northern Poland.
