= Ferdinand Schulz =

German aviator and glider pilot (1892 - 1929)

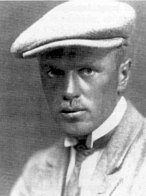
- Schulz Jr. c. 1927
- Born: December 18, 1892; Pissau, Ostpreußen
- Died: June 16, 1929 (aged 36); Stuhm, Ostpreußen
- Burial place: Cemetery of Lidzbark Warmiński
- Occupations: Pilot; Constructor; Athlete
- Children: 3 (all male)
- Parents: Ferdinand Schulz Sr. (father); Rosi Scharnick (mother)
- Relatives: 12

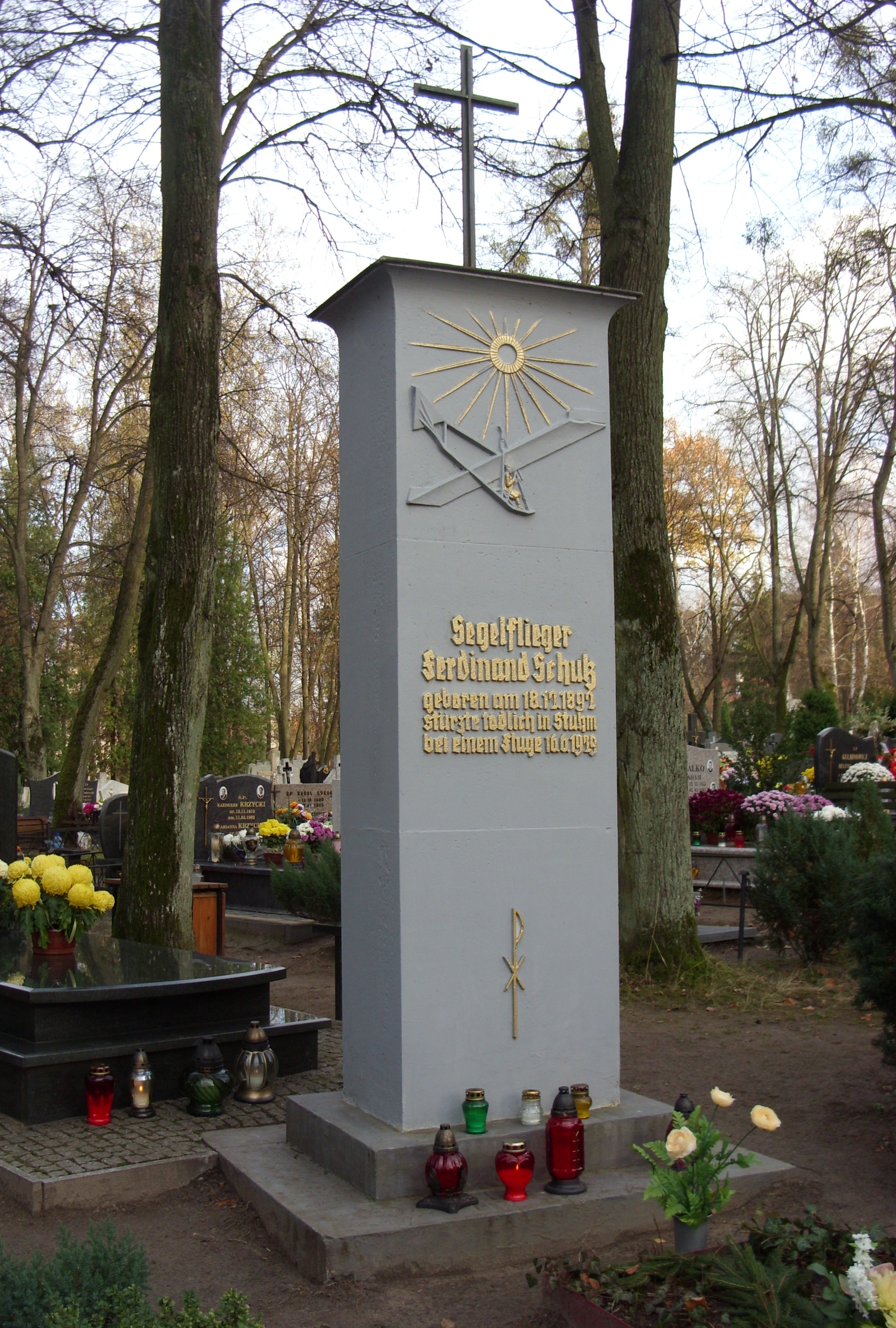
Ferdinand Schulz's gravestone at the cemetery in Lidzbark Warmiński

Ferdinand Schulz Jr. (18 December 1892 – 16 June 1929) was a German aviator and glider pilot who broke a contemporary record by gliding and staying aloft for 14 hours and 7 minutes. He popularized hang-gliding in Germany and was called the "Icarus von Ostpreußen".

== Childhood ==
Schulz was born in Pissau, East Prussia, the eldest child of school teacher Ferdinand and Rosi Scharnick. He studied at a Catholic school in Pissau where his father was the sole teacher. In 1904 he went to Braunsberg, staying with his aunt and attending the grammar school. In 1905 he went to Rössel and in 1911 went to the teacher training college in Thorn.

== World War I ==
In 1914, Ferdinand volunteered for one year to do his military service. On April 1, he was drafted into the 128th Infantry Regiment in Danzig-Langfuhr. He was assigned to the 3rd battalion. Four months later, on August 1, World War I broke out. Shortly after, he was wounded near Tannenberg and this turned out to be the first of his three wounds. Each time he returned to duty, was awarded the Iron Cross 2nd class, with a personal formulation "for bravery in the face of the enemy.". On February 22, 1917, he moved to Schneidemühl. He then attended the Aviation School in Grossenhain, Saxony. On March 9, Schulz first boarded a training aircraft with his instructor. After 46 flights, he was allowed to make his first solo flight. He completed his flight training at the observer school in Schwerin. That same year, Schulz was promoted to the rank of Unterfeldwebel. At the end of 1917, Ferdinand was transferred to the 2nd Army airfield in Aulony on the Western Front. On January 3, 1918, Schulz and 484 other pilots took off on their first flight to the front. In their first flight, they surprised Allied artillery units that were building a camp behind the forest and were fired upon by them. The shells pierced the wings and fuselage. Another German soldier who saw this was wounded and eventually his engine was hit. The engine began to stop working. Then Schulz raised his plane, turned it around and tried to fly to his army, but had to make an emergency landing in a field. He took the shell that had become stuck in his engine and carried it with him as a talisman. He survived war skirmishes 97 more times which after became a squadron commander with the rank of lieutenant, receiving another Iron Cross, this time 1st class.

== Post-war era ==
After the war ended, he returned to Pissau and then began working at a Catholic primary school in Jehlenz. Around this time Schulz began building his first gliders: "FS 1" and "FS 2".

== Flying career ==
From October 10–25, 1921, Schulz tried to participate as a novice in the 2nd Röhn Competition, but his machine was rejected by the competition committee. However, he made eight flights outside the competition from the Pelz slope. In one of them, he covered the 365-metre route in 46 seconds. Schulz was awarded a consolation prize of 1,000 Deutsch Marks for his "daring flight". By 1924, Schulz had built 10 different gliders according to his own designs, including aircraft with an auxiliary engine. Of the gliders constructed in Königsberg, the most famous were the "FS 5", "FS 9", "FS 10" and "FS 3" - known as the Besenstielkiste. It was very simple in its construction. Made of broom handles, strips, sheet metal, wire and canvas, it gave the impression of being very primitive.

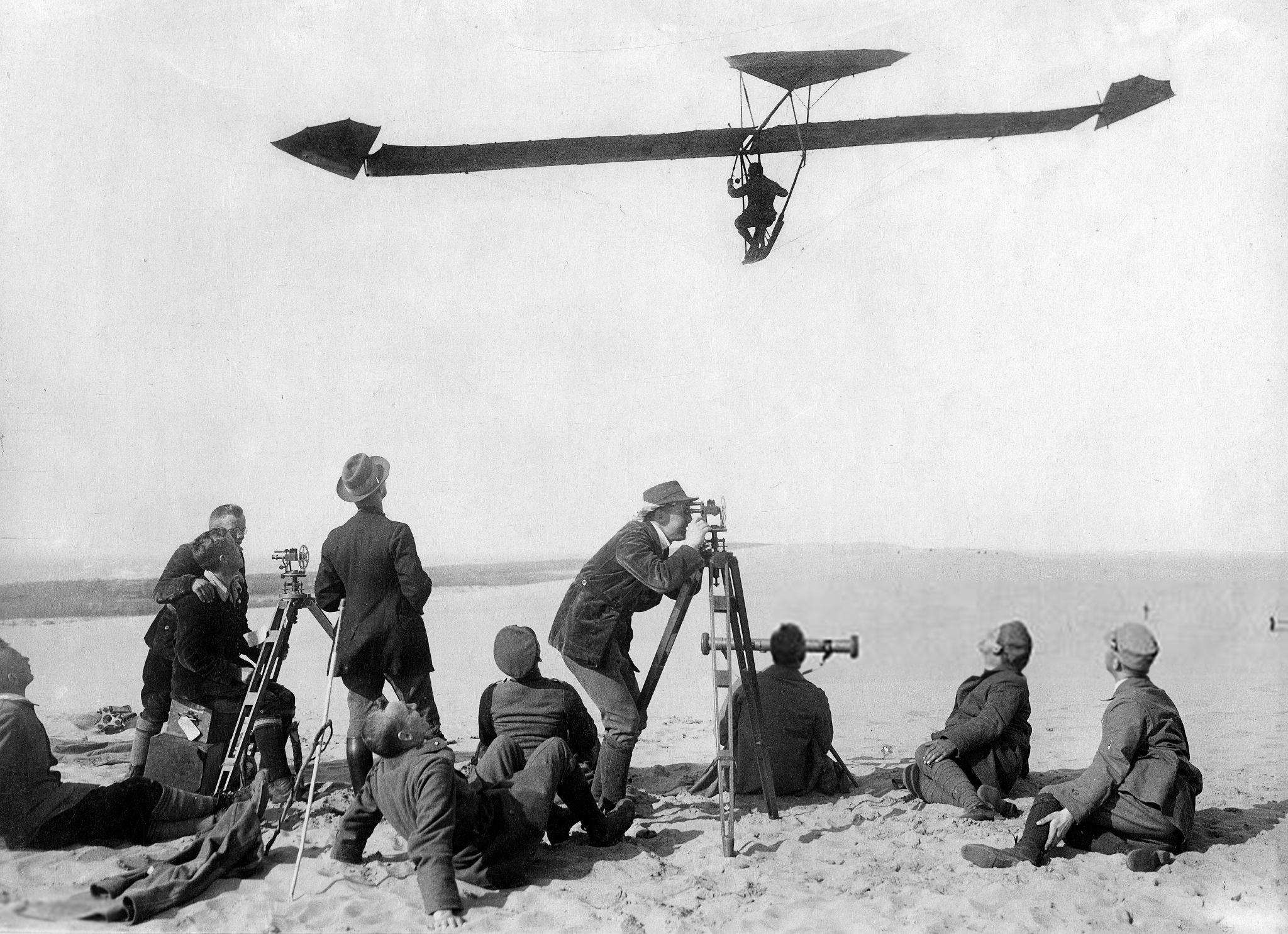
Schulz flying in 1924

On May 11, 1924, during the 2nd Coastal Gliding Competition in Rossitten, Schulz flew the glider "FS 3" for 8 hours and 42 minutes, which was a world record at the time and became a direct impulse for a small group of gliding enthusiasts to establish the Aviation Association in Willenberg near Marienburg. On May 20, 1925, with the support of Schulz himself, the "Westpreußischer Luftfahrt-Verband" was established, with its headquarters in Marienburg.

Schulz's flight school in Rossitten

In autumn of 1925, a group of German pilots was invited to the 3rd All-Russian Gliding Competition, which took place from 1 to 10 October in Crimea. This group also included Ferdinand Schulz, who flew the "Moritz" performance glider. In this glider, on October 2nd Schulz set a new world record in a long-distance flight in Crimea, lasting 12 hours and 6 minutes. Reaching an altitude of 405 m above sea level, he achieved 2nd place in this competition. After returning to Rossitten, he founded the Gliding School. On 3 June 1926, Schulz, together with Heinz Reichardt, spent 9 hours and 21 minutes in the air. It was not until 1937 in Sylt that this record was improved by Ernst Jachtmann and Flossdorf in the "RM 4" glider to 13 hours and 59 minutes.

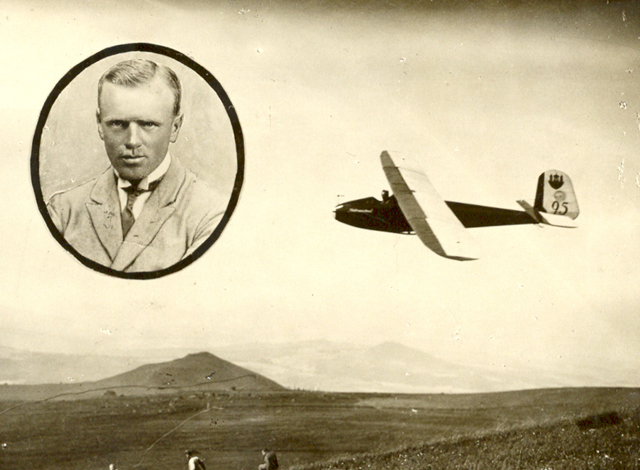
Schulz and his glider, 1927

On January 1, 1927, Schulz was given a job as a teacher at the primary school in Marienburg-Sandhof. He settled in Marienburg at the "Kurfürsten" inn (today Bar Puchatek located in Plac Gdański 7). He could now personally supervise the expansion of the glider airfield in the Willenberg county, as well as continue to actively participate in international competitions. On May 2, 1927, he took part in the 4th Gliding Competition in Rossitten. He took off in the glider "Westpreußen" - belonging to the "Westpreußischer Luftfahrt-Verband" and built in Marienburg in 1926 especially for Schulz. On the first day, he broke another record - he flew for 14 hours and 7 minutes. Two days later he broke further records: the altitude record in a shuttle flight (it was 560 m above sea level) and the speed record, which was 54.45 km/h. On May 14, 1927 he set a new record of 60.2 km/h.

The most interesting flights were made in his home area – in Willenberg. One day in May 1928, a strong north-westerly wind was blowing at a speed of 14 m/sec., which lifted Schulz to a height of 650 m above sea level, he decided to visit Marienburg. The inhabitants of Marienburg looked at him with amazement, when he suddenly appeared over the castle and the city, flying over it at a height of 150 m above sea level. He spent a total of 4 hours and 1 minute in the air over the city.

A month before Schulz's 36th birthday, on November 18, 1928, the residents of Marienburg erected a commemorative stone for their distinguished fellow citizen on the edge of the Marienburg-Willenberg glider airfield. It was a granite block with the inscription: "Segelflieger Ferdinand Schulz - 1928". Two days later, Schulz obtained the qualifications to perform aerial acrobatics.

== Death ==
Wreck of Schulz's plane on the Bismarck Square in Stuhm

On June 16, 1929 Schulz crashed over the city of Stuhm along with Bruno Kaiser, while taking part in the ceremonial opening of a monument to those who fell in World War I. The pilots were supposed to fly the Marienburg motor plane over the city and drop a memorial wreath on Bismarck Square when the plane's wing strut broke and crashed into the cobblestones of the city. He is buried in Lidzbark Warmiński (Heilsberg). A monument was also erected in Nida, Lithuania in 1998.

On June 16, 2006, on the anniversary of Schulz's tragic death, a commemorative plaque was unveiled and placed in Malbork on the wall of the pilot's former home.

The Stuhm District Newspaper reporting the death of Ferdinand Schulz and Bruno Kaiser, June 18th 1929
