= Żardeniki, Gmina Jeziorany =

Żardeniki
- Village
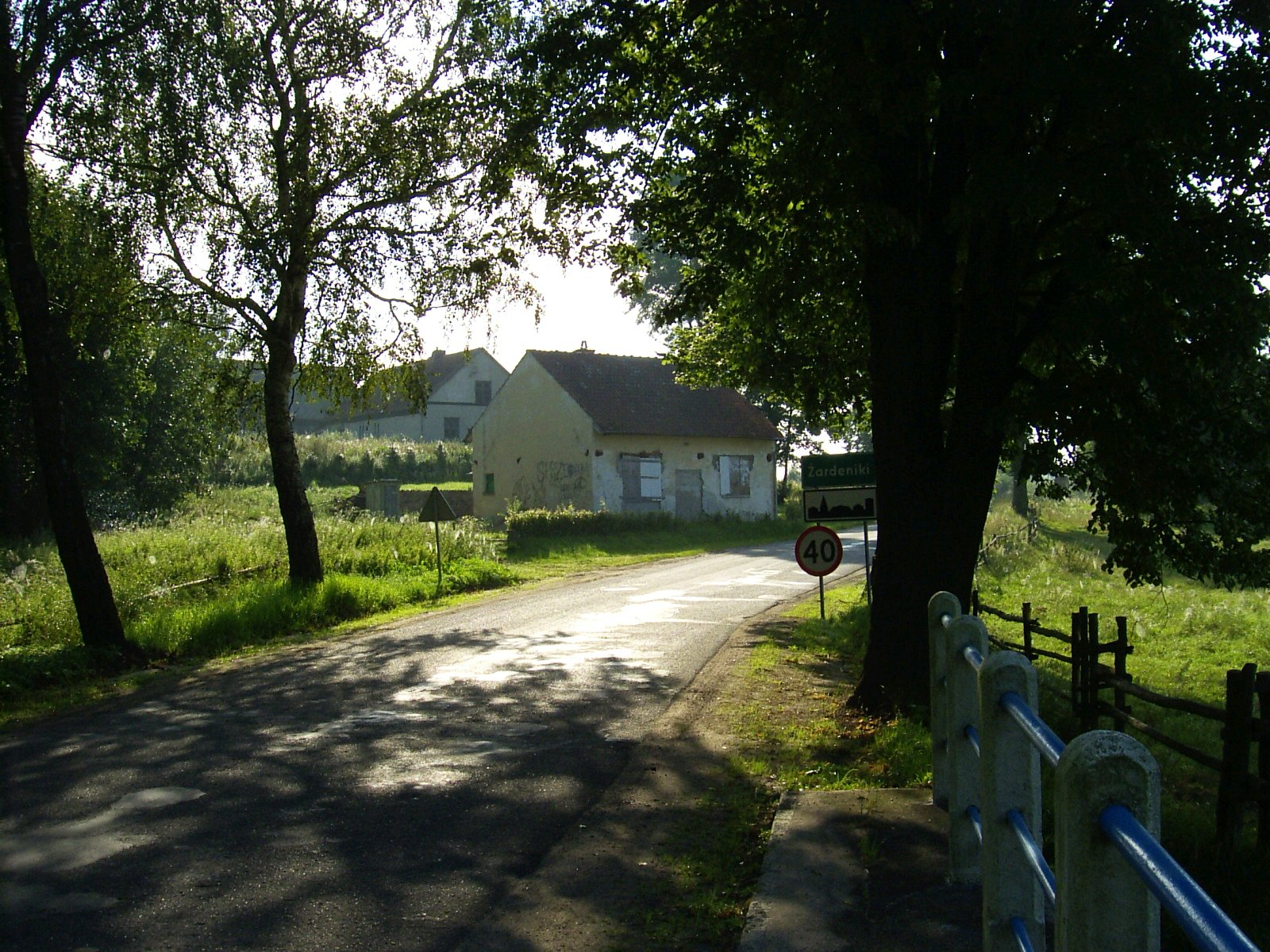

- Location within Poland
- Coordinates: 53°58′36″N 20°48′21″E
- Country: Poland
- Voivodeship: Warmian-Masurian
- County: Olsztyn
- Gmina: Jeziorany
- Population (approx.): 170

Żardeniki [ʐardɛˈniki] is a village in the administrative district of Gmina Jeziorany, within Olsztyn County, Warmian-Masurian Voivodeship, in northern Poland.

Before 1772 the area was part of Kingdom of Poland, and in 1772–1945 it belonged to Prussia and Germany (East Prussia).

== History ==
1306 is the founding year of Scharnigk: On July 29 of that year, Bishop Eberhard of Neisse of Warmia granted Dietrich Luningenberg land in the Schardenitten field. In 1785, Scharnigk was mentioned as a royal farming village with 22 hearths, and in 1820, it was again recorded with 30 hearths and 173 inhabitants.

In 1874, Scharnigk became part of the newly formed Elsau (Polish: Olszewnik) district in the East Prussian Rößel district and remained so until 1945.
