= Grodzki Młyn =

- Village
- Location within Poland
- Coordinates: 54°2′28″N 21°7′31″E
- Country: Poland
- Voivodeship: Warmian-Masurian
- County: Kętrzyn
- Gmina: Reszel
- Population: 40

Grodzki Młyn [ˈɡrɔt͡ski ˈmwɨn] is a village in the administrative district of Gmina Reszel, within Kętrzyn County, Warmian-Masurian Voivodeship, in northern Poland.
