= Kalis, Poland =

Kalis
- Settlement
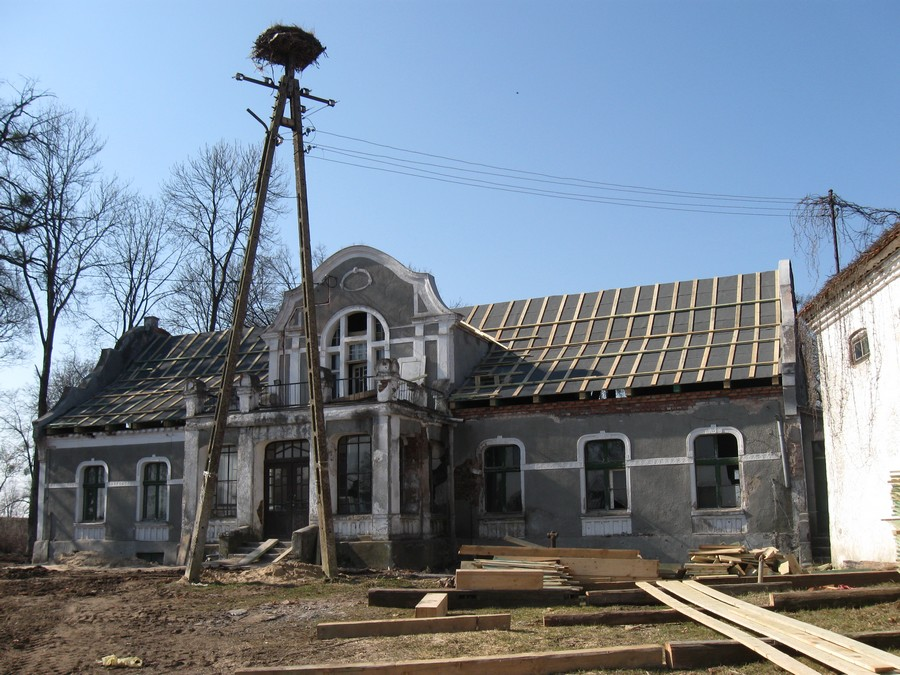
- Dwór in Kalis

- Location within Poland
- Coordinates: 53°58′N 20°41′E
- Country: Poland
- Voivodeship: Warmian-Masurian
- County: Olsztyn
- Gmina: Jeziorany
- Population (2006): 80

Kalis [ˈkalis] is a settlement in the administrative district of Gmina Jeziorany, within Olsztyn County, Warmian-Masurian Voivodeship, in northern Poland.
