= Potryty =

- Village
- Location within Poland
- Coordinates: 54°0′3″N 20°39′21″E
- Country: Poland
- Voivodeship: Warmian-Masurian
- County: Olsztyn
- Gmina: Jeziorany
- Population: 200

Potryty [pɔˈtrɨtɨ] is a village in the administrative district of Gmina Jeziorany, within Olsztyn County, Warmian-Masurian Voivodeship, in northern Poland.
