= Niewodnica, Warmian-Masurian Voivodeship =

Niewodnica
- Settlement
- Location within Poland
- Coordinates: 54°0′29″N 21°14′9″E
- Country: Poland
- Voivodeship: Warmian-Masurian
- County: Kętrzyn
- Gmina: Reszel

Niewodnica [ɲɛvɔˈdɲit͡sa] is a settlement in the administrative district of Gmina Reszel, within Kętrzyn County, Warmian-Masurian Voivodeship, in northern Poland.
