= Pierwągi =

- Village
- Location within Poland
- Coordinates: 54°2′N 20°50′E
- Country: Poland
- Voivodeship: Warmian-Masurian
- County: Olsztyn
- Gmina: Jeziorany

Pierwągi [pjɛrˈvɔnɡi] is a village in the administrative district of Gmina Jeziorany, within Olsztyn County, Warmian-Masurian Voivodeship, in northern Poland.
