= Jeziorany-Kolonie =

- Village
- Location within Poland
- Coordinates: 53°57′0.72″N 20°44′30.08″E
- Country: Poland
- Voivodeship: Warmian-Masurian
- County: Olsztyn
- Gmina: Jeziorany

Jeziorany-Kolonie [jɛʑɔˈranɨ kɔˈlɔɲɛ] is a village in the administrative district of Gmina Jeziorany, within Olsztyn County, Warmian-Masurian Voivodeship, in northern Poland.
