= Bocianowo =

- Village
- Location within Poland
- Coordinates: 53°57′18″N 21°1′19″E
- Country: Poland
- Voivodeship: Warmian-Masurian
- County: Olsztyn
- Gmina: Kolno
- Population: 20

Bocianowo [bɔt͡ɕaˈnɔvɔ] is a village in the administrative district of Gmina Kolno, within Olsztyn County, Warmian-Masurian Voivodeship, in northern Poland.
