= Lipowa Góra, Kętrzyn County =

Lipowa Góra
- Village
- Location within Poland
- Coordinates: 54°2′7″N 21°9′48″E
- Country: Poland
- Voivodeship: Warmian-Masurian
- County: Kętrzyn
- Gmina: Reszel
- Population: 23

Lipowa Góra [liˈpɔva ˈɡura] is a village in the administrative district of Gmina Reszel, within Kętrzyn County, Warmian-Masurian Voivodeship, in northern Poland.
