= Widryny =

- Village
- Location within Poland
- Coordinates: 53°58′N 21°11′E
- Country: Poland
- Voivodeship: Warmian-Masurian
- County: Kętrzyn
- Gmina: Reszel

Widryny [viˈdrɨnɨ] is a village in the administrative district of Gmina Reszel, within Kętrzyn County, Warmian-Masurian Voivodeship, in northern Poland.
