= Łabędziewo =

- Settlement
- Location within Poland
- Coordinates: 53°59′8″N 21°10′40″E
- Country: Poland
- Voivodeship: Warmian-Masurian
- County: Kętrzyn
- Gmina: Reszel
- Population: 10

Łabędziewo [wabɛnˈd͡ʑɛvɔ] is a settlement in the administrative district of Gmina Reszel, within Kętrzyn County, Warmian-Masurian Voivodeship, in northern Poland.
