= Wójtowo, Gmina Kolno =

Wójtowo
- Village
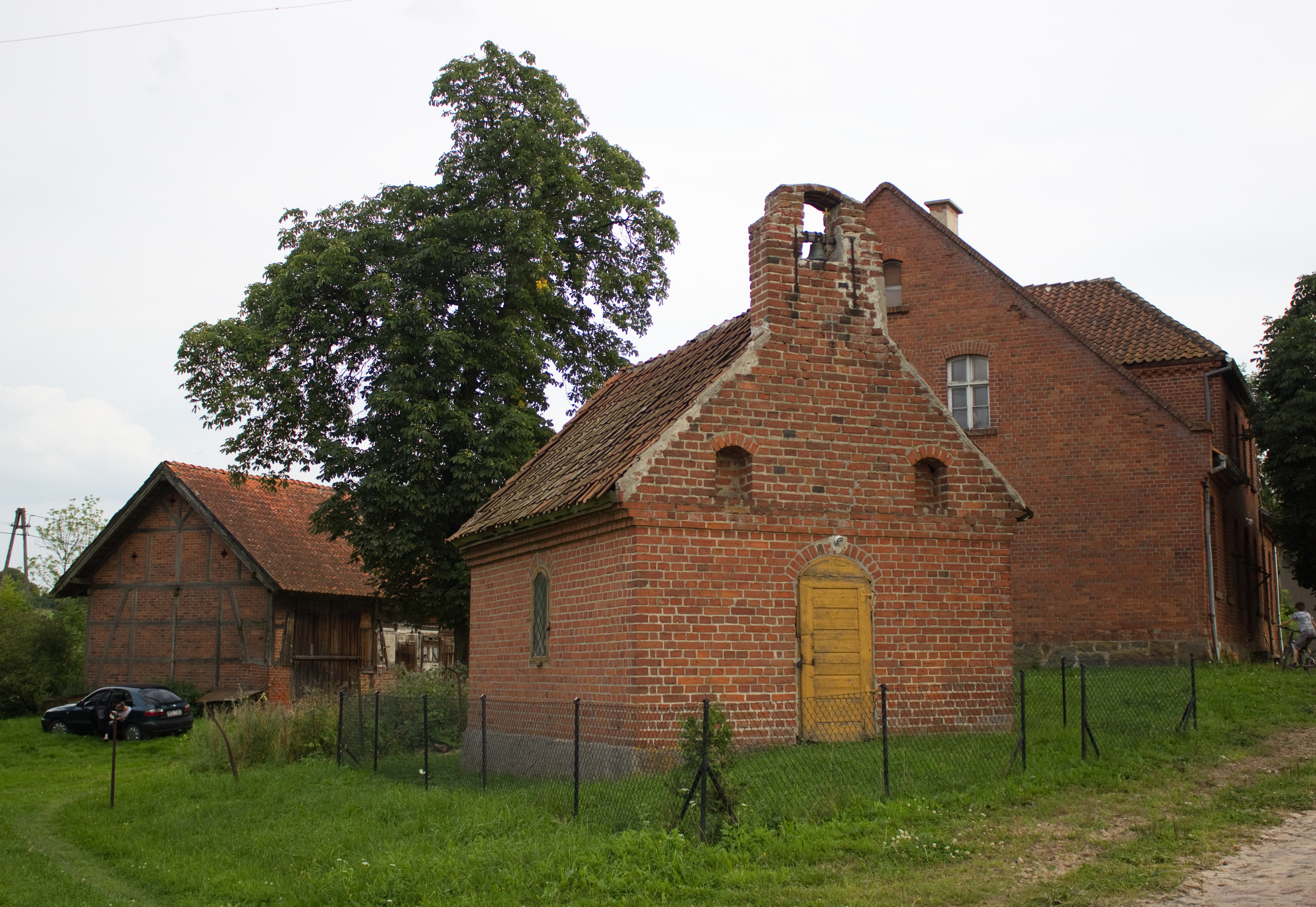

- Location within Poland
- Coordinates: 54°00′24″N 20°56′47″E
- Country: Poland
- Voivodeship: Warmian-Masurian
- County: Olsztyn
- Gmina: Kolno

Wójtowo [vui̯ˈtɔvɔ] is a village in the administrative district of Gmina Kolno, within Olsztyn County, Warmian-Masurian Voivodeship, in northern Poland.

Before 1772 the area was part of Kingdom of Poland, and in 1772–1945 it belonged to Prussia and Germany (East Prussia).
