= Kominki =

- Village
- Location within Poland
- Coordinates: 54°2′N 21°5′E
- Country: Poland
- Voivodeship: Warmian-Masurian
- County: Olsztyn
- Gmina: Kolno

Kominki [kɔˈminki] is a village in the administrative district of Gmina Kolno, within Olsztyn County, Warmian-Masurian Voivodeship, in northern Poland.
