= Tarniny =

- Village
- Location within Poland
- Coordinates: 54°3′N 21°3′E
- Country: Poland
- Voivodeship: Warmian-Masurian
- County: Olsztyn
- Gmina: Kolno

Tarniny [tarˈninɨ] is a village in the administrative district of Gmina Kolno, within Olsztyn County, Warmian-Masurian Voivodeship, in northern Poland.
