= Sątoczno, Pomeranian Voivodeship =

Sątoczno
- Village
- Location within Poland
- Coordinates: 53°59′42″N 17°30′10″E
- Country: Poland
- Voivodeship: Pomeranian
- County: Bytów
- Gmina: Lipnica
- Population: 36

Sątoczno [sɔnˈtɔt͡ʂnɔ] is a village in the administrative district of Gmina Lipnica, within Bytów County, Pomeranian Voivodeship, in northern Poland.

For details of the history of the region, see History of Pomerania.
