= Leginy, Kętrzyn County =

Leginy
- Village
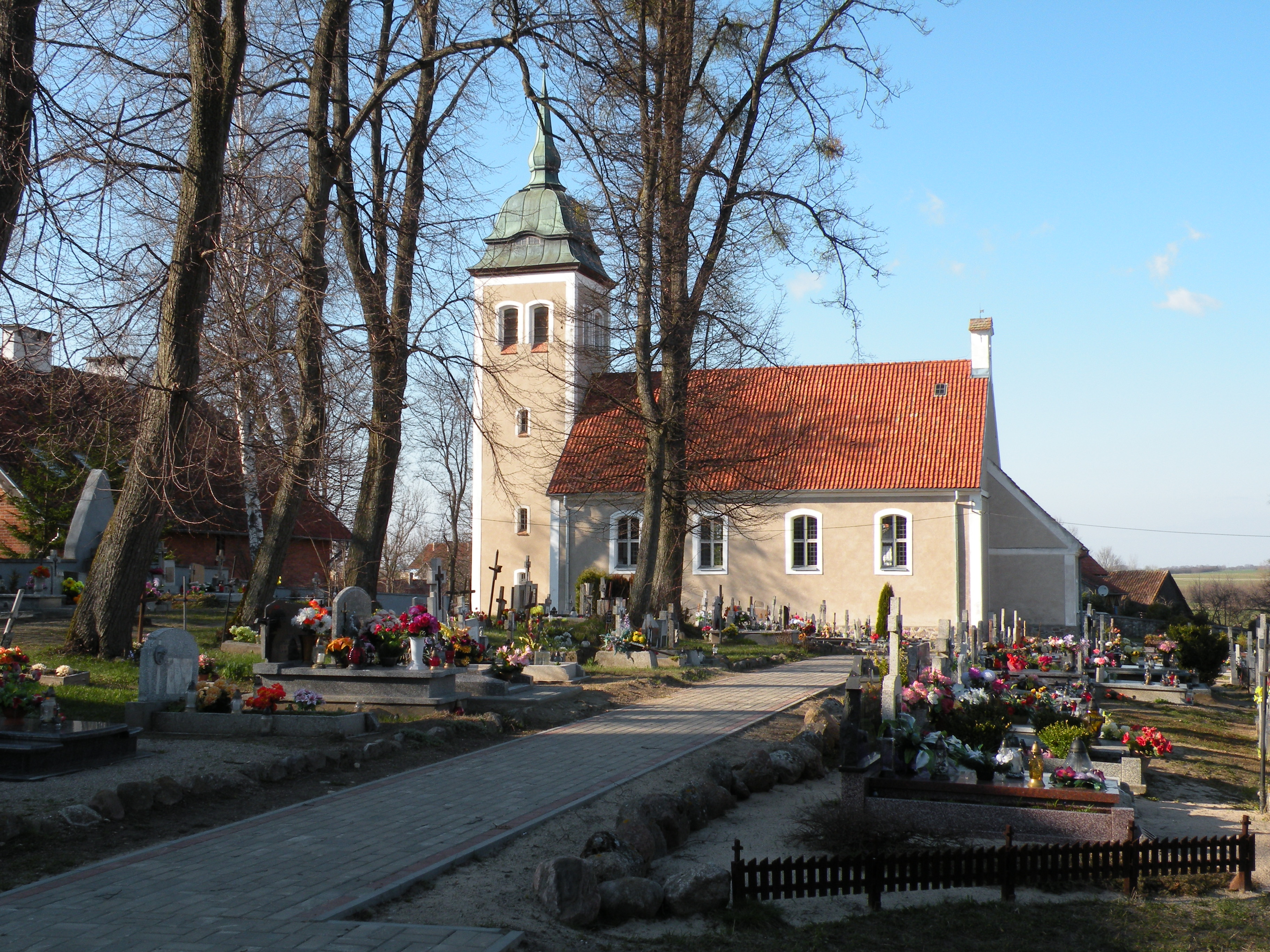
- Church of Saint Mary Magdalene

- Location within Poland
- Coordinates: 54°0′N 21°9′E
- Country: Poland
- Voivodeship: Warmian-Masurian
- County: Kętrzyn
- Gmina: Reszel

Leginy [lɛˈɡinɨ] is a village in the administrative district of Gmina Reszel, within Kętrzyn County, Warmian-Masurian Voivodeship, in northern Poland.
