= Robawy =

- Village
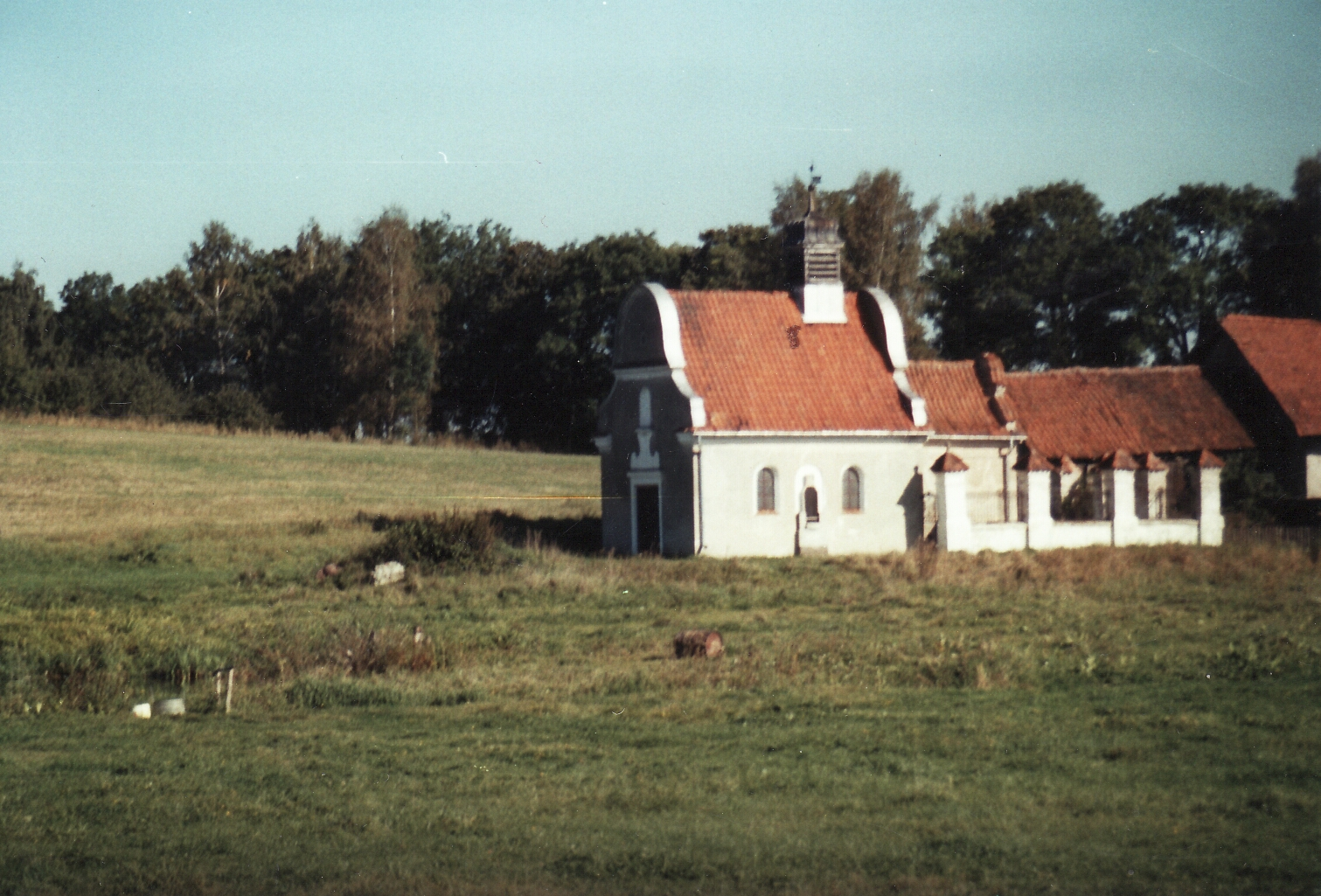

- Location within Poland
- Coordinates: 54°2′29″N 21°9′37″E
- Country: Poland
- Voivodeship: Warmian-Masurian
- County: Kętrzyn
- Gmina: Reszel
- Population (2021): 130

Robawy [rɔˈbavɨ] is a village in the administrative district of Gmina Reszel, within Kętrzyn County, Warmian-Masurian Voivodeship, in northern Poland.
