= Tolniki Małe =

- Village
- Location within Poland
- Coordinates: 54°05′06″N 21°05′29″E
- Country: Poland
- Voivodeship: Warmian-Masurian
- County: Kętrzyn
- Gmina: Reszel

Tolniki Małe [tɔlˈniki ˈmawɛ] is a village in the administrative district of Gmina Reszel, within Kętrzyn County, Warmian-Masurian Voivodeship, in northern Poland.
