= Mnichowo, Warmian-Masurian Voivodeship =

Mnichowo
- Village
- Location within Poland
- Coordinates: 54°2′6″N 21°7′38″E
- Country: Poland
- Voivodeship: Warmian-Masurian
- County: Kętrzyn
- Gmina: Reszel
- Population (2021): 144

Mnichowo [mniˈxɔvɔ] is a village in the administrative district of Gmina Reszel, within Kętrzyn County, Warmian-Masurian Voivodeship, in northern Poland.
