= Klewno, Warmian-Masurian Voivodeship =

Klewno
- Village
- Location within Poland
- Coordinates: 54°3′N 21°10′E
- Country: Poland
- Voivodeship: Warmian-Masurian
- County: Kętrzyn
- Gmina: Reszel
- Elevation: 130 m (430 ft)

Klewno [ˈklɛvnɔ] is a village in the administrative district of Gmina Reszel, within Kętrzyn County, Warmian-Masurian Voivodeship, in northern Poland.
