= Łężany, Warmian-Masurian Voivodeship =

Łężany
- Village
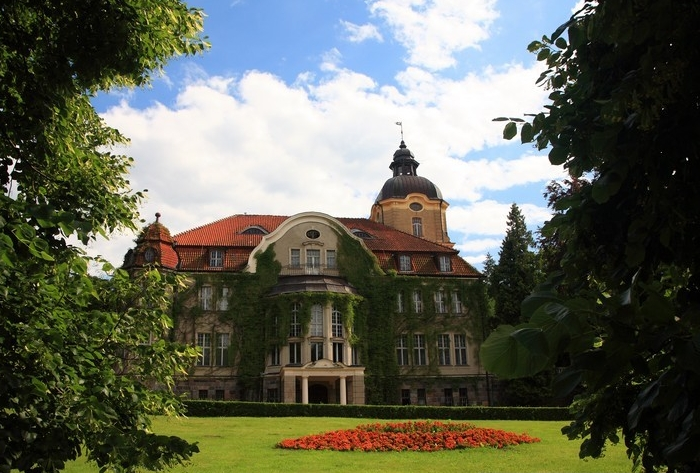
- Manor House

- Location within Poland
- Coordinates: 53°58′0″N 21°8′27″E
- Country: Poland
- Voivodeship: Warmian-Masurian
- County: Kętrzyn
- Gmina: Reszel
- Population: 410

Łężany [wɛ̃ˈʐanɨ] is a village in the administrative district of Gmina Reszel, within Kętrzyn County, Warmian-Masurian Voivodeship, in northern Poland.

The village was founded in 1359. Between the end of the 13th century and the 15th, the village lay in the territory of the Teutonic Knights. From 1466 until the First Partition of Poland, like all of Warmia, it was part of the Kingdom of Poland (initially as part of the province of Royal Prussia). In 1772, the village became part of the Kingdom of Prussia and later the German Empire. After World War II, the local populace was expelled and the area became part of Poland.

== Notable residents ==
- Reinhold von Fischer (1870–1940), German admiral
- Fabian von Lossainen (Fabian Luzjański) (1470–1523), bishop of Warmia
