= Gmina Kolno, Warmian-Masurian Voivodeship =

Gmina Kolno Kolno Commune
- Gmina
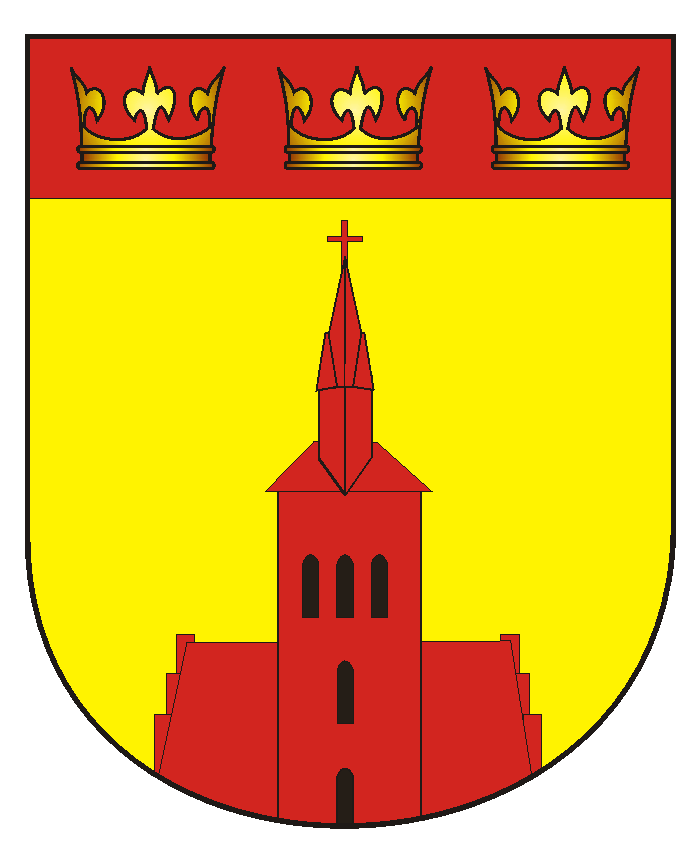
- Coat of arms

- Location within Warmian-Masurian Voivodeship Location within Poland
- Coordinates (Kolno): 53°59′49″N 20°59′43″E
- Country: Poland
- Voivodeship: Warmian-Masurian
- County: Olsztyn County
- Seat: Kolno

Area
  - Total: 178.34 km^{2} (68.86 sq mi)

Population (2006)
  - Total: 3,442
  - Density: 19.30/km^{2} (49.99/sq mi)
- Time zone: UTC+1 (CET)
  - Summer (DST): UTC+2 (CEST)
- Vehicle registration: NOL
- Website: http://bip-kolno.sprint.com.pl/

Gmina Kolno is a rural gmina (administrative district) in Olsztyn County, Warmian-Masurian Voivodeship, in northern Poland. Its seat is the village of Kolno, which lies approximately 41 kilometres (25 mi) north-east of the regional capital Olsztyn.

The gmina covers an area of 178.34 square kilometres (68.9 sq mi), and as of 2006 its total population is 3,442.

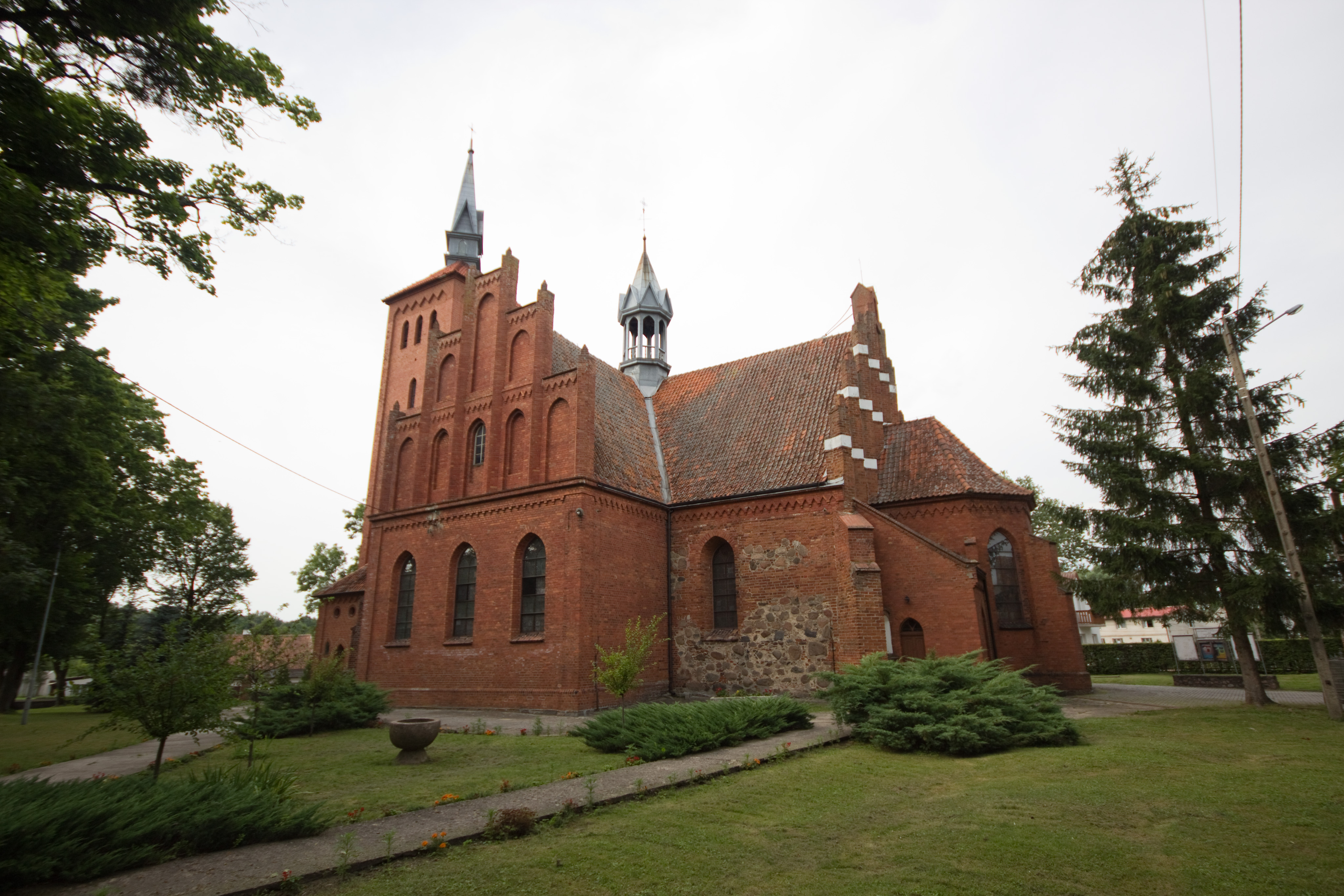
Church of the Epiphany in Kolno

== Villages ==
Gmina Kolno contains the villages and settlements of Augustówka, Bęsia, Bocianowo, Gajówka Augustowska, Górkowo, Górowo, Kabiny, Kolenko, Kolno, Kominki, Kruzy, Lutry, Oterki, Otry, Ryn Reszelski, Samławki, Tarniny, Tejstymy, Wągsty, Wójtowo, Wólka and Wysoka Dąbrowa.

== Neighbouring gminas ==
Gmina Kolno is bordered by the gminas of Biskupiec, Bisztynek, Jeziorany, Reszel and Sorkwity.
