= Rivka Guber =

Israeli social worker and pioneer

- רבקה גובר
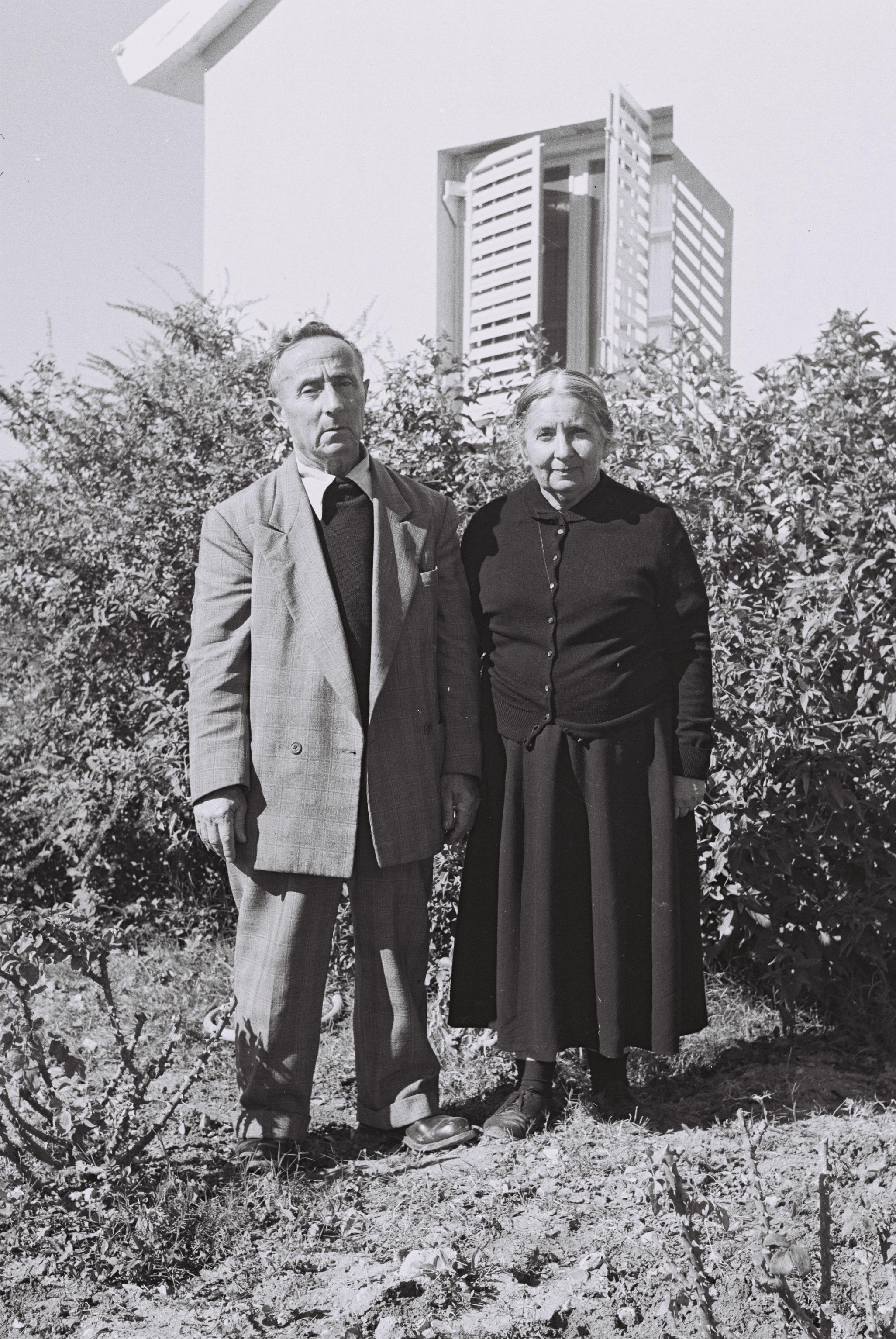
- Rivka Guber and her husband Mordechai, 1959.
- Born: 1902
- Died: 1981 (aged 78–79)
- Occupations: Social worker, pioneer
- Known for: Work in education and immigrant absorption
- Honors: Israel Prize (1976); Commemorative stamp by Israel Postal Authority (1992)

Rivka Guber (Hebrew: רבקה גובר; 1902–1981) was an Israeli social worker and pioneer, and a recipient of the Israel Prize.

== Awards and honors ==
- In 1976, Guber was awarded the Israel Prize, for her special contribution to society and the State of Israel, for her life's work in education and immigrant absorption.
- In 1992, the Israel Postal Authority issued a stamp in Guber's honor, bearing three portraits of her.

== Published works ==
- The Brothers, 1950
- The Signal Fires of Lachish, 1961
- Lakhish: A Literary-Historical Anthology, 1965
- Only a Path, 1970
- These Are the Legends of Kfar Ahim, 1974
- The Tradition to Bequeath, 1979

== See also ==
- List of Israel Prize recipients
