= Piszewo =

- Village
- Location within Poland
- Coordinates: 53°59′N 20°50′E
- Country: Poland
- Voivodeship: Warmian-Masurian
- County: Olsztyn
- Gmina: Jeziorany

Piszewo [piˈʂɛvɔ] is a village in the administrative district of Gmina Jeziorany, within Olsztyn County, Warmian-Masurian Voivodeship, in northern Poland.

== Notable people ==
- Ferdinand Schulz
