= Gmina Reszel =

Gmina Reszel Reszel Commune
- Gmina
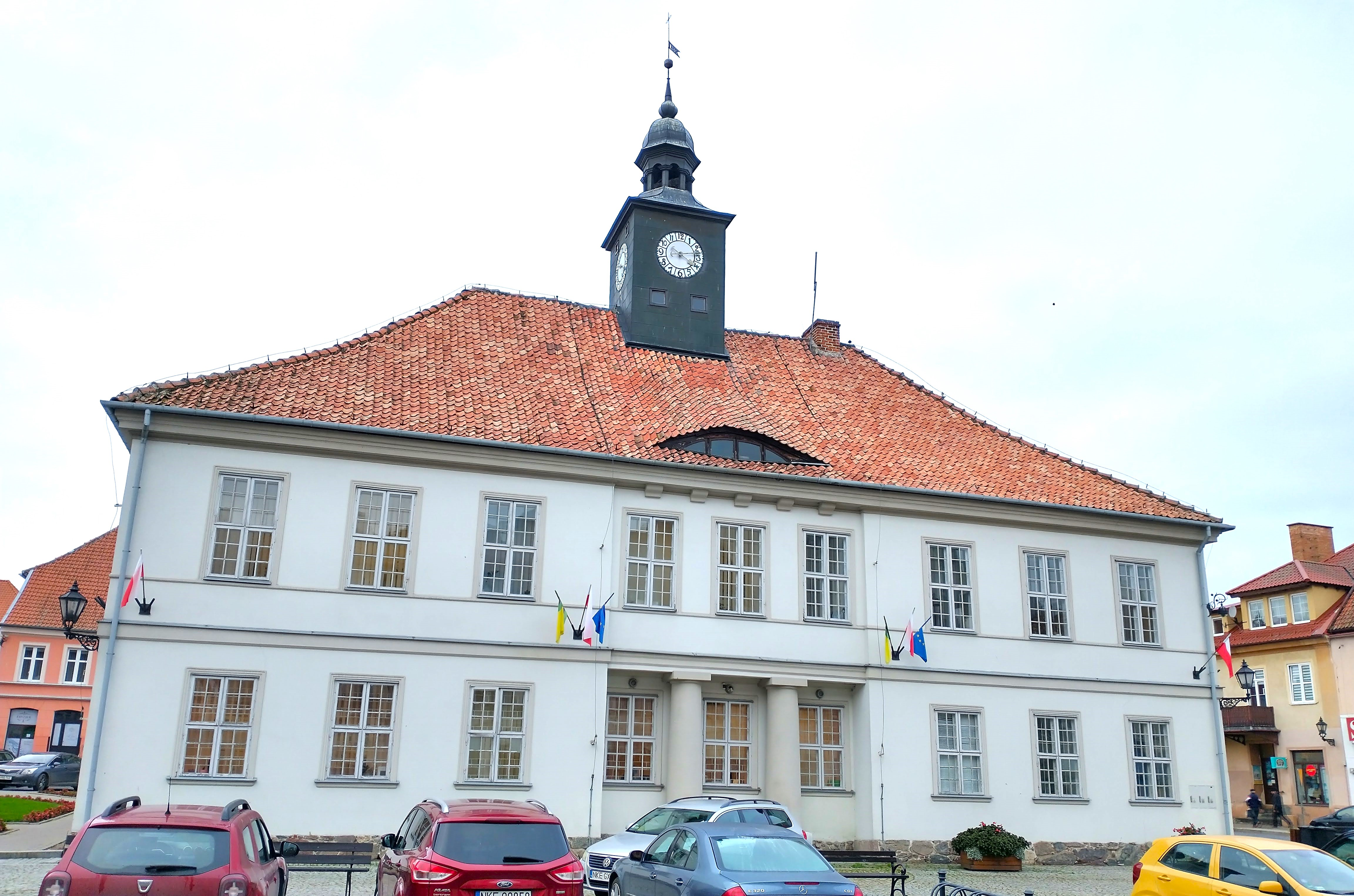
- Town Hall in Reszel, seat of the gmina office

- Flag Coat of arms
- Interactive map of Gmina Reszel
- Coordinates (Reszel): 54°3′8″N 21°8′41″E
- Country: Poland
- Voivodeship: Warmian-Masurian
- County: Kętrzyn
- Seat: Reszel

Area
  - Total: 178.71 km^{2} (69.00 sq mi)

Population (2006)
  - Total: 8,335
  - Density: 46.64/km^{2} (120.8/sq mi)
  - Urban: 5,098
  - Rural: 3,237
- Time zone: UTC+1 (CET)
  - Summer (DST): UTC+2 (CEST)
- Vehicle registration: NKE
- Website: http://www.reszel.iap.pl/

Gmina Reszel is an urban-rural gmina (administrative district) in Kętrzyn County, Warmian-Masurian Voivodeship, in northern Poland. It is seated in the town of Reszel. Reszel is approximately 16 kilometres (10 mi) west of Kętrzyn and 52 km (32 mi) north-east of the regional capital Olsztyn.

The gmina covers an area of 178.71 square kilometres (69.0 sq mi). As of 2006 its total population is 8,335 (out of which the population of Reszel amounts to 5,098, and the population of the rural part of the gmina is 3,237).

== Villages ==
Apart from the town of Reszel, Gmina Reszel contains the villages and settlements of Bertyny, Bezławecki Dwór, Bezławki, Biel, Czarnowiec, Dębnik, Grodzki Młyn, Grzybowo, Kępa Tolnicka, Klewno, Kocibórz, Łabędziewo, Leginy, Łężany, Lipowa Góra, Mała Bertynówka, Mnichowo, Mojkowo, Niewodnica, Pasterzewo, Pieckowo, Pilec, Plenowo, Pudwągi, Ramty, Robawy, Siemki, Śpigiel, Śpiglówka, Staniewo, Stąpławki, Święta Lipka, Tolniki Małe, Wanguty, Widryny, Wola, Wólka Pilecka, Wólka Ryńska, Worpławki and Zawidy.

== Neighbouring gminas ==
Gmina Reszel is bordered by the town of Mrągowo and by the gminas of Bisztynek, Kętrzyn, Kolno, Korsze, Mrągowo and Sorkwity.
