= Zawidy =

- Village
- Location within Poland
- Coordinates: 54°2′N 21°7′E
- Country: Poland
- Voivodeship: Warmian-Masurian
- County: Kętrzyn
- Gmina: Reszel

Zawidy [zaˈvidɨ] is a village in the administrative district of Gmina Reszel, within Kętrzyn County, Warmian-Masurian Voivodeship, in northern Poland.
