= Kolno, Warmian-Masurian Voivodeship =

Kolno
- Village
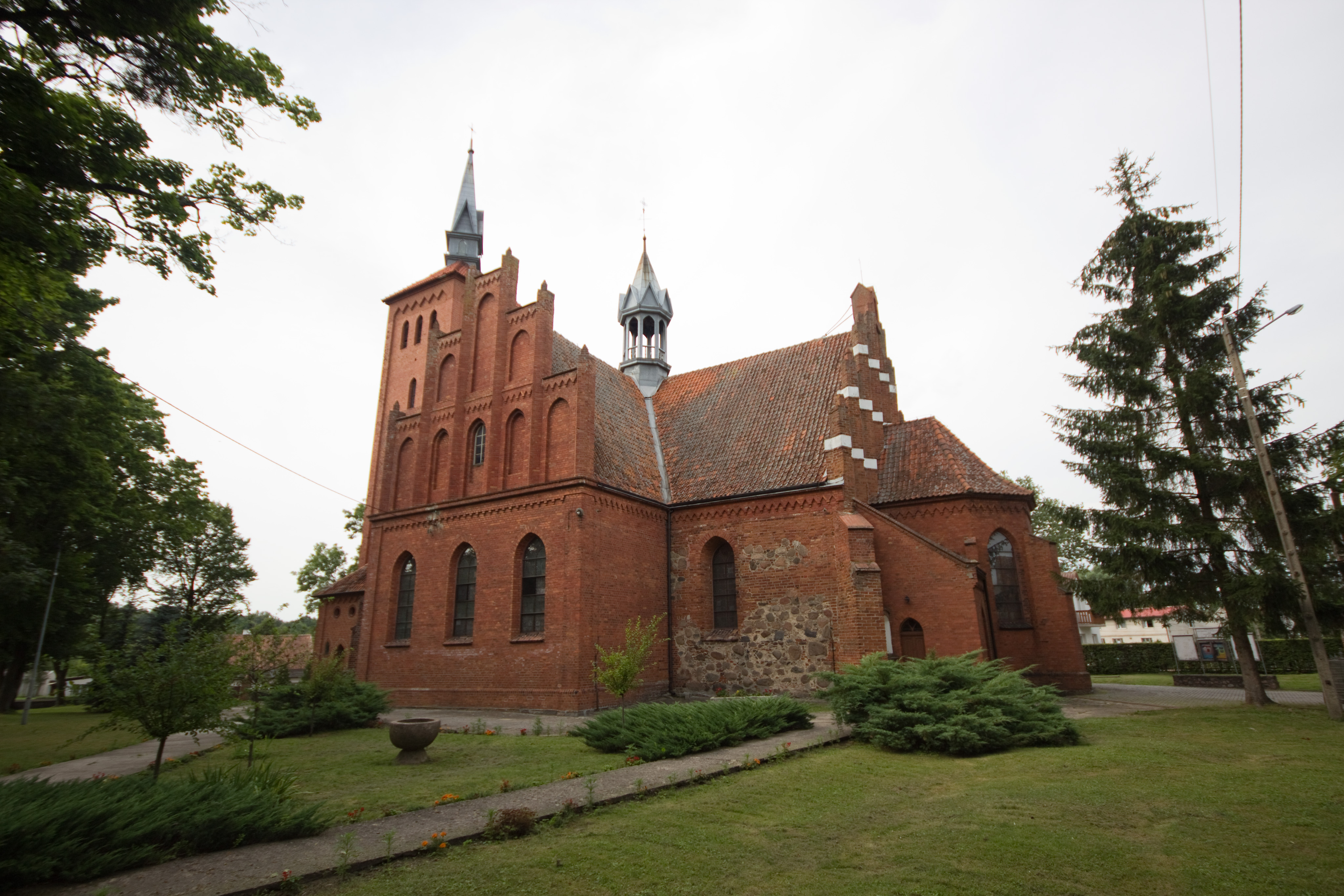
- Church of the Epiphany

- Location within Poland
- Coordinates: 53°59′49″N 20°59′43″E
- Country: Poland
- Voivodeship: Warmian-Masurian
- County: Olsztyn
- Gmina: Kolno
- Population: 590
- Time zone: UTC+1 (CET)
  - Summer (DST): UTC+2 (CEST)
- Vehicle registration: NOL

Kolno [ˈkɔlnɔ] is a village in Olsztyn County, Warmian-Masurian Voivodeship, in northern Poland. It is the seat of the gmina (administrative district) called Gmina Kolno. It is located in Warmia.

== Notable residents ==
- Josef Felix Pompeckj (1867–1930), German paleontologist and geologist
