= Otry =

- Village
- Location within Poland
- Coordinates: 53°57′23″N 21°4′3″E
- Country: Poland
- Voivodeship: Warmian-Masurian
- County: Olsztyn
- Gmina: Kolno
- Population: 70

Otry [ˈɔtrɨ] is a village in the administrative district of Gmina Kolno, within Olsztyn County, Warmian-Masurian Voivodeship, in northern Poland.
