= Plenowo =

- Village
- Location within Poland
- Coordinates: 53°58′36″N 21°9′29″E
- Country: Poland
- Voivodeship: Warmian-Masurian
- County: Kętrzyn
- Gmina: Reszel
- Population: 164

Plenowo [plɛˈnɔvɔ] is a village in the administrative district of Gmina Reszel, within Kętrzyn County, Warmian-Masurian Voivodeship, in northern Poland.
