= Zerbuń =

- Village
- Location within Poland
- Coordinates: 53°56′8″N 20°50′48″E
- Country: Poland
- Voivodeship: Warmian-Masurian
- County: Olsztyn
- Gmina: Jeziorany
- Population: 770

Zerbuń [ˈzɛrbuɲ] is a village in the administrative district of Gmina Jeziorany, within Olsztyn County, Warmian-Masurian Voivodeship, in northern Poland.
