= Sątoczno, Warmian-Masurian Voivodeship =

Sątoczno
- Village
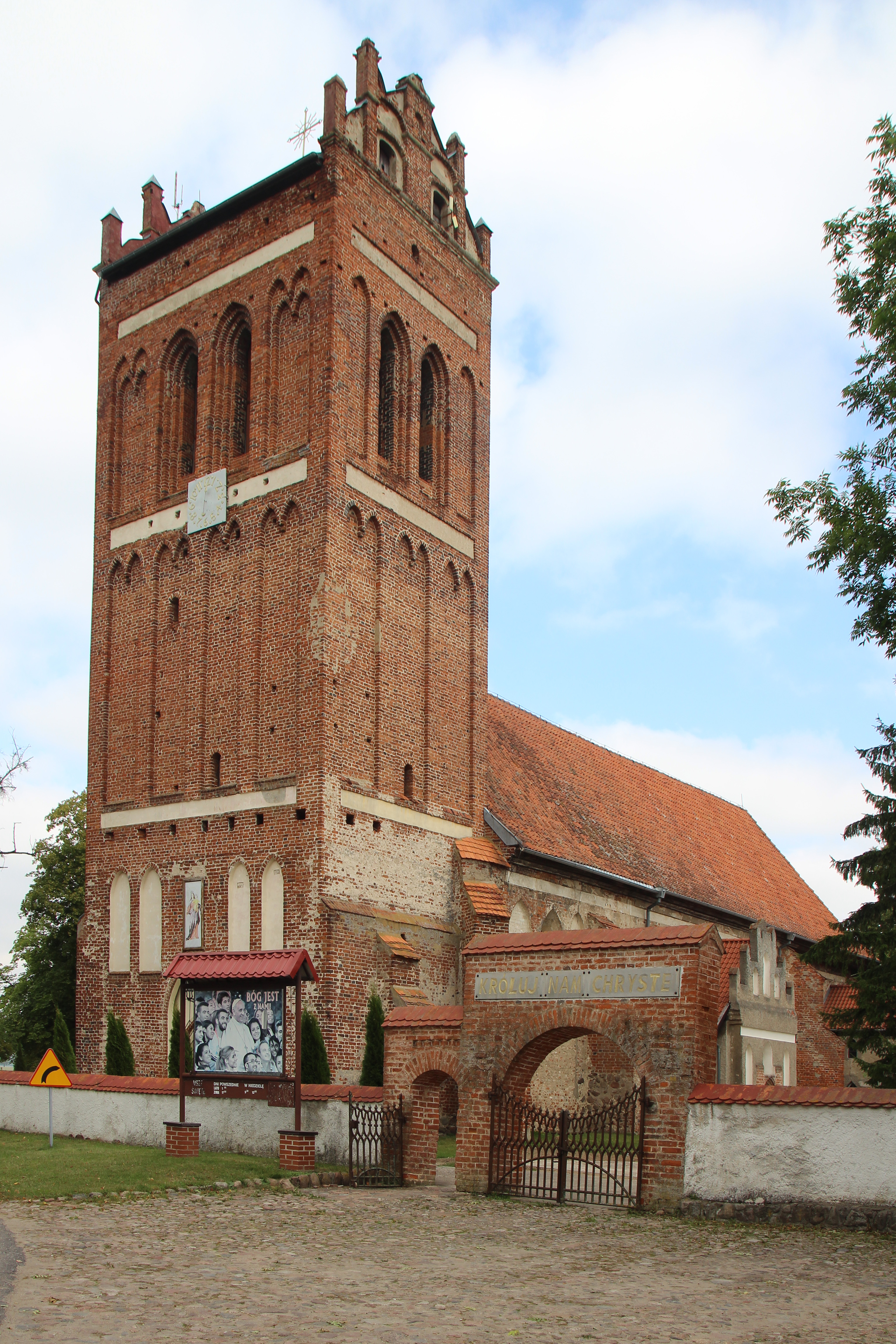
- Christ the King church in Sątoczno

- Location within Poland
- Coordinates: 54°14′N 21°6′E
- Country: Poland
- Voivodeship: Warmian-Masurian
- County: Kętrzyn
- Gmina: Korsze
- Population: 56 (2,016)

Sątoczno [sɔnˈtɔt͡ʂnɔ] is a village in the administrative district of Gmina Korsze, within Kętrzyn County, Warmian-Masurian Voivodeship, in northern Poland.
