= Jeziorany =

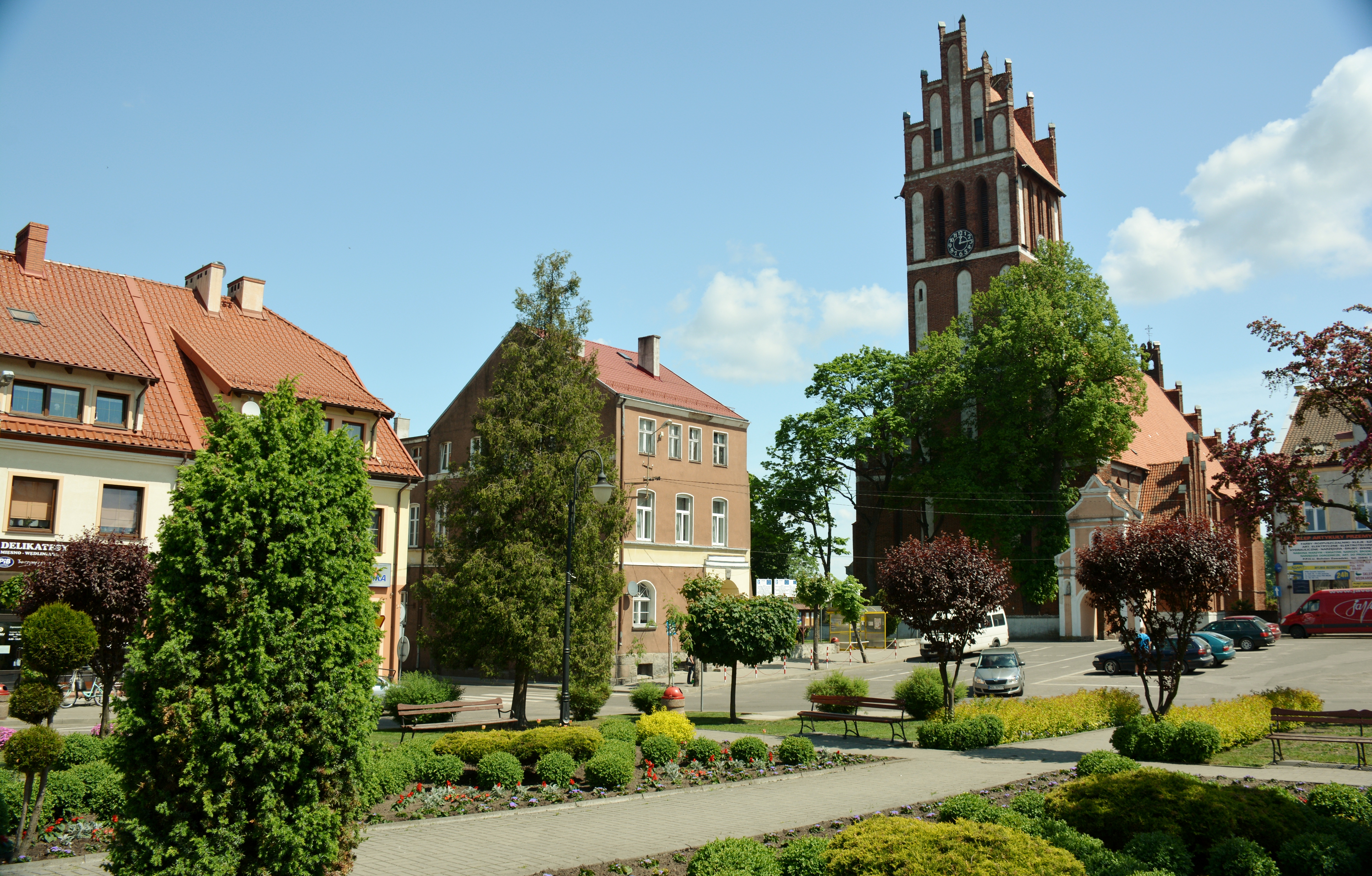
- Town square with the church of Saint Bartholomew

- Coat of arms

- Location within Poland
- Coordinates: 53°58′N 20°44′E
- Country: Poland
- Voivodeship: Warmian-Masurian
- County: Olsztyn
- Gmina: Jeziorany
- Town rights: 1338

Area
  - Total: 3.41 km^{2} (1.32 sq mi)

Population (2010)
  - Total: 3,320
  - Density: 974/km^{2} (2,520/sq mi)
- Time zone: UTC+1 (CET)
  - Summer (DST): UTC+2 (CEST)
- Postal code: 11-320
- Vehicle registration: NOL

Jeziorany ([jɛʑɔˈranɨ]; formerly also known in Polish as Zybork, German: Seeburg) is a town in Olsztyn County, Warmian-Masurian Voivodeship, in northern Poland, with 3,320 inhabitants (2010). It is located in the historic region of Warmia.

Jeziorany is a member of Cittaslow.

It was granted town rights based on Chełmno law in 1338. Historically, it was known in Polish both as Jeziorany and Zybork.

== Demographics ==
Historical population

Year	Pop.	±%
1871	2,916	—
1880	2,960	+1.5%
1890	2,797	−5.5%
1900	3,023	+8.1%
1910	2,965	−1.9%

Year	Pop.	±%
1925	2,847	−4.0%
1939	3,022	+6.1%
1950	1,659	−45.1%
1960	2,913	+75.6%
2010	3,320	+14.0%
