= Przanowski family =

Polish noble family

House of Przanowski
- Prince Przanowscy of Galicia and Lodomeria
- Parent house: Poniatowski
- Country: Poland
- Founded: c. 16th century
- Seat: Przanowice; Lubowice; Markuszewice; Kalisz; Chełm; Red Ruthenia; Dwór w Glanowie; Sandomierz; Galicia and Lodomeria
- Titles: Grand Prince Przanowscy of Galicia and Lodomeria; Prince of Przanowice; Prince of Red Ruthenia; Grand Duke of Red Ruthenia; Voivode of Red Ruthenia; Boyar of Przanowice; Boyar of Lubowice; Boyar of Sandomierz; Boyar of Red Ruthenia; Lord of Chełm; Lord of Kalisz
- Members: Norbert Przanowski; Edward Przanowski; Stefan Przanowski; Stefan Przanowski II; Mona Przanowska; Martina Przanowska

The House of Przanowski, also knowns as Przanowski of Nowina coat of arms (Polish: Przanowscy herbu Nowina), and as Perzanowski, is a Polish noble family originating from Sieradz region. It is a part of the boyar families of the Nowina heraldic clan.

== Early history ==
The Przanowski family (also known as Perzanowski) originates from the village of Przanowice in the Łęczyca Voivodeship. The Przanowski family established a court in Chełm and in Red Ruthenia in the early 17th century. The family signed the elections from the province Kalisz in 1669. They further signed elections from the province Sandomierz in 1669 and 1697. Initially, the Przanowski family promoted religious freedom for all subjects and thus obtained notoriety.

The qahal (Hebrew: קהל), an ancient Israelite society, predecessor to Alliance Israélite Universelle (and an Ashkenazi Jewish system of a self-governing community or kehila), endowed their support to the Przanowski family in the Sejm of Four Lands and therefore the vast majority of the Jewish community gave their support to the Przanowski family. The Jewish community in Kalisz was one of the most important in the Crown of the Kingdom of Poland, and the rabbis of Kalisz presided over the sessions of the Sejm of Four Lands (1581–1764). In 1669 with the support of the community the Przanowski family was able to establish the House of Przanowski.

Early members of the family include; Krzysztof Przanowski, who was the township clerk of Chełm from 1655 and selected as land judge of Busko in 1665; Jan Krzysztof Przanowski, who was land scribe of Czerniechów (Land scribe: an official of the land court, often from nobility, who manages property matters of the nobility) and Chorąży of Inowłódz; Wojciech Przanowski, who was appointed town clerk in Chełm 1663; Maciej Przanowski rector of the Jesuits in Kalisz 1746; and Ludwik Przanowski, who was appointed captain of the Crown Army in 1778.

They showed their nobility in Galicia in 1804, and in the Kingdom of Poland in 1844, 1854 and 1862. In the eighteenth and nineteenth centuries, they owned Lubowice in the province of Poznań and Markuszewice in the Lublin County.

== Second Generation Norbertines ==
=== Edward Przanowski ===
Edward Przanowski (1845-1929) graduated the Men's Gymnasium in Piotrków (Present: Bolesław I the Brave High School in Piotrków Trybunalski) and was admitted to the newly established Szkoła Główna Warszawska (Warsaw Main School) at the Faculty of Mathematics and Physics. Przanowski's studies was halted due to his involvement in the January Uprising. Edward fought in the party of General Edmund Taczanowski. On August 29, 1863, he was a part of the defeated forces of the battle of Kruszyna (Nieznanice) and was seriously wounded twice. According to his own testimony, the Cossacks (Ethnic group used for policing in the Russian Tsardom) went around the battlefield verifying that everyone apart from the insurgent was dead by piercing the bodies with pikes. Przanowski was one of the insurgent soldiers pierced. In his testimony, he details how, despite the pain, he was able to not make any noise or movement and thus survived. In 1864, Edward Przanowski practiced at the Road Administration of the Kingdom of Poland, and on December 22, 1868, he passed the exam and received the title of engineer-conductor.

At the age of 44, in 1889, Przanowski worked as an engineer in the cities of the Kingdom of Poland, which experienced regression in the second half of the 19th century as a result of tsarist post-uprising repressions. From 1866 to 1871, he was an engineer-conductor of the Sieradz district. In the years 1871–1880, he was an engineer and a district architect in Słupca. Przanowski was responsible, among others, for the technical infrastructure of the administered areas, road maintenance, renovation of public facilities, fire protection. In 1878, he was in charge of technical works on the construction of a church in the Evangelical-Augsburg parish in Zagórów near Słupca.

In 1880, Edward Przanowski was appointed as engineer and architect of the Łęczyca county. As a poviat engineer and architect, he drew up plans of towns in the Łęczyca region. Four of the plans have been preserved since 1893 in the Cartographic Collection of the Central Archives of Historical Records in Warsaw. The plans of Łęczyca, Grabów, Piątek, and Poddębice was a valuable source of spatial and urban development of the county.

In the historical records of Łęczyca county, Przanowski is noted as the architect and builder of the fire brigade headquarters. He made the architectural design and supervised the works. In order to construct the fire brigade headquarters, Przanowski made use of material from a partially demolished medieval castle. The neoclassic building besides hosting the fire brigade headquarters had a spacious theatre hall with capacity for an audience of over two hundred people. The building further hosted "several dozen" of galleries and other stores. The building, preserved to this day, is still the headquarters of the Łęczyca volunteer fire brigade.

Edward Przanowski was involved for many years with the Łęczyca volunteer fire brigade, one of the oldest and largest fire brigades in the Russian Partition. At that time, it was the only Polish civic organization in Łęczyca County. The Łęczyca volunteer fire brigade moreover conducted cultural and social activities in the city.

In 1882, Przanowski was elected as vice-chief of the Łęczyca volunteer fire brigade. In 1883, he was appointed as chief and chairman of the brigade. He stayed in the position continuously for 20 years, until 1903. Due to his engineering background, Przanowski was able to take care of the technical equipment as well as train the firefighters how to deal with technology. In 1888, he constructed the "climbing", an observation tower in the castle's courtyard. He was awarded an honorary fire-axe during the organization's quarter-century jubilee in 1900. In 1904, he was given the title of an honorary member of the Łęczyca guard - as the first in its history.

He acted as a representative of the alumni as well as current youth of the Main School of Warsaw (Polish: Szkoła Główna Warszawska) and initiated various social and cultural activities. In 1868, in Sieradz, he took part in amateur theatrical performances for the hospital and orphanage, run by the Welfare Council of Charitable Plants of the Sieradz District.

For three consecutive terms: 1883–1886, 1886-1889 and 1889–1892, he was elected to the Public Charity Council of Łęczyca County.

He initiated gymnastic exercises for a large group of children and teenagers. Przanowski denoted himself that the reason behind the initiative was "out of concern for the physical development of the young generation".

In March 1906, Przanowski was appointed as a member of the board of the Music and Drama Society in Łęczyca, which he conjointly had founded.

He collaborated with the editorial office of the Geographical Dictionary of the Kingdom of Poland and other Slavic countries - a work initiated by Filip Sulimierski, Przanowski's friend from the Junior High School in Piotrków (Present: Bolesław I the Brave High School in Piotrków Trybunalski) and the Warsaw Main School. Przanowski was mentioned among those declaring help in providing materials about individual cities and settlements.

After retirement, he moved to Warsaw and in 1912, was appointed as a board member and deputy chairman of the II Credit Union in Warsaw, located at 14 Erywańska Street. The II Credit Union in Warsaw provided financial services and managed over 2 000 members assets.

Edward Przanowski lived with his son Jan Przanowski in Walewice near Góra Kalwaria, and from 1924 in Nowa Wieśnear Starogard Gdański with his son Stefan Przanowski. Edward Przanowski died on February 6, 1929, in Nowa Wieśnear Starogard Gdański and was buried in the parish cemetery in Starogard Gdański, with military honors of the 2nd Regiment of Rokitnian Light Cavalry (Polish: 2 Pułk Szwoleżerów Rokitniańskich). In the 1980s, thanks to the efforts of the Society of Lovers of the Kociewie Land (Polish: Towarzystwa Miłośników Ziemi Kociewskiej), the destroyed tomb of Przanowski was restored; in 1984, a commemorative plaque was unveiled in Nowa Wieś, and a street was named after him in Starogard Gdański.

== Third Generation Nobertines ==
The third generation of Norbertine Przanowski was prominent in the realm of politics, business and military. Noted individuals of the third generation include: Minister Stefan Przanowski, Sejm representative Jan Przanowski I [pl], PIRR Director Władysław Przanowski [pl], Przasnyszu merchant Michał Przanowski, Cukrowni Director Kazimierz Przanowski, Jadwiga Przanowska (wife of pharmaceutical mogul Antonim Kadeczem), Wanda Przanowska (wife of Rawa Mazowiecka health care mogul Wacław Wągrowski), Maria Przanowska (wife of economist Żelisław Grotowski [pl]).

== Finance and Banking ==
During the late 19th century the Przanowski family's presence in the private sector grew increasingly. Notable companies the family was involved in include:

- II Credit Union in Warsaw (today Spółdzielcza kasa oszczędnościowo-kredytowa; one of the largest credit unions in Poland)
- Bank Polski (today PKO Bank Polski; Poland's largest bank)
- Bank Śląski (today ING Bank Śląski; Polands second largest bank)
- Bank Dyskontowy (Polish bank)
- Polska Wytwórnia Papierów Wartościowych (joint stock printing company today controlled by the State Treasury)
- Giełda Pieniężna w Warszawie (today the Warsaw Stock Exchange)
- Górnośląskie Zjednoczone Huty "Królewska" i "Laura" w Katowicach. (a Polish industrial group)

== Notable members ==
Notable members of the Przanowski family include:

- Edward Przanowski
- Stefan Przanowski
- Stefan Przanowski Jr.
- Mona Przanowska

== Bibliography ==
- Palmer, Alan. Alexander I: Tsar of War and Peace (Faber & Faber, 2014).
- Brykczynski, Paul. "Prince Adam Czartoryski as a liminal figure in the development of modern nationalism in Eastern Europe at the turn of the eighteenth and nineteenth centuries." Nationalities Papers 38.5 (2010): 647–669.
- Kukiel, Marian. Czartoryski and European Unity (1955).
- Morley, Charles. "Czartoryski as a Polish Statesman." Slavic Review 30.3 (1971): 606–614. Online
- Thackeray, Frank W., and John E. Findling, eds. Statesmen who changed the world: a bio-bibliographical dictionary of diplomacy (Greenwood, 1993). pp 149–57
- Zawadzki, W. H. "Prince Adam Czartoryski and Napoleonic France, 1801–1805: A Study in Political Attitudes." Historical Journal 18.2 (1975): 245–277.
- Anna Mazanek, Towarzystwo Historyczno-Literackie, w: Literatura Polska, przewodnik encyklopedyczny, Warsaw 1985, v. II
- Sławomir Kalembka, Z dziejów czasopiśmiennictwa naukowego emigracji popowstaniowych – "Rocznik Towarzystwa Historyczno-Literackiego w Paryżu, "Acta Universitatis Nicolai Copernici. Nauki Humanistyczno-Społeczne. Historia", T. XIX, 1984, p. 131–148.
- Kershaw, Alister, Murder in France (London: Constable, 1955).
- L'episcopat francais, 1802–1905 (Paris, 1907), 215–16; 460–61, passim
- McCaffrey, Lawrence, History of the Catholic Church in the Nineteenth Century, I (2nd ed., Dublin, 1910), 63, 236, 241, 243–4.
- Dumoulin, Aline; Ardisson, Alexandra; Maingard, Jérôme; Antonello, Murielle; Églises de Paris (2010), Éditions Massin, Issy-Les-Moulineaux, ISBN 978-2-7072-0683-1
- Magocsi, Paul R. (1983). Galicia: A Historical Survey and Bibliographic Guide. Toronto: University of Toronto Press. ISBN 9780802024824.
- Wolff, Larry (2004). "Inventing Galicia: Messianic Josephinism and the Recasting of Partitioned Poland". Slavic Review. 63 (4): 818–840. doi:10.2307/1520422. JSTOR 1520422. S2CID 155170075.
- Wolff, Larry (2008). "Kennst du das Land? The Uncertainty of Galicia in the Age of Metternich and Fredro". Slavic Review. 67 (2): 277–300. doi:10.1017/S0037677900023536. JSTOR 27652844. S2CID 164814456.
- Wolff, Larry (2010). The Idea of Galicia: History and Fantasy in Habsburg Political Culture. Stanford: Stanford University Press. ISBN 9780804774291.
- Norman Davies Vanished Kingdoms: The History of Half-Forgotten Europe. Allen Lane. ISBN 978-1-84614-338-0
- Andrei S. Markovits and Frank E. Sysyn, eds., Nationbuilding and the Politics of Nationalism: Essays on Austrian Galicia (Cambridge, Mass.: Harvard University Press, 1982). Contains an important article by Piotr Wandycz on the Poles, and an equally important article by Ivan L. Rudnytsky on the Ukrainians.
- Christopher Hann and Paul Robert Magocsi, eds., Galicia: A Multicultured Land (Toronto: University of Toronto Press, 2005). A collection of articles by John Paul Himka, Yaroslav Hrytsak, Stanislaw Stepien, and others.
- Taylor, A. J. P., The Habsburg Monarchy 1809–1918, 1941, discusses Habsburg policy toward ethnic minorities.
- Alison Fleig Frank, Oil Empire: Visions of Prosperity in Austrian Galicia (Cambridge, MA: Harvard University Press, 2005). A new monograph on the history of the Galician oil industry in both the Austrian and European contexts.
- Drdacki, Moritz knight by Ostrow, the glad patents Galziens a contribution to customer of the Unterthanswesens, printed with J.P. Sollinger, Vienna, 1838, Reprint 1990, Scherer publishing house Berlin, ISBN 3-89433-024-4
- Kratter, F., letters over itzigen condition of Galicia a contribution to the Staatistik and knowledge of human nature, publishing house G. Ph. of usurer, Leipzig 1786, Reprint 1990, Scherer publishing house Berlin, ISBN 3-89433-001-5
- Mueller, Sepp, from the settlement to the resettlement, Wiss. contribution to history and regional studies of east Central Europe, hrsg. v. Joh. Gottfr. Herder Joh.-Gottfr.-Herder-Institut Marburg, NR. 54 Rohrer, Josef, remarks on a journey of the Turkish Graenze over the Bukowina by east and west Galicia, Schlesien and Maehren to Vienna, publishing house Anton Pichler, Vienna 1804, Reprint 1989, Scherer publishing house Berlin, ISBN 3-89433-010-4
- statistic Central Commission (Hrsg.), local repertory of the Kingdom of Galicia and Lodomerien with the Herzogthume Krakau, publishing house Carl Gerolds son, Vienna 1874, Reprint 1989, Scherer publishing house Berlin, ISBN 3-89433-015-5
- Stupnicki, Hipolit, the Kingdom of Galicia and Lodomerien sammt the Grossherzogthume Krakau and the Herzogthume Bukowina in geographical-historical-statistic relationship, printed with Peter Piller, Lviv 1853, Reprint 1989, Scherer publishing house Berlin, ISBN 3-89433-016-3
- Traunpaur, Alfons Heinrich Chevalier d'Orphanie, Dreyssig of letters over Galicia or observations of a[n] unpartheyischen man, Vienna 1787, Reprint 1990, Scherer publishing house Berlin, ISBN 3-89433-013-9
