= Nowa Wieś Reszelska =

- Village
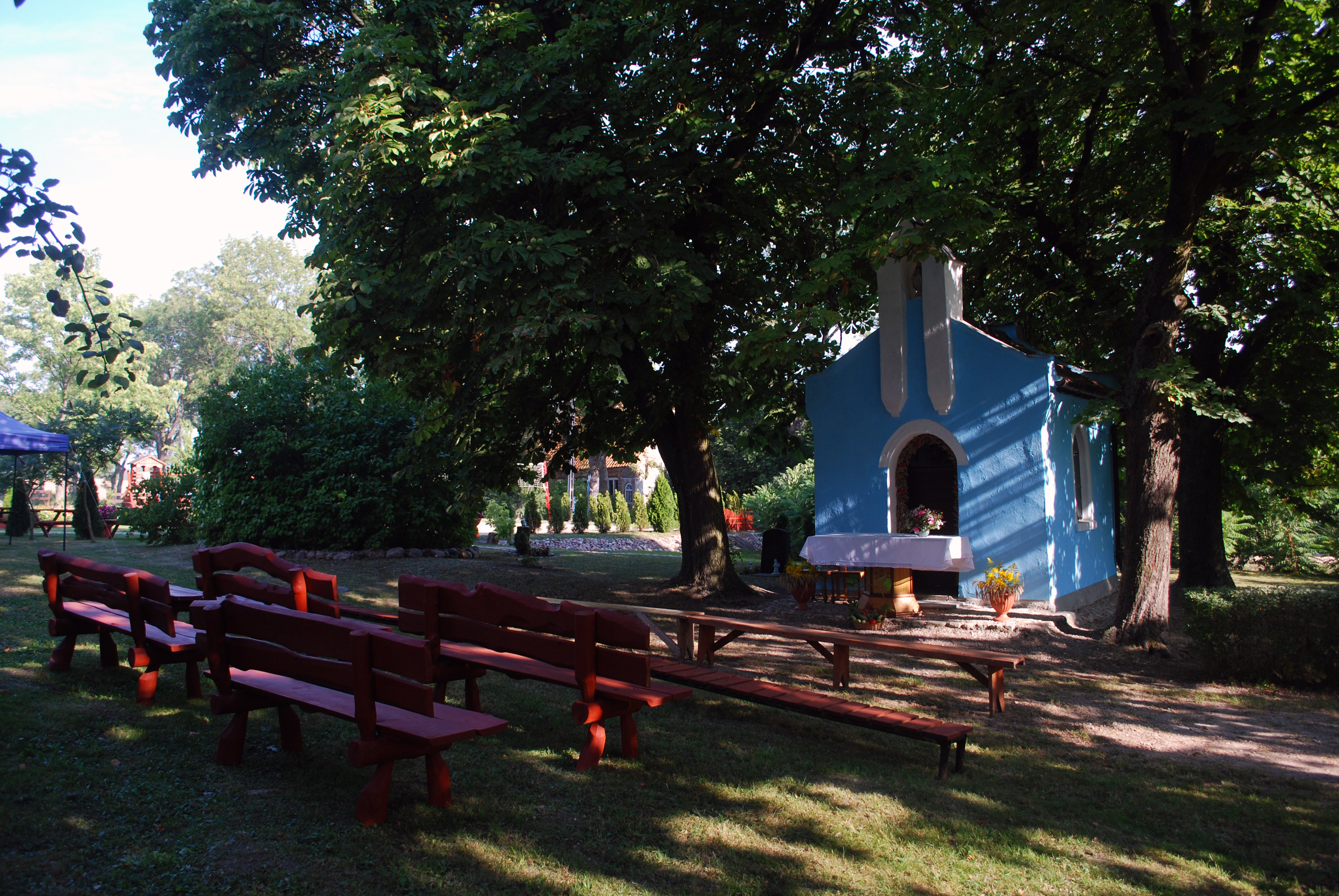
- The shrine to Virgin Mary in Nowa Wieś Reszelska

- Location within Poland
- Coordinates: 54°05′09″N 20°59′44″E
- Country: Poland
- Voivodeship: Warmian-Masurian
- County: Bartoszyce
- Gmina: Bisztynek

Nowa Wieś Reszelska [ˈnɔva ˈvjɛɕ rɛˈʂɛlska] is a village in the administrative district of Gmina Bisztynek, within Bartoszyce County, Warmian-Masurian Voivodeship, in northern Poland.

The village is located in the north of the Warmia and Mazury voivodeship, 9 km (6 mi) from Bisztynek. In 2010, it had a population of 40. In 1975–1998, when a different administrative division was in place, it was located in Olsztyn Voivodeship. Each August 26, Nowa Wieś Reszelska becomes a destination for pilgrims who come from nearby villages to participate in a mass and church fair that take place at the Shrine of the Blessed Virgin Mary of Częstochowa.

== The shrine's history ==
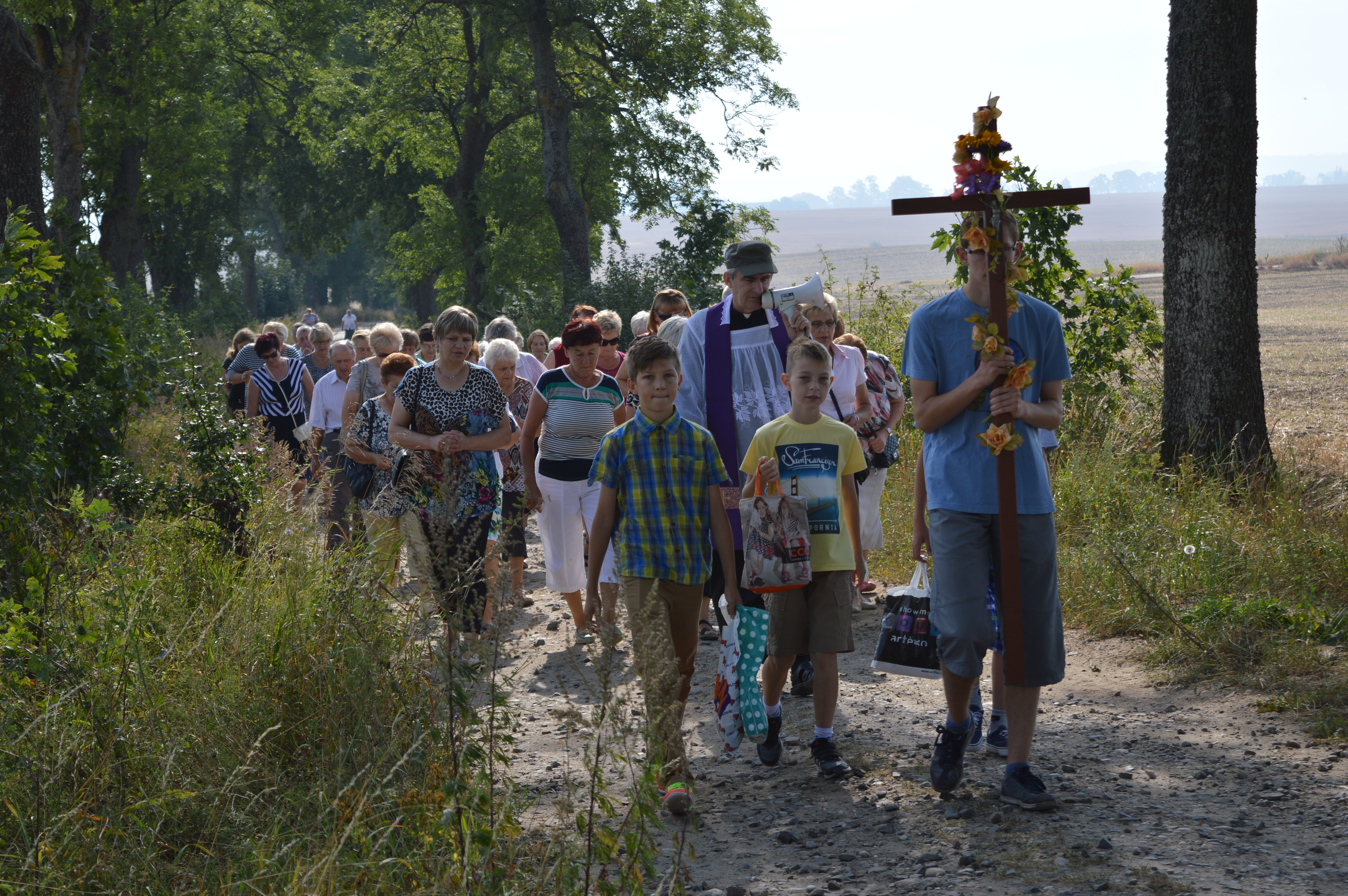
Pilgrims entering Nowa Wieś Reszelska

The shrine was built at the turn of the 20th century. Such shrines are quite common in the Warmia region. The shrine was considered to be a historical monument as early as in the 1920s and 1930s, and it was registered in the Historic Preservation Office in Königsberg. Typically for Warmia's shrines, it was built on private land.

The shrine is a mix of folk and sacral architecture. Originally covered only in white plaster, later it was painted in a variety of colours - white, celadon and blue, and there used to be standing crosses around it, since it probably was a burial site after the First World War. There are several shrines like this in the area (St. Anthony's Shrine in Warmiany, St. Peter and Paul's Shrine in Łędławki, the historic filial shrine in Księżno). Unlike a typical roadside shrine, the ones from the Warmia region are small, one-room buildings. Local people used them in place of churches. They were also built on private land as an expression of gratitude for recovering from an illness, or avoiding a natural disaster like flood or fire.

After the Second World War the villagers from Nowa Wieś Reszelska would organize May Devotions in the shrine. They were held without a priest and Marian litanies and songs were sung by the faithful. Usually the service was led by a woman from the village. The June services were also held there, as well as the October rosary meetings. After the war, paintings and sculptures had been found at the shrine – such as a Pietà and an Ascension scene. However, some of them had been stolen and others, due to their condition, were given to the Museum of Warmia & Mazury in Olsztyn. Today, only the altar and sculptures of saints are original, pre-war works of art.

When in 1978 Karol Wojtyła became the pope, Stanisław Szymko, a villager, funded the shrine's renovation. Other villagers helped in the work, and when it was complete, women from Nowa Wieś Reszelska decided to buy a new painting in Olsztyn, which still hangs in the shrine. The painting depicts the Blessed Virgin Mary of Częstochowa and was consecrated by the Reverend Eugeniusz Bukowski.

== The shrine today ==
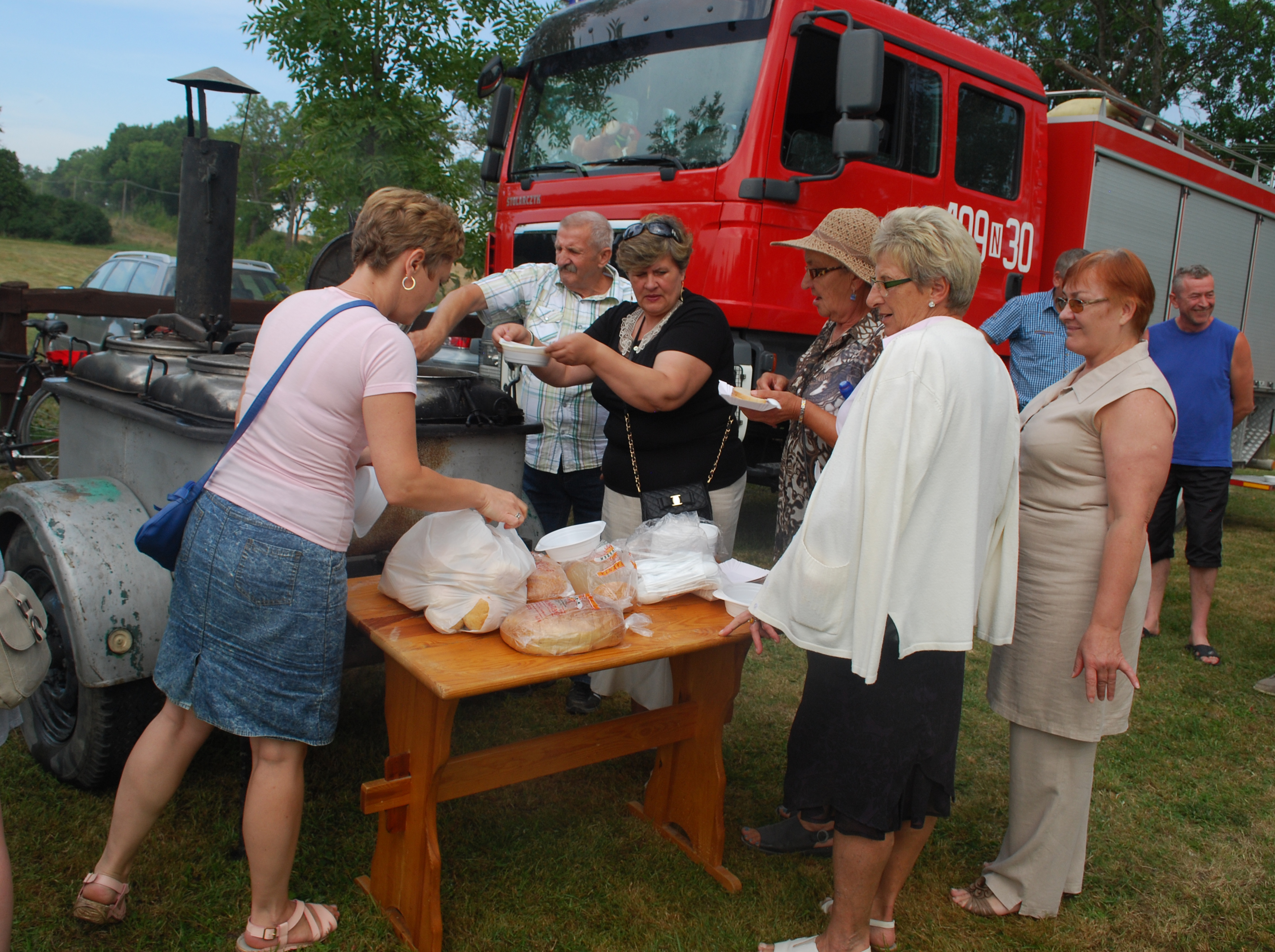
During the fair traditional pea soup is offered to the visitors free of charge.

Each Easter the traditional food blessing takes place at the shrine. In May the faithful gather there for May Devotions and on 26 August (the Virgin Mary of Częstochowa Day) a Plenary Indulgence Mass is celebrated. According to a Warmia tradition, once a year a plenary indulgence mass has to be celebrated on the day of a shrine's patron saint. It was this ceremony that drew the attention of the people living in the nearby village of Sątopy, who eventually began to travel to Nowa Wieś Reszelska to attend the plenary indulgence mass. Jadwiga Kuźlik, the village leader, had the shrine renovated and painted blue - the colour of Virgin Mary.

== The pilgrimage ==
The tradition of pilgrimages to the Shrine of Virgin Mary of Częstochowa began with the Reverend Józef Leonowicz, who first consecrated the shrine and then organized a church fair and pilgrimage. Although no more than 7 families lived in Nowa Wieś Reszelska, the news about the pilgrimage spread across the whole area. With each coming year, more and more people from neighbouring villages participated in the mass and the fair. At one time over 100 people participated in the event. Pilgrimages to nearby sites (in the Warmia dialect called łosiera) usually take place near large religious centres like the marine sanctuary in Święta Lipka. Pilgrimages to such a small shrine like the one in Nowa Wieś Reszelska are very rare.

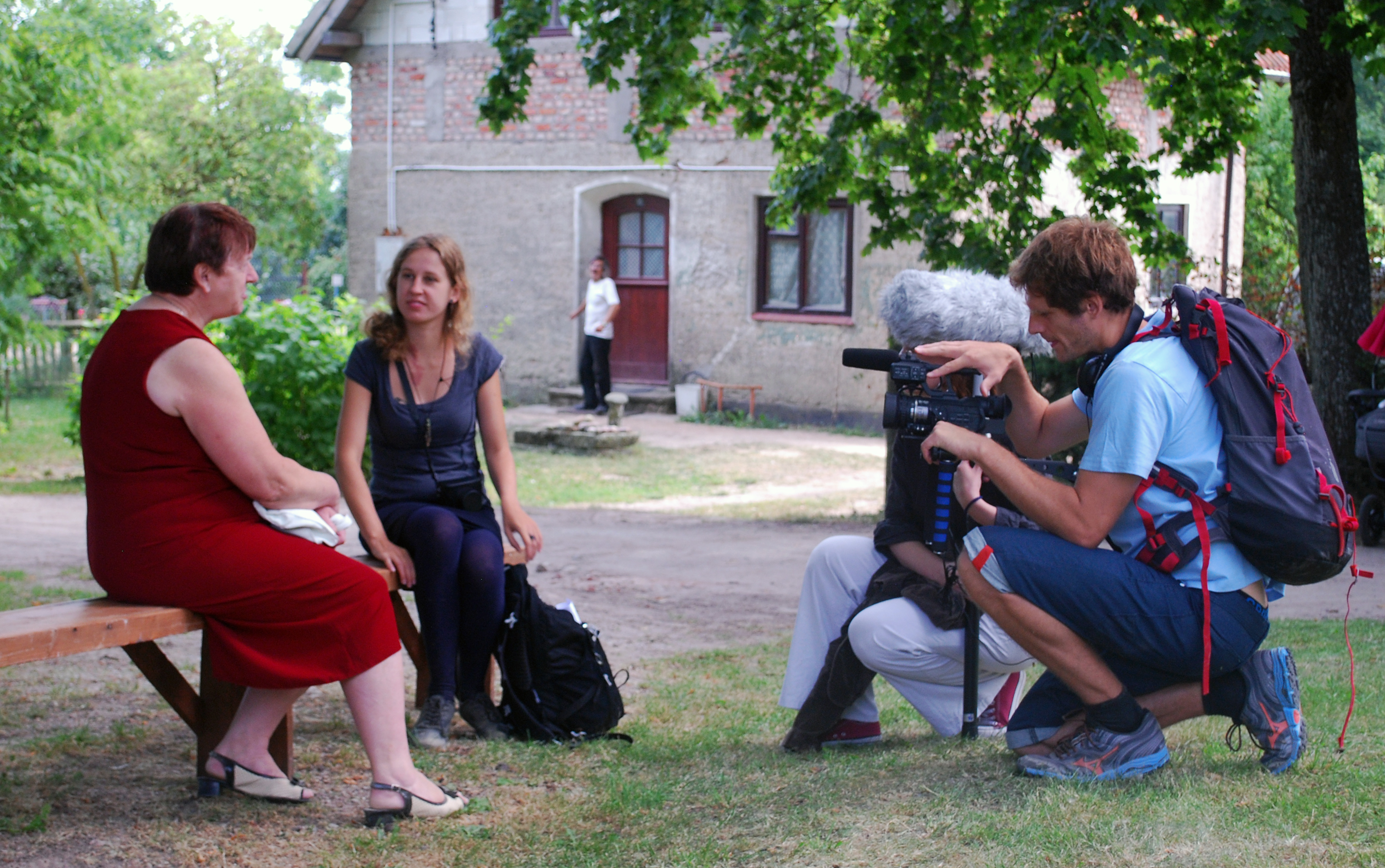
Ethnographers interviewing participants of the yearly pilgrimage

The annual pilgrimage from Sątopy to Nowa Wieś Reszelska has been taking place for at least 20 years. Initially the pilgrimage, mass and fair were held on 26 August, on the Day of Blessed Virgin Mary of Częstochowa. However, since the mass started to be accompanied by a fair and a beach volleyball match, the event has been moved to the last or third Saturday of August.

== The contemporary pilgrimage ==
In August 2015 the person leading the procession held a flower-adorned cross. Three young boys, who symbolized the Holy Trinity, walked behind it and they were followed by a priest and then the rest of the faithful - about 50 people. During the procession religious songs were sung and mid-way flowers were laid at a small, roadside shrine. The pilgrimage travelled to the Shrine of Virgin Mary of Częstochowa in Nowa Wieś Reszelska. In 2015 over 50 people, mostly elderly, participated in the event.

== The plenary indulgence mass ==
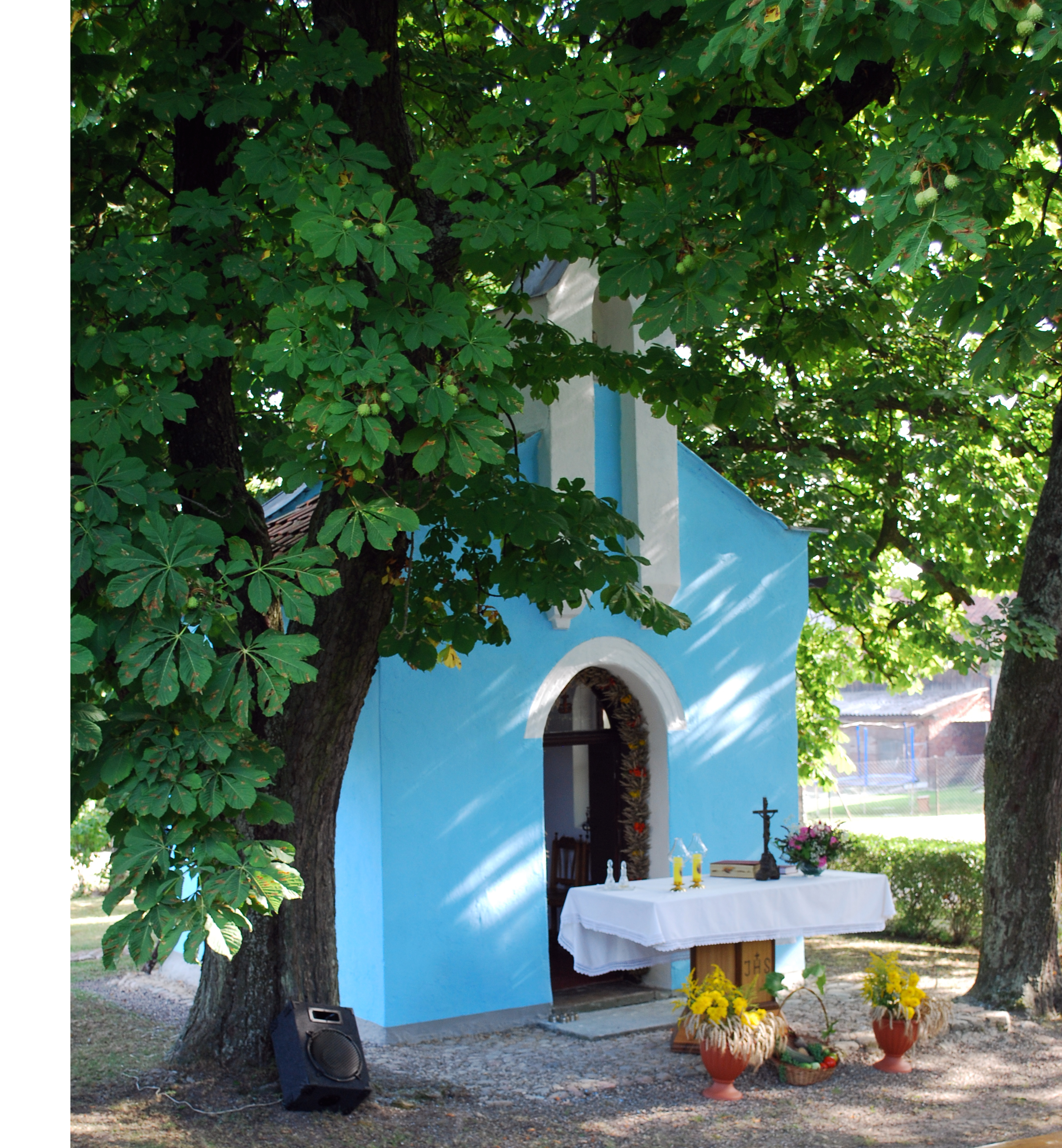
As the chapel is small, the mass is held outdoors.

On the day of the mass the pilgrims sit on benches in front of the shrine. Then the holy mass takes place. Receiving indulgence is the reason for the pilgrimage and confession is the most important element of the mass. Since there are no confessionals in the shrine, the confession usually takes place in the open air. Some people still remember that in 1994 the Reverend Leonowicz due to heavy rains heard confessions in his car: "He heard confessions in a Polonez car. Each of us would enter, he was sitting behind the wheel, and we confessed our sins".

== Harvest festival ==
The Mass on the Virgin Mary of Częstochowa Day coincides with the local harvest festival and a variety of flower and plant adornments decorate the shrine and the altar. During the Mass a harvest festival bread is placed on the altar, where it remains until the mass' end. Afterwards the village leader shares it with the pilgrims. Pots with flowers and ears of wheat and rye as well as wicker baskets filled with vegetables stand next to the altar. They symbolize the year's harvest. The shrine's entrance is festooned with garlands as well.

== The fair ==
After the mass, a fair takes place near the shrine, during which a beach volleyball tournament is held, local specialities are available and women from Nowa Wieś Reszelska offer home-made food. The harvest festival bread is divided among the pilgrims.
