= Jan Przanowski =

Polish lawyer and politician (1873–1940)

General Jan Przanowski
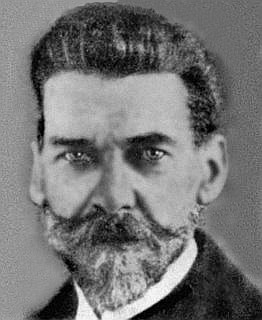
- Przanowski c. 1920s

Judge Advocate General
- Preceded by: Office Created
- Succeeded by: Office Abolished

Member of the Legislative Sejm of the 3rd term
- In office 16 November 1930 – 15 September 1935
- Prime Minister: See list: Walery Sławek; Józef Piłsudski; Aleksander Prystor; Janusz Jędrzejewicz; Leon Kozłowski
- Preceded by: Constituency Established
- Succeeded by: Constituency Abolished (as a result of the Sanation)

Vice-Chairman of Circle of Polish Lawyers
- In office 1907–1940
- President: Franciszek Nowodworski
- Deputy: Leon Supiński
- Preceded by: Kazimierz Bartel
- Succeeded by: Kazimierz Bartel

Personal details
- Born: Jan Przanowski h. Nowina; 8 March 1873 Słupca, Kalisz Governorate, Congress Poland, Russian Empire
- Died: 28 November 1940 (aged 67) Warsaw, General Government
- Resting place: Powązki Cemetery in Warsaw (Section 169, Row 1, Plot 4), near the Avenue of the Distinguished.
- Party: National Democracy
- Other political affiliations: Liberal (1907–1930)
- Spouse: Maria Nowak (m. 1899; died 1940)
- Children: Janina Przanowska; Magdalena Staszewska
- Relatives: Przanowski family
- Profession: Lawyer and Politician
- Nickname: The Oxe

Military service
- Allegiance: Congress Poland; Second Polish Republic
- Branch/service
- Years of service: 1895–1918; 1922–1940
- Rank: Judge Advocate General
- Battles/wars

Jan Przanowski (8 March 1873 - 28 November 1941) was a Polish lawyer and politician who served as a member of the parliament of Poland from 1930 to 1935 and judge advocate general of the Polish Armed Forces from 1920 to 1930. As a member of the National Party, he served during the 3rd term of Sejm of the Second Polish Republic.

== Early life ==
Jan Przanowski was born on 8 March 1873, the son of Edward Przanowski (1845–1929), a participant in the January Uprising, and chief engineer of Słupca and Łęczyca, and his wife Józefa Przanowska (née Lewicka; 1851–1939). He was the brother of Stefan Przanwoski, a powerful statesman and minister who served as disputed prime minister of Poland in 1922.

In 1891, Jan Przanowski graduated from the Men's Gymnasium in Kalisz, and in 1895, he completed his studies at the Faculty of Law of the University of Warsaw.

== Career ==
In 1897, he worked as an assistant to a sworn attorney. In 1898, he was appointed as a legal defender at the Commercial Court and the Justice of the Peace Court in Warsaw. In 1900, he was appointed a sworn attorney and opened a law office in Warsaw on Senatorska Street 26. That same year, together with attorney Władysław Chrzanowski, he established an illegal organization called the Circle of Young Lawyers, which began operating legally under the name Circle of Polish Lawyers in 1906. He was a member of the board, serving as deputy secretary and treasurer, and later became vice-president of the organization. Additionally, he was active in the Society for the Care of Prisoners "Patronat" and worked as a librarian for the Citizens' Resource Association in Warsaw located at Resursa Obywatelska Palace.

In 1911, he purchased the Walewice estate near Góra Kalwaria and devoted himself to agriculture. After selling Walewice, he moved to Imielenko in the Gniezno County. He likely closed his Warsaw law office in 1918. On 16 November 1920, he assumed the office of Judge Advocate General of the Polish Army

Although he was a non-believer, he became affiliated with the National Democracy movement. Between 1930 and 1935, he served as a member of parliament during the Third Term of the Sejm of the Republic of Poland, representing electoral district number 33, Gniezno County. In the Sejm, he was a member of the National Club, which was opposed to the Sanation government. He spoke several times during plenary sessions, particularly on agricultural matters.

== Personal life ==
In 1899, he was married to Maria Przanowska (née Nowak), with whom he had two daughters:

- Janina Przanowska (born 1900), who worked in the Chancellery of the Polish Parliament before World War II and, after the war, in the administration of Poznań University.
- Magdalena Staszewska (1904–1978), who was married to historian Janusz Staszewski. During World War II, Magdalena was involved with the underground organization "Ojczyzna" and collaborated with Professor Zygmunt Wojciechowski in establishing the Secret University of the Western Lands in Warsaw. After the war, she worked at the Western Institute in Poznań until 1967, serving as deputy head of the Publishing Department and contributing to the editorial board of Przegląd Zachodni (Western Review).

== Later life ==
In the 1930s, he worked at the Massalski law office in Warsaw. During the German occupation, he continued working in the office as a notarial assessor. He died in 1941 and was buried in Powązki Cemetery in Warsaw (Section 169, Row 1, Plot 4), near the Avenue of the Distinguished.

== See also ==
- Przanowski family
- Stefan Przanowski
- Edward Przanowski

== Sources ==
=== Prints ===
- Słownik biograficzny adwokatów polskich, tom II, zeszyt 3/4: M–Ż. Warszawa, 2007 (author biogramu: Marek Wasiak)
- P. Majewski, Posłowie i senatorowie Rzeczypospolitej Polskiej 1919–1939: słownik biograficzny. Tom 4: M–P. Warszawa: Wydawnictwo Sejmowe, 2009.
- Przanowski Stefan (1874–1938), [w:] Polski Słownik Biograficzny. Wrocław: Ossolineum, 1985 tom XXVIII/4, s. 640–642 (author biogramu: Ryszard Szwoch).
