= Felicjan Kępiński =

Polish astronomer

- Scientific career
- Fields: Astrophysics

Felicjan Kępiński (29 April 1885, in Piotrków Trybunalski, Poland – 8 April 1966, in Warsaw) was a Polish astronomer.

== Work ==
In 1903 he graduated from the government secondary school in Piotrków Trybunalski, later the Bolesław I the Brave High School in Piotrków Trybunalski. In 1905 he took part in a students’ strike. As part of this boycott of Russian universities, he chose to study abroad. He studied mathematics and astronomy at the University of Leipzig (1905–1906), the University of Göttingen (1906–1909) and the University of Berlin (1909–1912). In 1913 he received his doctorate.

During the First World War he worked at the Berlin-Babelsberg Observatory. In 1918, after Poland regained its independence, he moved to Warsaw. He later became an assistant professor at the Astronomical Observatory of the University of Warsaw, where he remained until 1927. In 1925 he received his postdoctoral degree at the University of Vilnius. In 1927 he became an associate professor at the Warsaw University of Technology, where he founded the astronomical observatory and acted as its director from 1925 to 1955. In 1937 he became a full professor at the Faculty of Engineering of the Warsaw University of Technology.

In 1921, he initiated the publication of the Astronomical Yearbook (Rocznik Astronomiczny), of which he was an editor for many years.

Felicjan Kepiński was engaged in long-term research on the movement of the comet 22P/Kopff, and later used this research as the basis for his papers on the mechanics of heaven. In his work he dealt with issues concerning geodetic astronomy.

In 1960, Kępiński officially retired. He died on 8 April 1966 and was buried at Powązki Cemetery in Warsaw.

In 1979, the International Astronomical Union named the Kępiński crater on the Moon after Felicjan Kępiński.
