= Lądek =

Lądek may refer to the following places:

- Lądek, Konin County in Greater Poland Voivodeship (west-central Poland)
- Lądek, Słupca County in Greater Poland Voivodeship (west-central Poland)
- Lądek, Warmian-Masurian Voivodeship (north Poland)
