= Edward Przanowski =

Polish soldier

Edward Przanowski (13 October 1845, Glanów - 6 February 1929, Nowa Wieś, Starogard Gdański) was a Polish soldier of the January Uprising, chief engineer and architect in Słupca and Łęczyca; chieftain and chairman of the Łęczyca volunteer fire brigade; committee president of the Public Charity Council of the Łęczyca County; council and chancellery supervisor of the II Credit Union in Warsaw. He was the child of Norbert Przanowski.

== Biography ==
=== Early life ===
Edward Przanowski (1845–1929) graduated the Men's Gymnasium in Piotrków (Present: Bolesław I the Brave High School in Piotrków Trybunalski) and was admitted to the newly established Szkoła Główna Warszawska (Warsaw Main School) at the Faculty of Mathematics and Physics. Przanowski's studies was halted due to his involvement in the January Uprising. Edward fought in the party of General Edmund Taczanowski. On August 29, 1863, he was a part of the defeated forces of the battle of Kruszyna (Nieznanice) and was seriously wounded twice. According to his own testimony, the Cossacks (Ethnic group used for policing in the Russian Tsardom) went around the battlefield verifying that everyone apart from the insurgent was dead by piercing the bodies with pikes. Przanowski was one of the insurgent soldiers pierced. In his testimony, he details how, despite the pain, he was able to not make any noise or movement and thus survived. In 1864, Edward Przanowski practiced at the Road Administration of the Kingdom of Poland, and on December 22, 1868, he passed the exam and received the title of engineer-conductor.

=== Architecture, engineering & development ===
At the age of 44, in 1889, Przanowski worked as an engineer in the cities of the Kingdom of Poland, which experienced regression in the second half of the 19th century as a result of tsarist post-uprising repressions. From 1866 to 1871, he was an engineer-conductor of the Sieradz district. In the years 1871–1880, he was an engineer and a district architect in Słupca. Przanowski was responsible, among others, for the technical infrastructure of the administered areas, road maintenance, renovation of public facilities, fire protection. In 1878, he was in charge of technical works on the construction of a church in the Evangelical-Augsburg parish in Zagórów near Słupca.

In 1880, Edward Przanowski was appointed as engineer and architect of the Łęczyca county. As a poviat engineer and architect, he drew up plans of towns in the Łęczyca region. Four of the plans have been preserved since 1893 in the Cartographic Collection of the Central Archives of Historical Records in Warsaw. The plans of Łęczyca, Grabów, Piątek, and Poddębice was a valuable source of spatial and urban development of the county.

=== Łęczyca Fire Brigade ===
In the historical records of Łęczyca county, Przanowski is noted as the architect and builder of the fire brigade headquarters. He made the architectural design and supervised the works. In order to construct the fire brigade headquarters, Przanowski made use of material from a partially demolished medieval castle. The neoclassic building besides hosting the fire brigade headquarters had a spacious theatre hall with capacity for an audience of over two hundred people. The building further hosted “several dozen” of galleries and other stores. The building, preserved to this day, is still the headquarters of the Łęczyca volunteer fire brigade.

Edward Przanowski was involved for many years with the Łęczyca volunteer fire brigade, one of the oldest and largest fire brigades in the Russian Partition. At that time, it was the only Polish civic organization in Łęczyca County. The Łęczyca volunteer fire brigade moreover conducted cultural and social activities in the city.

In 1882, Przanowski was elected as vice-chief of the Łęczyca volunteer fire brigade. In 1883, he was appointed as chief and chairman of the brigade. He stayed in the position continuously for 20 years, until 1903. Due to his engineering background, Przanowski was able to take care of the technical equipment as well as train the firefighters how to deal with technology. In 1888, he constructed the “climbing”, an observation tower in the castle's courtyard. He was awarded an honorary fire-axe during the organization's quarter-century jubilee in 1900. In 1904, he was given the title of an honorary member of the Łęczyca guard - as the first in its history.

=== Public initiatives ===
He acted as a representative of the alumni as well as current youth of the Main School of Warsaw (Polish: Szkoła Główna Warszawska) and initiated various social and cultural activities. In 1868, in Sieradz, he took part in amateur theatrical performances for the hospital and orphanage, run by the Welfare Council of Charitable Plants of the Sieradz District.

For three consecutive terms: 1883–1886, 1886-1889 and 1889–1892, he was elected to the Public Charity Council of Łęczyca County.

He initiated gymnastic exercises for a large group of children and teenagers. Przanowski denoted himself that the reason behind the initiative was “out of concern for the physical development of the young generation”.

In March 1906, Przanowski was appointed as a member of the board of the Music and Drama Society in Łęczyca, which he conjointly had founded.

He collaborated with the editorial office of the Geographical Dictionary of the Kingdom of Poland and other Slavic countries - a work initiated by Filip Sulimierski, Przanowski's friend from the Junior High School in Piotrków (Present: Bolesław I the Brave High School in Piotrków Trybunalski) and the Warsaw Main School. Przanowski was mentioned among those declaring help in providing materials about individual cities and settlements.

=== Private sector ===
After retirement, he moved to Warsaw and in 1912, was appointed as a board member of the II Credit Union in Warsaw, located at 14 Erywańska Street. The II Credit Union in Warsaw provided financial services and managed over 2 000 members assets.

=== Late life ===
Edward Przanowski lived with his son Jan Przanowski in Walewice near Góra Kalwaria, and from 1924 in Nowa Wieś near Starogard Gdański with his son Stefan Przanowski. Edward Przanowski died on February 6, 1929, in Nowa Wieś near Starogard Gdański and was buried in the parish cemetery in Starogard Gdański, with military honors of the 2nd Regiment of Rokitnian Light Cavalry (Polish: 2 Pułk Szwoleżerów Rokitniańskich). In the 1980s, thanks to the efforts of the Society of Lovers of the Kociewie Land (Polish: Towarzystwa Miłośników Ziemi Kociewskiej), the destroyed tomb of Przanowski was restored; in 1984, a commemorative plaque was unveiled in Nowa Wieś, and a street was named after him in Starogard Gdański.

== Bibliography ==
- Polski słownik biograficzny, tom 28, s. 637-638 (author biogramu: Ryszard Szwoch) biogram w iPSB
- Słownik biograficzny techników polskich, tom 14. Warszawa 2003, s. 108-110 (author biogramu: Marek Wasiak);
- „Wychowanie Fizyczne i Sport” 1987 nr 2, s. 92 (author biogramu: Ryszard Szwoch).
