= Bisztynek-Kolonia =

- Village
- Location within Poland
- Coordinates: 54°05′50″N 20°53′28″E
- Country: Poland
- Voivodeship: Warmian-Masurian
- County: Bartoszyce
- Gmina: Bisztynek

Bisztynek-Kolonia [biʂˈtɨnɛk kɔˈlɔɲa] is a village in the administrative district of Gmina Bisztynek, within Bartoszyce County, Warmian-Masurian Voivodeship, in northern Poland.
