= Grzęda, Warmian-Masurian Voivodeship =

Grzęda
- Village
- Location within Poland
- Coordinates: 54°07′12″N 21°00′40″E
- Country: Poland
- Voivodeship: Warmian-Masurian
- County: Bartoszyce
- Gmina: Bisztynek

Grzęda [ˈɡʐɛnda] is a village in the administrative district of Gmina Bisztynek, within Bartoszyce County, Warmian-Masurian Voivodeship, in northern Poland.
