= Krzewina, Warmian-Masurian Voivodeship =

Krzewina
- Village
- Location within Poland
- Coordinates: 54°4′N 20°52′E
- Country: Poland
- Voivodeship: Warmian-Masurian
- County: Bartoszyce
- Gmina: Bisztynek

Krzewina [kʂɛˈvina] is a village in the administrative district of Gmina Bisztynek, within Bartoszyce County, Warmian-Masurian Voivodeship, in northern Poland.
