= Biegonity =

- Settlement
- Location within Poland
- Coordinates: 54°5′N 20°49′E
- Country: Poland
- Voivodeship: Warmian-Masurian
- County: Bartoszyce
- Gmina: Bisztynek

Biegonity [bjɛɡɔˈnitɨ] is a settlement in the administrative district of Gmina Bisztynek, within Bartoszyce County, Warmian-Masurian Voivodeship, in northern Poland.
