= Swędrówka =

- Village
- Location within Poland
- Coordinates: 54°8′17″N 21°0′30″E
- Country: Poland
- Voivodeship: Warmian-Masurian
- County: Bartoszyce
- Gmina: Bisztynek
- Population: 20

Swędrówka (Polish: [sfɛnˈdrufka]) is a village in the administrative district of Gmina Bisztynek, within Bartoszyce County, Warmian-Masurian Voivodeship, in northern Poland.
