= Common court (Poland) =

In Poland, the common courts (Polish: sądy powszechne), according to article 177 of the Constitution, are the courts of general jurisdiction, i.e. they rule on all cases in which the jurisdiction has not been explicitly transferred to other courts. This includes a broad range of cases, including civil, criminal, labour, economic and insurance law. The other types of courts recognised in Poland are administrative courts and military courts. The territorial jurisdiction of these courts and their creation is regulated by the minister of justice.

Poland has a three-tier system of common courts. Most of the cases land in one of 319 regional courts (Polish: sądy rejonowe), whose rulings may be appealed to 47 district courts (sądy okręgowe). (Note: Translating the names of the two lowest instances of Polish common courts into English may cause problems, because the designations used internationally, such as by the European Union, as well as by some government agencies like Statistics Poland, may be used by the Polish Ministry of Justice (MoJ) in an exactly opposite sense, creating confusion. All further references to the courts in this article will feature the translations as provided by the MoJ, or the Polish names in italics.) The latter courts also hear some cases in their original jurisdiction, which tend to be cases where high sums of money are disputed, the ones about serious crimes, and some that deal with narrow subjects, like intellectual property, surveillance, competition law, and personal rights. District court rulings issued in the original jurisdiction may be appealed to an appeal court (sąd apelacyjny); despite the name, the appeal courts will also serve as the courts of original jurisdiction in disciplinary cases against common court judges. After the courts of two instances have reviewed their cases, a cassation or its equivalent may be lodged in the Supreme Court.

Apart from their strictly judicial duties, the common courts in Poland maintain several registries. The National Court Register (Krajowy Rejestr Sądowy) maintains information about most companies in Poland; other such databases include the land and mortgage registry, the register of press outlets, the register of political parties, the register of pension and investment funds, the registry of ships, and the register of pledges.

== Sąd rejonowy ==
A map of Polish courts (as of 2021), with those of the same hue belonging to the same district court, and a group of those being of roughly the same colour belonging to an appeal court (Note: The map does not feature regional court splits in Poznań, Wrocław, Gdańsk, Szczecin, Katowice and Lublin. The former two cities have three of them, the rest have two courts each.)

A sąd rejonowy, translated by the Ministry of Justice into regional court, or, by some other organisations, into district court, is the default trial court. Other courts only take up cases in the original jurisdiction if a specific provision of law provides for it. According to the Statistical Yearbook of the Republic of Poland, out of about 14,855,000 cases solved in Poland in 2023, about 13,766,900 originated in these courts.

As of 3 July 2025, there 319 such courts, each normally spanning several gminas; however, some large cities, like Warsaw, Kraków, Łódź, Wrocław, Poznań, Gdańsk, Szczecin, Lublin and Katowice, are split between two or more such courts. The minister of justice may create a local branch division of a sąd rejonowy located in a town other than the main seat of the court. It may have some or all divisions mirroring those operating in the main seat, but all locations are supported by a single administrative apparatus.

All such courts hear trials in at least three divisions: a civil one (wydział cywilny), a criminal one (wydział karny) and that for family matters and minors (wydział rodzinny i nieletnich). The courts based in the cities which at the same time host a sąd okręgowy or are a city with powiat rights also include an economic division (wydział gospodarczy); and in most cases also a labour and social insurance division (wydział pracy i ubezpieczeń społecznych). If a dispute (e.g. between companies or parties to a work contract) occurs within the jurisdiction of a court without the relevant chamber, the case must be tried in the nearest court that includes it, which often is the seat of the sąd okręgowy. Some courts may also create an enforcement division (wydział egzekucyjny), dealing mostly with asset seizures in order to cover civil liabilities. Additionally, one of the Lublin's two trial courts operates a nationwide civil division that handles electronic writs of payment (elektroniczne postępowanie upominawcze) in a simplified procedure, for any amount.

Most regional courts also have real estate registry divisions (wydział ksiąg wieczystych), which record land titles, ownership of buildings and associated transactions. 21 courts in largest cities additionally operate 27 (duplicate in the cases of the busiest courts) economic divisions designated specifically for maintaining the National Court Register (Krajowy Rejestr Sądowy), which is the company register for all companies except those formed under sole proprietorship.

11 courts (serving the cities where appeal courts are located) also maintain a further economic division for operating the Register of Pledges, which contains entries on most pledges and liens on objects other than real estate. The Register of Pledges does not cover ship mortgages and maritime liens, listed in the court-maintained Registry of Ships, or tax liens, which has a dedicated register operated by the National Revenue Administration.

== Sąd okręgowy ==
A sąd okręgowy, also translated inconsistently, with variants including circuit, provincial or regional court (the Polish MoJ translates the name into district court), is higher in the hierarchy of the common courts compared to the sąd rejonowy. There are currently 47 district courts, located mainly in larger cities. Warsaw and the surrounding metropolitan area is split between two district courts (the Warsaw district court and the Warsaw-Praga district court, covering areas on the right bank of the Vistula). In 2023, they heard an estimated 959,600 cases.

The district court serves both as a court of original jurisdiction and appellate jurisdiction. As an appellate court, it hears appeals from the sąd rejonowy courts within its territory (known as okręg). There is also a specified catalogue of cases where the court has original jurisdiction, as determined by law. As a rule of thumb, these will tend to be cases with high sums at stake, those about serious crimes, and those about intellectual property and personal rights. Some of the items are listed below:

- lawsuits where the sum of disputes exceeds 100,000 PLN, with some exceptions (article 17 section 4 of the Code of Civil Procedure, KPC). The calculation of the sum at dispute depends on the type of case being processed.
- lawsuits concerning personal rights (e.g. personality rights, right to privacy, defamation, freedom of conscience cases, etc.), except for parenthood and adoption cases (article 17 section 1 of KPC)
- press law lawsuits (article 17 section 1 of KPC);
- complaints challenging the split of a cooperative, or the legal effect of resolutions of legal persons (article 17 sections 4^{1-2} of KPC)
- applications claiming damages for suffering losses due to non-appealable court verdicts that are unlawful (article 17 sections 4^{4} of KPC);
- trials for serious crimes, as specified in article 25 section 1 of the Code of Criminal Procedure (KPK);
- civil lawsuits referred from a sąd rejonowy for trial in a district court (may be remanded back with justification; article 18 of KPC)
- criminal prosecutions that would have normally been processed in a sąd rejonowy but which an appeal court transferred to a sąd okręgowy (article 25 section 2 of KPK).

The district courts always include a criminal and a civil division, as well as a labour and social insurance division; some may additionally have a commercial division as well as an inspection division (wydział wizytacyjny). The latter is tasked with administrative oversight and auditing of the subordinate courts. There may also be a penitentiary division for cases related to prisons, an execution division with similar roles to the enforcement division of a sąd rejonowy, and others according to the court's needs as determined by the minister of justice. The district courts will often feature separate appellate sections or, in the case of smaller courts, appeal panels within the sections. District courts issue European arrest warrants (article 607a of KPK) and maintain a list of court experts for the district. The district courts also maintain the registry of press outlets, which is obligatory for most media publications; the one in Warsaw also has the register of political parties and the register for investment funds and pension funds.

Select district courts will handle cases in specialised domains. Intellectual property lawsuits, on the basis of article 479^{90} of KPC, are heard in five district courts, with the most complicated cases heard exclusively in Warsaw. Appeals from several regulators in competition law, as well appeals against the decisions of the National Appeals Chamber (a quasi-judicial public procurement arbiter) are also processed in the district court in Warsaw. The Warsaw district court additionally reviews requests for surveillance warrants of telecommunications, postal or Internet data that come from the central government security agencies, such as ABW or CBA. The Szczecin and Gdańsk district courts have affiliated quasi-judicial bodies named maritime chambers (in Szczecin and in Gdynia, respectively), and the latter court features an appellate maritime chamber.

== Sąd apelacyjny ==
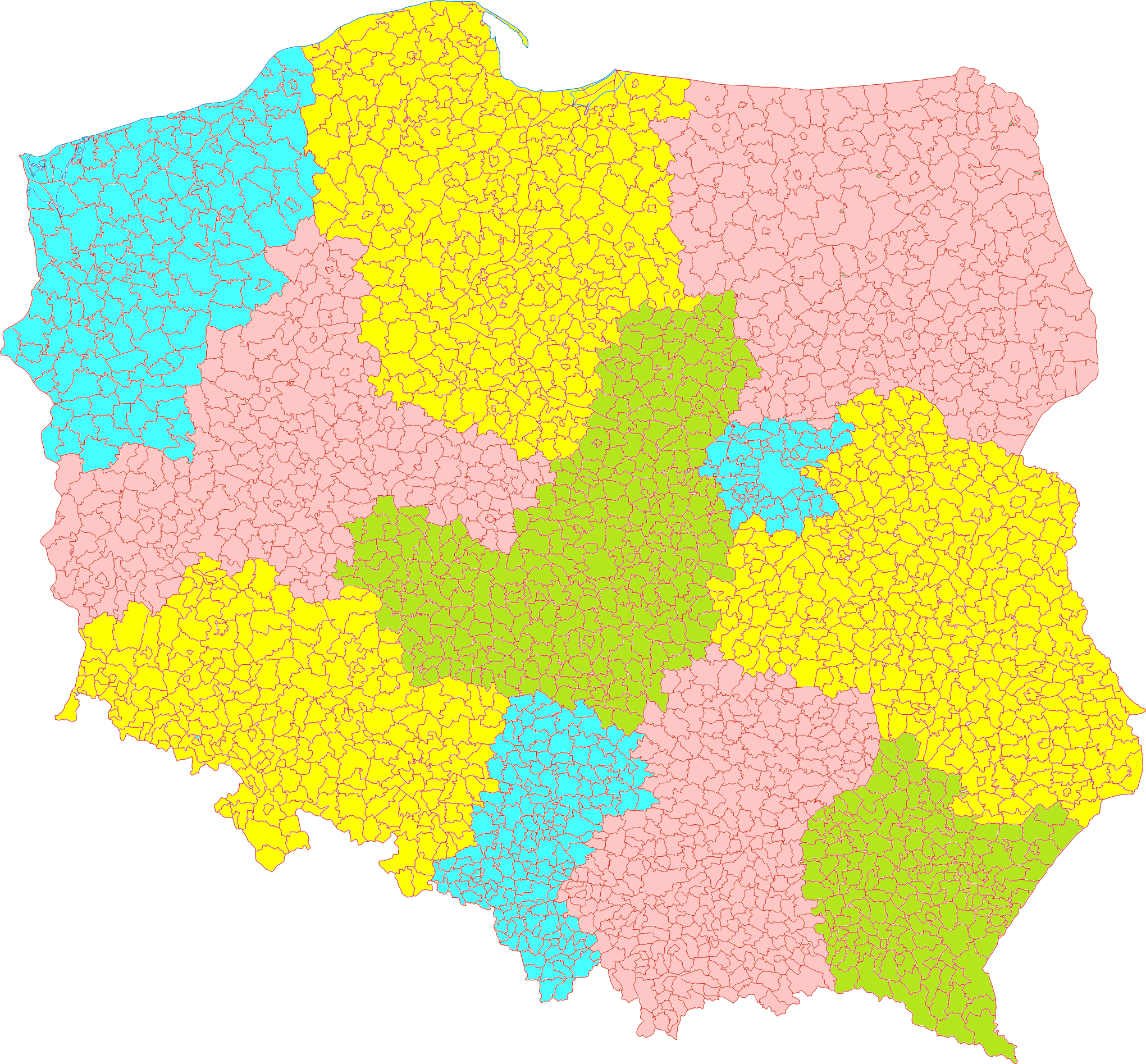
Appeal court division as of 2017

Sąd apelacyjny (translated as appeal court by the Ministry of Justice), as the name suggests, primarily functions in appellate jurisdiction. These 11 courts hear appeals from rulings made by a sąd okręgowy in its original jurisdiction; additionally, they hear requests to cancel a decision of a Polish arbitration court (article 1208 of KPC). and generally review appeals from rulings of quasi-judicial bodies of some statutory professional regulatory colleges of the so-called self-regulating professions, unless these by law are subject to cassation to the Supreme Court. Each appeal court also has an affiliated disciplinary court hearing in the first instance the majority of charges against common court justices. Its verdicts can be appealed to the Chamber of Professional Responsibility the Supreme Court, with the exception the gravest cases, heard both in first and in second instance by that Supreme Court chamber.

Three divisions are normally formed within these courts: the criminal division, the labour and social insurance division and the civil division. The latter also hears appeals from verdicts in family, economic law and intellectual property lawsuits. An inspection chamber may also be formed for auditing and oversight of the subordinate courts within the appeal court's jurisdiction (known as apelacja, not to be confused with another meaning of this word, namely, an appeal). The court is tasked with making a budget of all the courts within its jurisdiction and control the expenditures of the district and regional courts.
