= Janowiec, Warmian-Masurian Voivodeship =

Janowiec
- Village
- Location within Poland
- Coordinates: 54°07′38″N 21°00′24″E
- Country: Poland
- Voivodeship: Warmian-Masurian
- County: Bartoszyce
- Gmina: Bisztynek

Janowiec [jaˈnɔvjɛt͡s] is a village in the administrative district of Gmina Bisztynek, within Bartoszyce County, Warmian-Masurian Voivodeship, in northern Poland.

Before 1772 the area was part of Kingdom of Poland, and in 1772–1945 it belonged to Prussia and Germany (East Prussia).
