= Pleśno, Bartoszyce County =

Pleśno
- Village
- Location within Poland
- Coordinates: 54°7′N 21°3′E
- Country: Poland
- Voivodeship: Warmian-Masurian
- County: Bartoszyce
- Gmina: Bisztynek

Pleśno ([ˈplɛɕnɔ]; German: Plößen) is a village in the administrative district of Gmina Bisztynek, within Bartoszyce County, Warmian-Masurian Voivodeship, in northern Poland.
