= Winiec, Bartoszyce County =

Winiec
- Settlement
- Location within Poland
- Coordinates: 54°05′22″N 20°50′38″E
- Country: Poland
- Voivodeship: Warmian-Masurian
- County: Bartoszyce
- Gmina: Bisztynek

Winiec [ˈviɲɛt͡s] is a village in the administrative district of Gmina Bisztynek, within Bartoszyce County, Warmian-Masurian Voivodeship, in northern Poland.

Before the First partition of Poland the area was part of the Kingdom of Poland, and in 1772–1945 it belonged to Prussia and Germany (East Prussia).
