= Aleksander Dzierzbicki =

Aleksander Dzierzbicki was a Polish szlachcic (nobleman), a chorąży of Inowłódz (chorąży inowłodzki) (1752–1759), a chorąży mniejszy łęczycki (1759), a chorąży większy łęczycki (1759–1763) and a castellan of Brzeziny (kasztelan brzeziński) (1763–1767).

He was son of Marcin Dzierzbicki, a podczaszy of Łęczyca (podczaszy łęczycki).
