= Nisko, Warmian-Masurian Voivodeship =

Nisko
- Village
- Location within Poland
- Coordinates: 54°3′53″N 21°3′6″E
- Country: Poland
- Voivodeship: Warmian-Masurian
- County: Bartoszyce
- Gmina: Bisztynek
- Population: 100

Nisko [ˈniskɔ] is a village in the administrative district of Gmina Bisztynek, within Bartoszyce County, Warmian-Masurian Voivodeship, in northern Poland.

Before 1772 the area was part of Kingdom of Poland, and in 1772–1945 it belonged to Prussia and Germany (East Prussia).
