= Niski Młyn =

- Settlement
- Location within Poland
- Coordinates: 54°03′52″N 21°03′04″E
- Country: Poland
- Voivodeship: Warmian-Masurian
- County: Bartoszyce
- Gmina: Bisztynek

Niski Młyn [ˈniski ˈmwɨn] is a settlement in the administrative district of Gmina Bisztynek, within Bartoszyce County, Warmian-Masurian Voivodeship, in northern Poland.
