= Pleśnik =

- Village
- Location within Poland
- Coordinates: 54°5′30″N 21°4′20″E
- Country: Poland
- Voivodeship: Warmian-Masurian
- County: Bartoszyce
- Gmina: Bisztynek
- Population: 92

Pleśnik [ˈplɛɕnik] is a village in the administrative district of Gmina Bisztynek, within Bartoszyce County, Warmian-Masurian Voivodeship, in northern Poland.
