= Troksy =

- Village
- Location within Poland
- Coordinates: 54°03′28″N 21°03′49″E
- Country: Poland
- Voivodeship: Warmian-Masurian
- County: Bartoszyce
- Gmina: Bisztynek

Troksy [ˈtrɔksɨ] is a village in the administrative district of Gmina Bisztynek, within Bartoszyce County, Warmian-Masurian Voivodeship, in northern Poland.
