= Dąbrowa, Gmina Bisztynek =

Dąbrowa
- Village
- Location within Poland
- Coordinates: 54°02′57″N 20°55′53″E
- Country: Poland
- Voivodeship: Warmian-Masurian
- County: Bartoszyce
- Gmina: Bisztynek

Dąbrowa [dɔmˈbrɔva] is a village in the administrative district of Gmina Bisztynek, within Bartoszyce County, Warmian-Masurian Voivodeship, in northern Poland.

Before 1772 the area was part of Kingdom of Poland, and in 1772–1945 it belonged to Prussia and Germany (East Prussia).
