= Kepínski (crater) =

Crater on the Moon

- Coordinates: 28.8°N 126.6°E
- Diameter: 31 km
- Depth: Unknown
- Colongitude: 234° at sunrise
- Eponym: Felicjan Kępiński

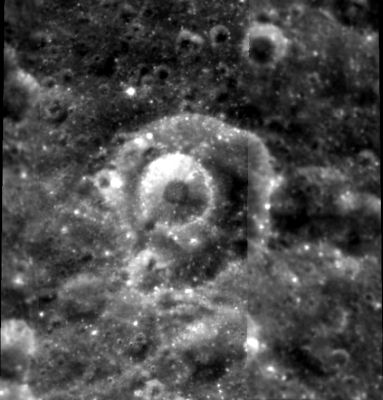
Kepínski lunar crater

Kepinski is a lunar impact crater on the Moon's far side. It lies to the northwest of the larger crater Vernadskiy, and northeast of Meggers. Its name comes from Polish astronomer Felicjan Kępiński.

Kepinski has an outer rim that is marginally eroded due to subsequent impacts, especially along the southwest side. The inner walls are relatively featureless, sloping down to the interior. The floor is prominently occupied by a concentric, bowl-shaped crater. This feature is offset slightly to the northwest of Kepinski's midpoint. The diameter of this concentric feature is less than half that of Kepinski, although it also has a small outer rampart.

== Satellite craters ==
By convention these features are identified on lunar maps by placing the letter on the side of the crater midpoint that is closest to Kepinski.

Kepinski	Latitude	Longitude	Diameter
C	30.2° N	128.0° E	20 km
N	26.6° N	126.2° E	40 km
W	30.1° N	124.9° E	25 km
