= Gmina Bisztynek =

Gmina Bisztynek Bisztynek Commune
- Gmina
- Coat of arms
- Interactive map of Gmina Bisztynek
- Coordinates (Bisztynek): 54°4′N 20°54′E
- Country: Poland
- Voivodeship: Warmian-Masurian
- County: Bartoszyce
- Seat: Bisztynek

Area
  - Total: 203.55 km^{2} (78.59 sq mi)

Population (2006)
  - Total: 6,749
  - Density: 33.16/km^{2} (85.87/sq mi)
  - Urban: 2,493
  - Rural: 4,256

Gmina Bisztynek is an urban-rural gmina (administrative district) in Bartoszyce County, Warmian-Masurian Voivodeship, in northern Poland. Its seat is the town of Bisztynek, which lies approximately 22 kilometres (14 mi) south of Bartoszyce and 41 km (25 mi) north-east of the regional capital Olsztyn.

The gmina covers an area of 203.55 square kilometres (78.6 sq mi), and as of 2006 its total population is 6,749, of which the population of Bisztynek is 2,493, and the population of the rural part of the gmina is 4,256.

== Villages ==
Apart from the town of Bisztynek, Gmina Bisztynek contains the villages and settlements of Biegonity, Bisztynek-Kolonia, Dąbrowa, Grzęda, Janowiec, Kokoszewo, Krzewina, Księżno, Łabławki, Lądek, Łędławki, Mołdyty, Niski Młyn, Nisko, Nowa Wieś Reszelska, Paluzy, Pleśnik, Pleśno, Prosity, Sątopy, Sułowo, Swędrówka, Troksy, Troszkowo, Unikowo, Warmiany, Winiec, Wojkowo and Wozławki.

== Neighbouring gminas ==
Gmina Bisztynek is bordered by the gminas of Bartoszyce, Jeziorany, Kiwity, Kolno, Korsze and Reszel.
