= Wozławki =

- Village
- Location within Poland
- Coordinates: 54°7′10″N 20°52′28″E
- Country: Poland
- Voivodeship: Warmian-Masurian
- County: Bartoszyce
- Gmina: Bisztynek

Wozławki [vɔˈzwafki] is a village in the administrative district of Gmina Bisztynek, within Bartoszyce County, Warmian-Masurian Voivodeship, in northern Poland.

Before 1772 the area was part of Kingdom of Poland, 1772–1945 Prussia and Germany (East Prussia).
