= Mołdyty =

- Village
- Location within Poland
- Coordinates: 54°02′38″N 21°03′38″E
- Country: Poland
- Voivodeship: Warmian-Masurian
- County: Bartoszyce
- Gmina: Bisztynek

Mołdyty [mɔu̯ˈdɨtɨ] is a village in the administrative district of Gmina Bisztynek, within Bartoszyce County, Warmian-Masurian Voivodeship, in northern Poland.
