= Unikowo, Warmian-Masurian Voivodeship =

Unikowo
- Village
- Location within Poland
- Coordinates: 54°2′54″N 20°59′14″E
- Country: Poland
- Voivodeship: Warmian-Masurian
- County: Bartoszyce
- Gmina: Bisztynek
- Population: 620
- Website: http://www.unikowo.tk

Unikowo [uniˈkɔvɔ] is a village in the administrative district of Gmina Bisztynek, within Bartoszyce County, Warmian-Masurian Voivodeship, in northern Poland.
