= Sułowo, Warmian-Masurian Voivodeship =

Sułowo
- Village
- Location within Poland
- Coordinates: 54°05′48″N 20°49′40″E
- Country: Poland
- Voivodeship: Warmian-Masurian
- County: Bartoszyce
- Gmina: Bisztynek

Sułowo [suˈwɔvɔ] is a village in the administrative district of Gmina Bisztynek, within Bartoszyce County, Warmian-Masurian Voivodeship, in northern Poland.

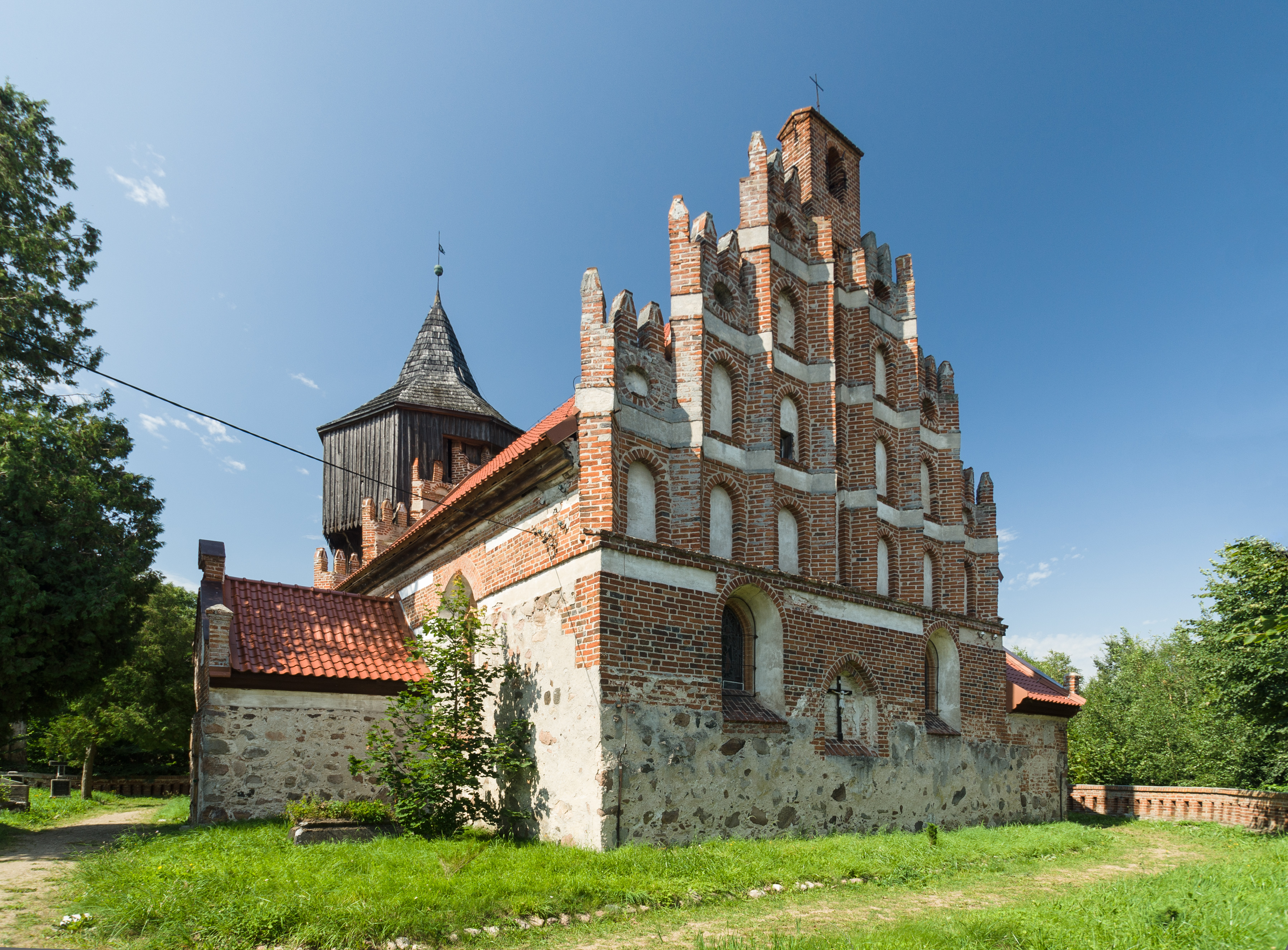
Church of the Exaltation of the Holy Cross in Sułowo
