= Resursa Obywatelska Palace =

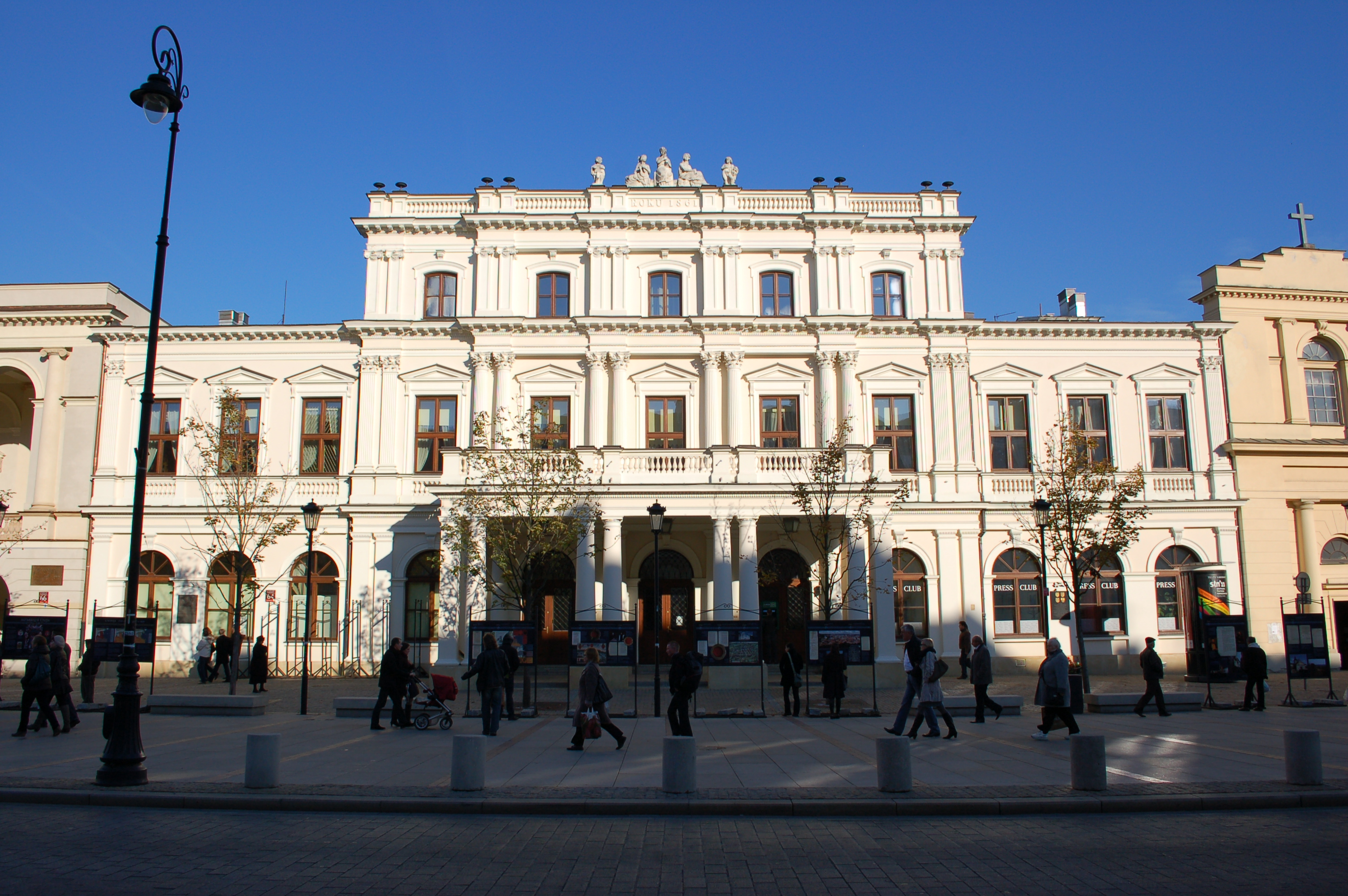
- Resursa Obywatelska Palace

- Location of Resursa Obywatelska Palace in Poland
- 52°14′43″N 21°00′52″E
- Location: Warsaw, Masovian Voivodeship; in Poland

History
- Built: 1861

Site notes
- Architect: Edward Cichocki
- Architectural style: Eclecticist

Historic Monument of Poland
- Designated: 1994-09-08
- Part of: Warsaw – historic city center with the Royal Route and Wilanów
- Reference no.: M.P. 1994 nr 50 poz. 423

Resursa Obywatelska Palace (Polish: Resursa Obywatelska) is a historical building, located by Krakowskie Przedmieście in Warsaw, Poland.

The palace was designed by architect Edward Cichocki and built by Leon Karasiński between 1860 and 1861. Between 1861 and 1939 the building was home to the Merchant's Resource Association (Resursa Obywatelska). Since World War II the building houses the Society for Communication with the Polish Diaspora "Polonia" (Towarzystwo Łączności z Polonią Zagraniczną "Polonia").

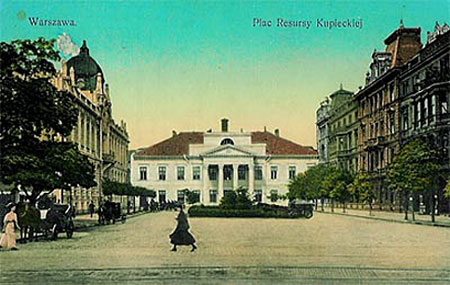
Former palace of the Merchant's Resource Association

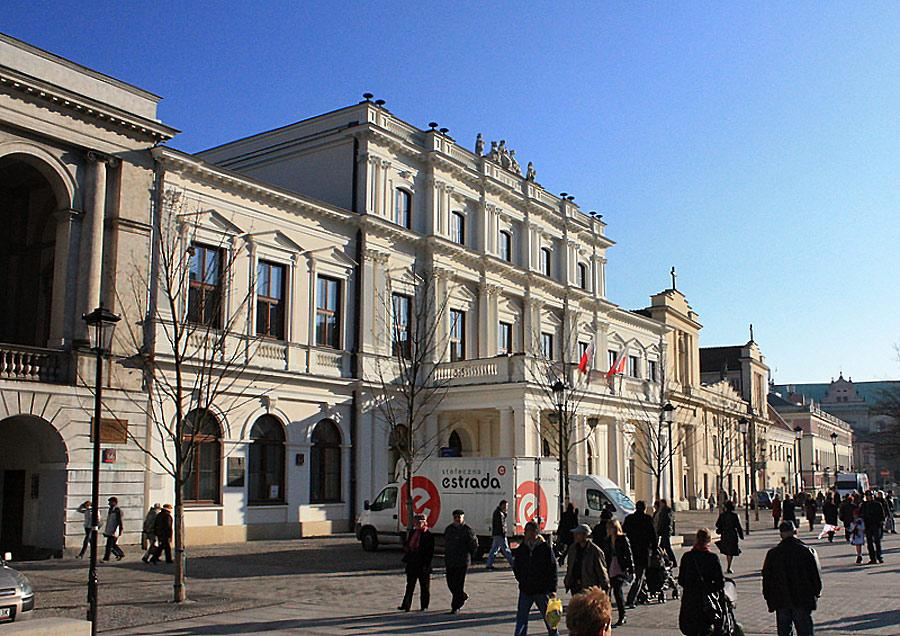
Side with of "Polonia" House

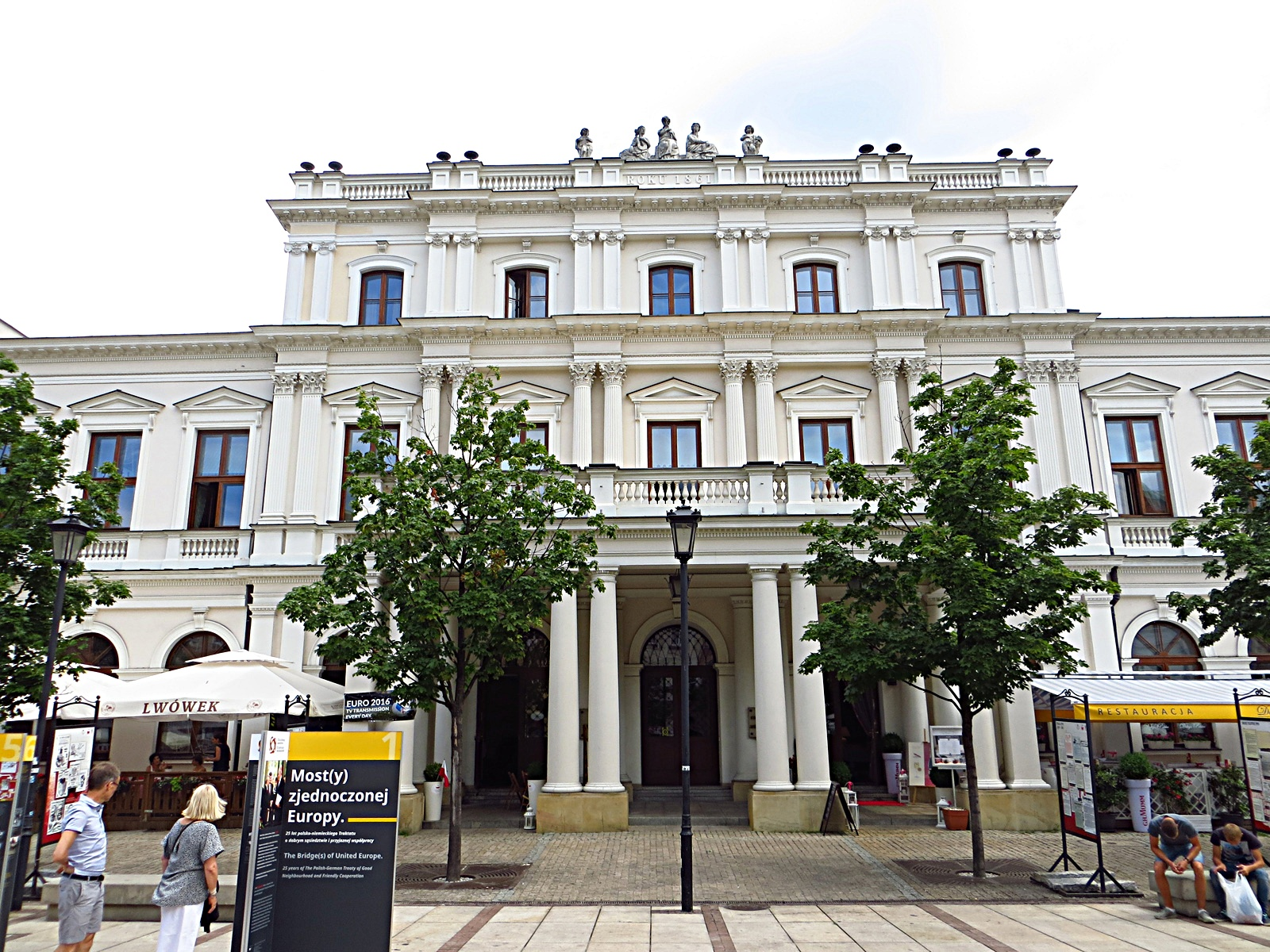
Façade of "Polonia" House
