= Przanowice =

- Village
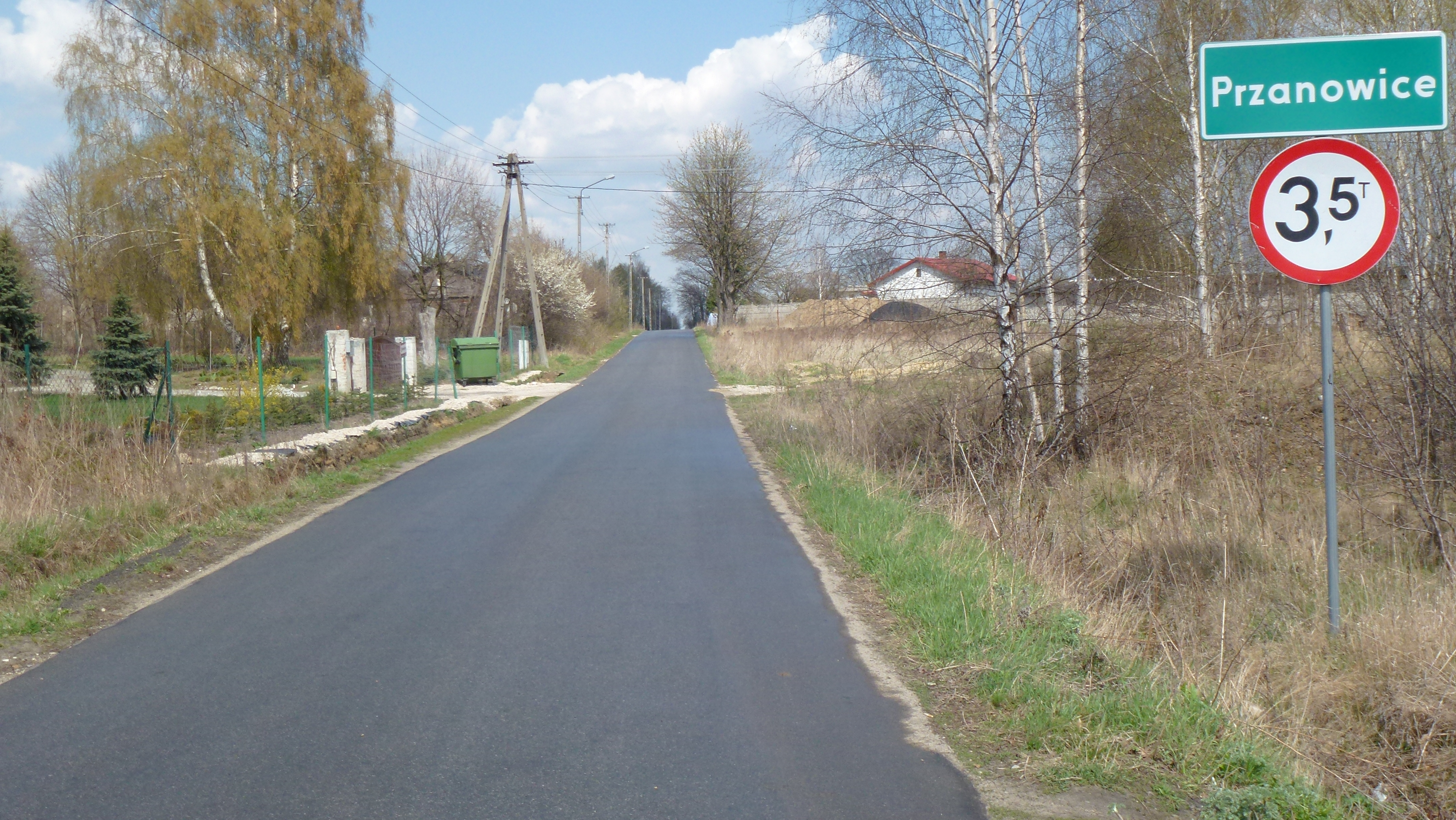

- Location within Poland
- Coordinates: 51°44′N 19°46′E
- Country: Poland
- Voivodeship: Łódź
- County: Łódź East
- Gmina: Koluszki

Przanowice [pʂanɔˈvit͡sɛ] is a village in the administrative district of Gmina Koluszki, within Łódź East County, Łódź Voivodeship, in central Poland.
