= Chorąży of Inowłódz =

Chorąży of Inowłódz (Polish: chorąży inowłodzki) was an honorary office in a land in the Polish–Lithuanian Commonwealth. It was created in 1726.

Clerical hierarchy for a powiat of Inowłódz was created in 1726. Scholars considers that in a reality it was an addition for a relict castellany of Inowłódz.

In 1793 the voivodeship of Łęczyca with the powiat of Inowłódz was annexed by Prussia. With this fact a clerical hierarchy, including a chorąży of Inowłódz, in the powiat of Inowłódz disappeared.

== List of chorąży of Inowłódz ==
#	Name	Assumed office	Left office
1	Tomasz Grabski	27 March 1727	3 March 1731
2	Stefan Łętkowski	3 March 1731	between 25 August 1734 and 25 May 1735
3	Stefan Jastrzębowski	26 May 1735	between 23 July 1750 and 31 January 1751
4	Aleksander Dzierzbicki	6 June 1752	13 September 1759
5	Wojciech Bardziński	13 September 1759	30 October 1759
6	Szymon Dzierzbiski	30 October 1759	20 April 1763
7	Jan Ignacy Sariusz Stokowski	23 April 1763	before 7 November 1779
8	Franciszek Pokrzywnicki	7 November 1779	between 6 November 1784 and 12 December 1784
9	Franciszek Jerzmanowski	13 December 1784	1793
