= Lądek, Warmian-Masurian Voivodeship =

Lądek
- Village
- Location within Poland
- Coordinates: 54°2′52″N 20°50′44″E
- Country: Poland
- Voivodeship: Warmian-Masurian
- County: Bartoszyce
- Gmina: Bisztynek

Lądek [ˈlɔndɛk] is a village in the administrative district of Gmina Bisztynek, within Bartoszyce County, Warmian-Masurian Voivodeship, in northern Poland.

Before 1772 the area was part of Kingdom of Poland, 1772–1945 Prussia and Germany (East Prussia).
