= Bisztynek =

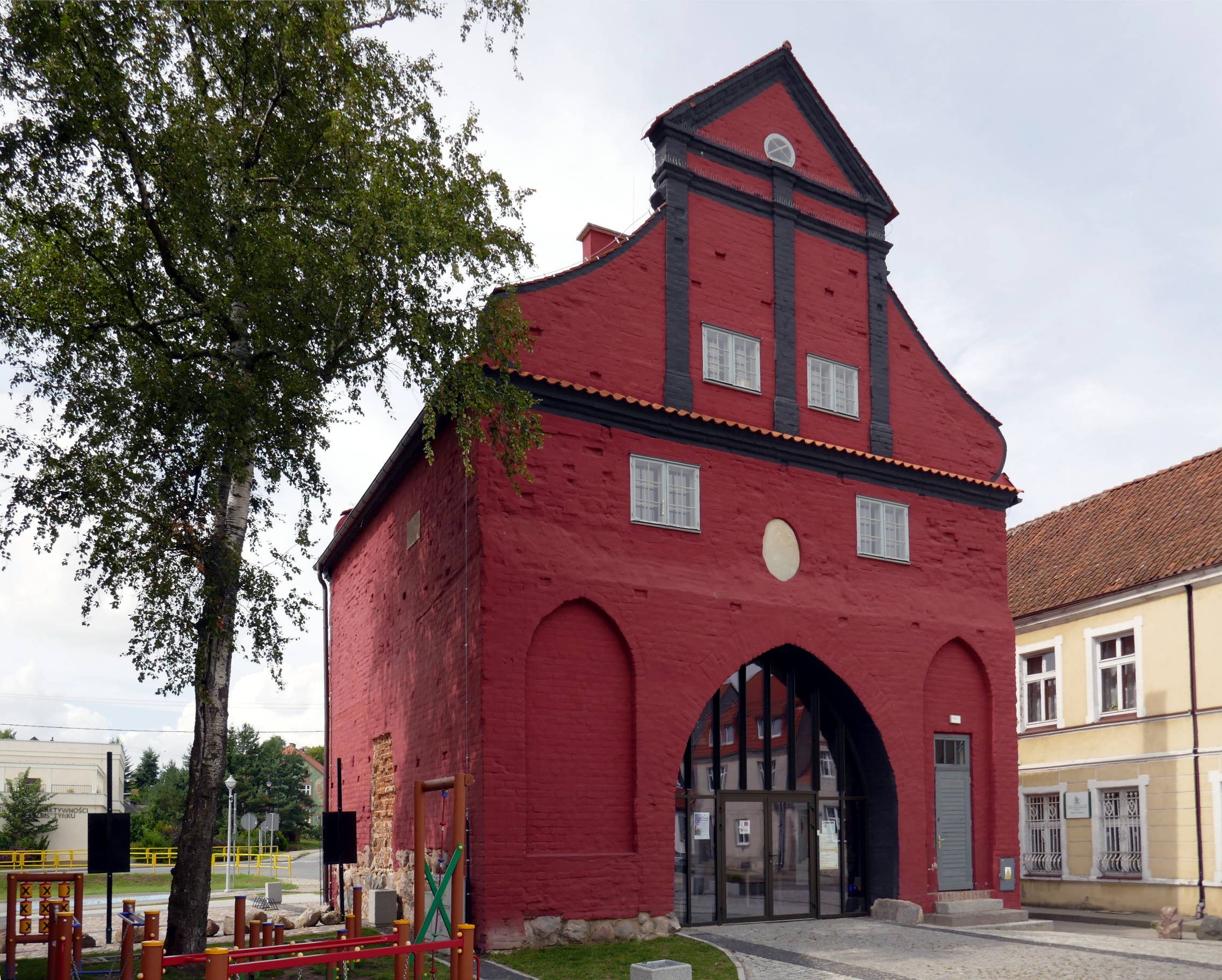
- Lidzbark Gate (Brama Lidzbarska)

- Flag Coat of arms

- Location within Poland
- Coordinates: 54°4′N 20°54′E
- Country: Poland
- Voivodeship: Warmian-Masurian
- County: Bartoszyce
- Gmina: Bisztynek
- Established: 14th century

Government
  - Mayor: Marek Dominiak

Area
  - Total: 2.16 km^{2} (0.83 sq mi)

Population (31 December 2021)
  - Total: 2,282
  - Density: 1,056/km^{2} (2,740/sq mi)
- Time zone: UTC+1 (CET)
  - Summer (DST): UTC+2 (CEST)
- Postal code: 11-230
- Area code: +48 89
- Car plates: NBA
- Website: http://bisztynek.pl/

Bisztynek [bʲiʂˈtɨnɛk] (German: Bischofstein) is a town in Bartoszyce County, Warmian-Masurian Voivodeship, Poland, with 2,282 inhabitants as of December 2021. It is located in the historical region of Warmia.

== History ==
The town was part of Poland until the First Partition of Poland in 1772, when it was annexed by the Kingdom of Prussia, and from 1871 to 1945 it was also part of Germany. As a result of the Treaty of Versailles, the 1920 East Prussian plebiscite, which was completely boycotted by ethnic Poles, was organized on 11 July 1920 under the control of the League of Nations, which resulted in 2,581 votes to remain in Germany and none for Poland.

After Germany's defeat in World War II in 1945, the town was part of the region that became part of Poland under the terms of the Potsdam Agreement.

== Sports ==
The local football team is Reduta Bisztynek, which competes in the lower leagues.

== Gallery ==
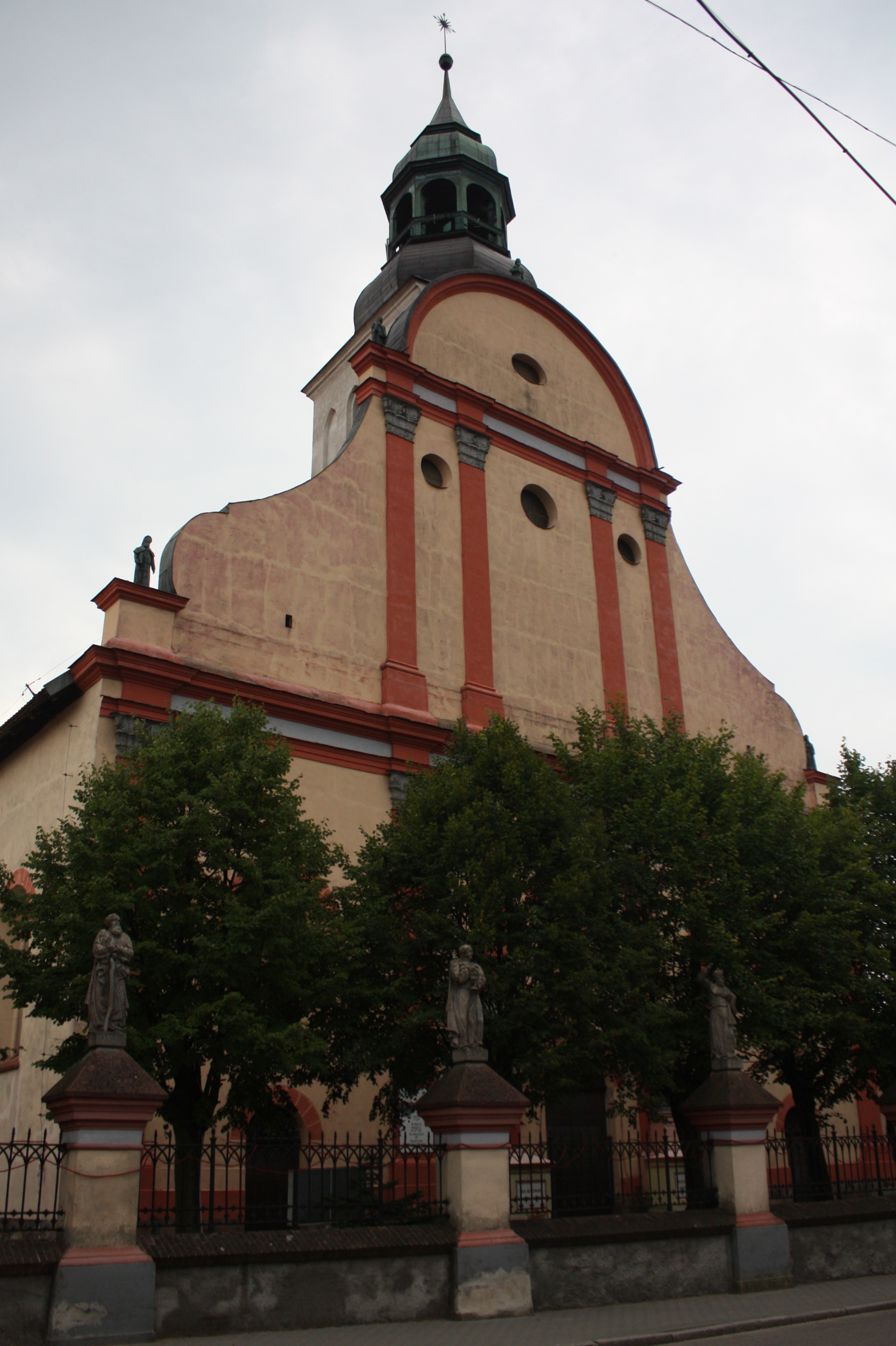
Saint Matthias church (Baroque)

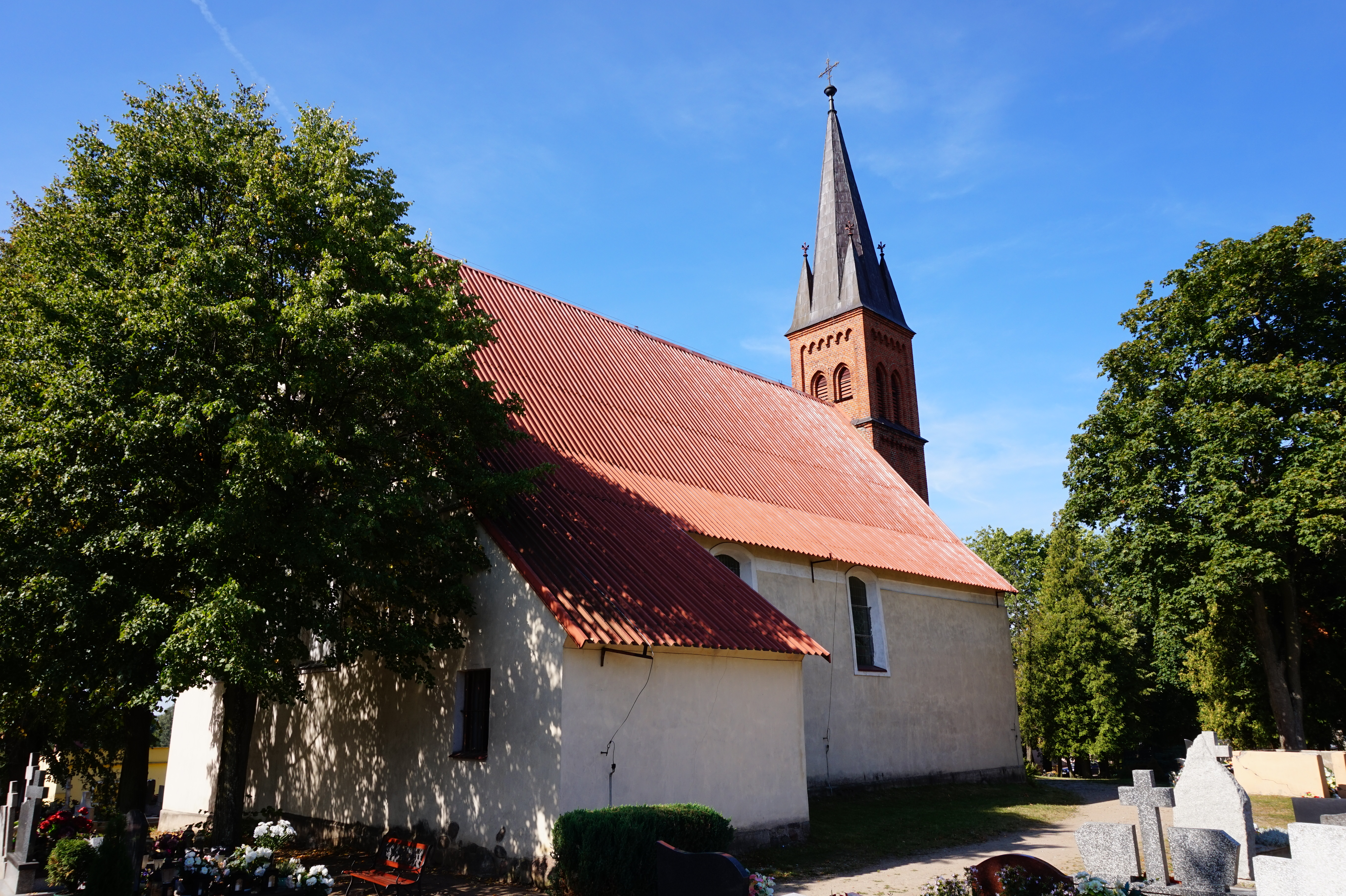
Saint Michael church (Baroque and Gothic Revival)

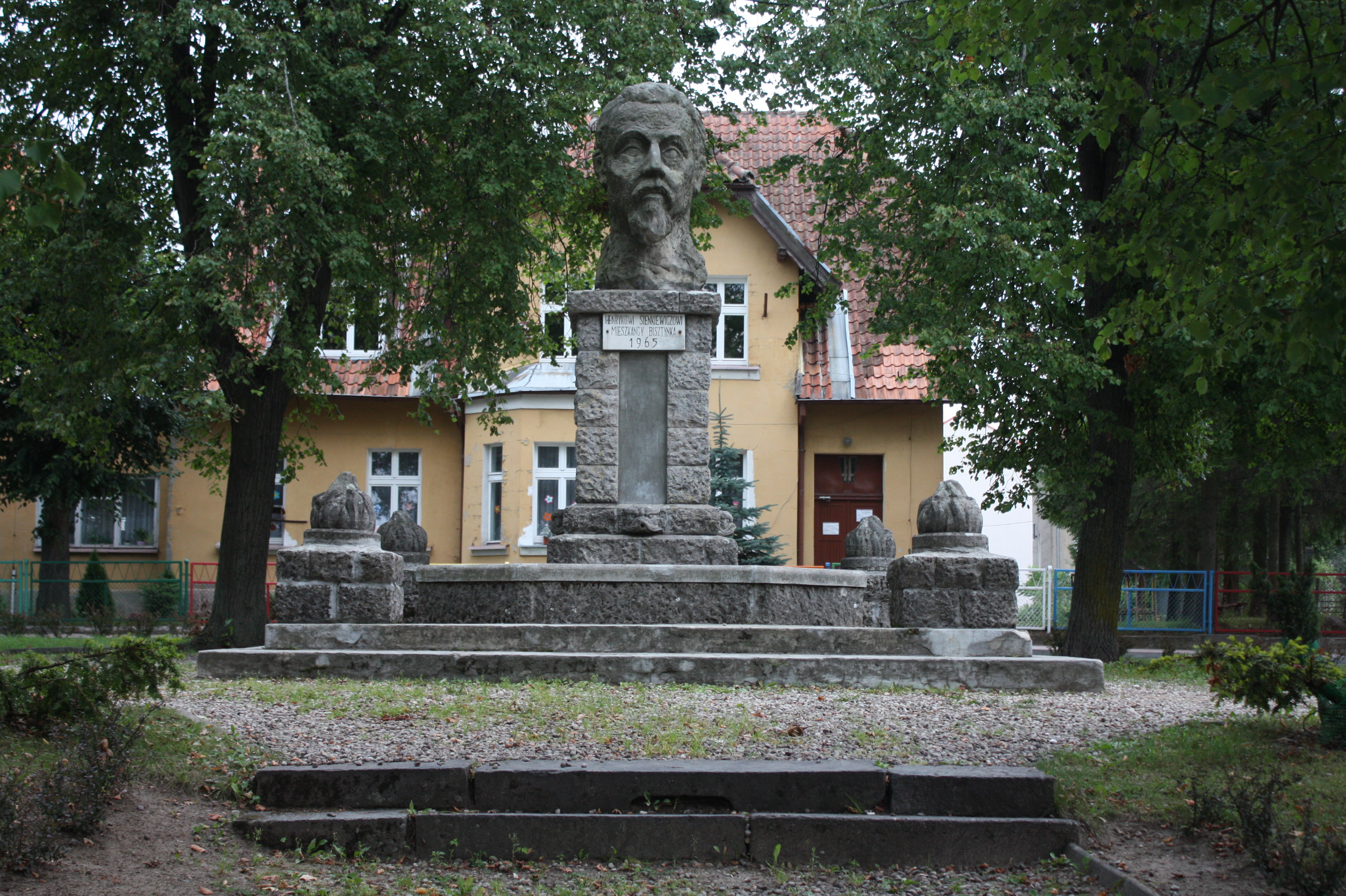
Henryk Sienkiewicz monument
