= Sątopy, Warmian-Masurian Voivodeship =

Sątopy
- Village
- Location within Poland
- Coordinates: 54°3′42″N 21°0′45″E
- Country: Poland
- Voivodeship: Warmian-Masurian
- County: Bartoszyce
- Gmina: Bisztynek
- Population: 210

Sątopy [sɔnˈtɔpɨ] is a village in the administrative district of Gmina Bisztynek, within Bartoszyce County, Warmian-Masurian Voivodeship, in northern Poland.

Before 1772 the area was part of Kingdom of Poland, 1772-1945 Prussia and Germany (East Prussia).
