= Łędławki =

- Village
- Location within Poland
- Coordinates: 54°06′08″N 20°56′36″E
- Country: Poland
- Voivodeship: Warmian-Masurian
- County: Bartoszyce
- Gmina: Bisztynek

Łędławki [wɛnˈdwafki] is a village in the administrative district of Gmina Bisztynek, within Bartoszyce County, Warmian-Masurian Voivodeship, in northern Poland.
