= Warmiany =

- Village
- Location within Poland
- Coordinates: 54°7′N 20°56′E
- Country: Poland
- Voivodeship: Warmian-Masurian
- County: Bartoszyce
- Gmina: Bisztynek

Warmiany [varˈmjanɨ] is a village in the administrative district of Gmina Bisztynek, within Bartoszyce County, Warmian-Masurian Voivodeship, in northern Poland.

With the Second Peace of Thorn in 1466, the area became part of the Kingdom of Poland until 1772; 1772-1945 Kingdom of Prussia and Germany (East Prussia).

When it was part of Germany, the village was known as Schönwalde.
