= Personal rights =

Rights over one's own body

Personal rights are the rights that a person has over their own body. In the Merriam-Webster Dictionary, personal rights are defined as "rights (as of personal security, personal liberty, and private property) appertaining to the person". Among personal rights are associated rights to protect and safeguard the body, most obviously protected by the torts of assault and battery. Furthermore, aspects of personality, such as a person's reputation and honour, are protected by the tort of defamation, legislation protecting the privacy of individuals, and freedom of movement.

In English land law, a personal right (from the Latin ius in personam) refers to the permission to use land for a specific purpose that is personal to the owner and which cannot bind future purchasers of the land. A personal right is thus distinct from a proprietary (property) right (ius in rem) which refers to a right that affects the land itself, such as a freehold or leasehold.

== See also ==
- Personality rights
- Right to die
- Victimless crime
- Self defense
