= Księżno, Bartoszyce County =

Księżno
- Village
- Location within Poland
- Coordinates: 54°3′N 20°50′E
- Country: Poland
- Voivodeship: Warmian-Masurian
- County: Bartoszyce
- Gmina: Bisztynek

Księżno [ˈkɕɛ̃ʐnɔ] is a village in the administrative district of Gmina Bisztynek, within Bartoszyce County, Warmian-Masurian Voivodeship, in northern Poland.
