= Bolesław I the Brave 1st Secondary School in Piotrków Trybunalski =

Catholic high school in Poland

I Liceum Ogólnokształcące im. Bolesława Chrobrego w Piotrkowie Trybunalskim
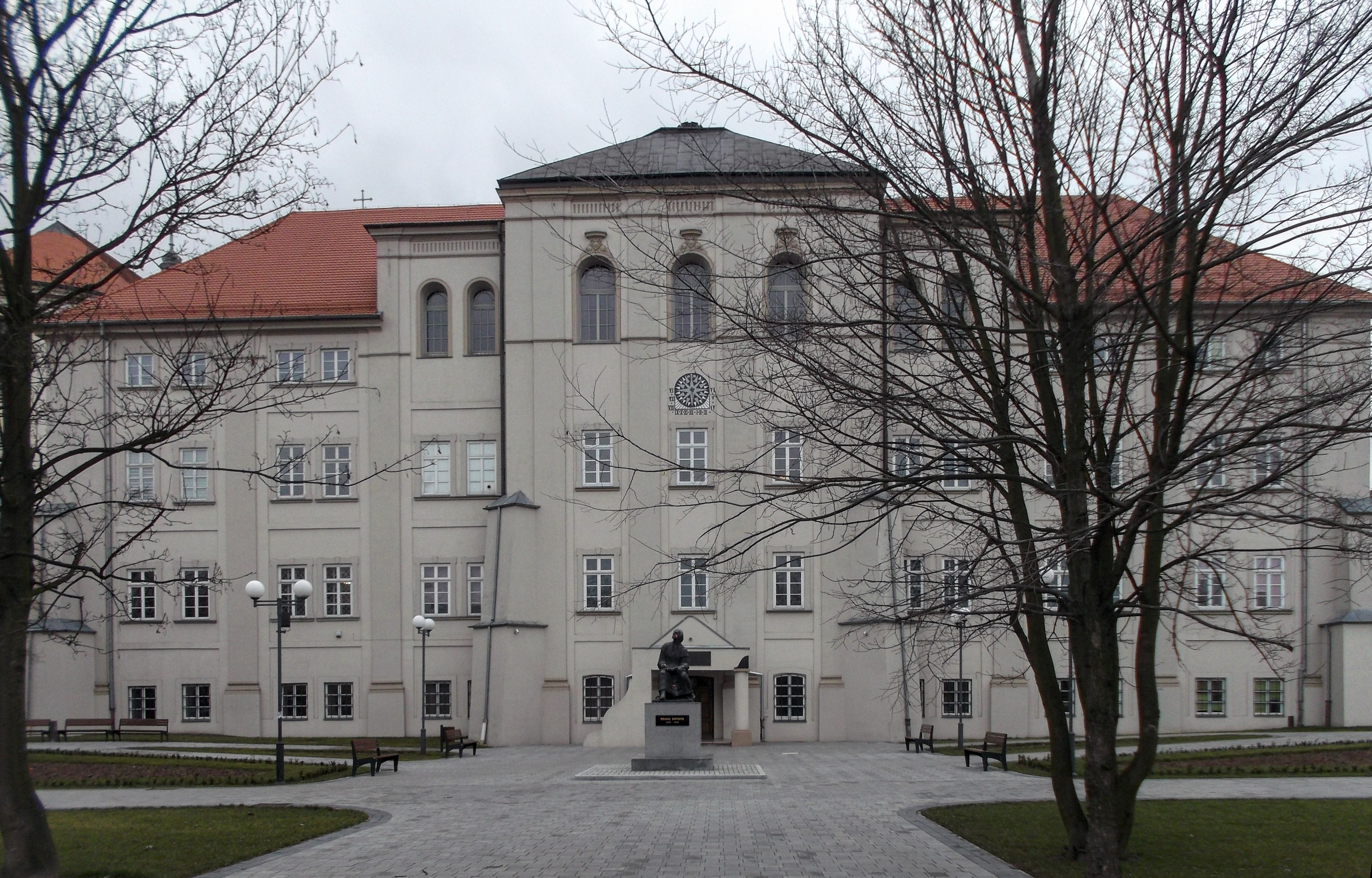

Location
- Piotrków Trybunalski, Poland
- Coordinates: 51°24′N 19°42′E

Information
- Type: Public
- Established: 1675
- Website: www.liceum1.piotrkow.pl/en

Bolesław I the Brave High School in Piotrków Trybunalski (I Liceum Ogólnokształcące im. Bolesława Chrobrego w Piotrkowie Trybunalskim) - a high school in Piotrków Trybunalski. The school continues the tradition of two conventual schools organized by Piarists (1675) and Jesuits (1716).

== Students ==
- Jan Stanisław Jankowski - politician
- Stanisław Konarski - educational reformer
- Zdzisław Najder - writer, chief of the Polish-language section of Radio Free Europe/Radio Liberty
- Marceli Nencki - chemist
- Józef Pawlikowski
- Henryk Struve - philosopher
- Józef Życiński - Roman Catholic bishop
