= Lipica =

Lipica may refer to several places:

== Poland ==
- Lipica, Poland, a village in the Province of Warmia-Masuria

== Serbia ==
- Lipica (Tutin), a village in the Municipality of Tutin

== Slovenia ==
- Lipica (border crossing), a border crossing near Lipica between Slovenia and Italy
- Lipica (hill), a hill (979 m) in Golac in the Municipality of Hrpelje–Kozina
- Lipica (ridge), a ridge (950 m) in Golac in the Municipality of Hrpelje–Kozina
- Lipica, Šentjur, a hamlet of Podgrad in the Municipality of Šentjur
- Lipica, Škofja Loka, a settlement in the Municipality of Škofja Loka
- Lipica, Sežana, a settlement in the Municipality of Sežana and the origin of the Lipizzan horse
