= Wiatrak =

Wiatrak may refer to:

- Wiatrak, Warmian-Masurian Voivodeship, a village in Bartoszyce County, Warmian-Masurian Voivodeship, Poland

== People with the surname ==
- Bill Wiatrak, American actor
- John Wiatrak (1913–2000), American football player
