= Biała Podlaska, Warmian-Masurian Voivodeship =

Biała Podlaska
- Village
- Location within Poland
- Coordinates: 54°14′0″N 20°38′6″E
- Country: Poland
- Voivodeship: Warmian-Masurian
- County: Bartoszyce
- Gmina: Bartoszyce
- Population (2006): 30
- Number Zone: (+48) 89
- Vehicle registration: NBA

Biała Podlaska [ˈbjawa pɔdˈlaska] is a village in the administrative district of Gmina Bartoszyce, within Bartoszyce County, Warmian-Masurian Voivodeship, in northern Poland, close to the border with the Kaliningrad Oblast of Russian Federation.
