= Posłusze =

- Village
- Interactive map of Posłusze
- Location within Poland
- Coordinates: 54°21′30″N 20°47′26″E
- Country: Poland
- Voivodeship: Warmian-Masurian
- County: Bartoszyce
- Gmina: Bartoszyce
- Population: 65

Posłusze [pɔˈswuʂɛ] (German: Poschloschen) is a village in the administrative district of Gmina Bartoszyce, within Bartoszyce County, Warmian-Masurian Voivodeship, in northern Poland, close to the border with the Kaliningrad Oblast of Russia.

The village has a population of 65.
