= Wipławki =

- Village
- Location within Poland
- Coordinates: 54°17′20″N 20°48′48″E
- Country: Poland
- Voivodeship: Warmian-Masurian
- County: Bartoszyce
- Gmina: Bartoszyce
- Population: 70

Wipławki [vʲiˈpwafkʲi] (German: Wieplack) is a village in the administrative district of Gmina Bartoszyce, within Bartoszyce County, Warmian-Masurian Voivodeship, in northern Poland, close to the border with the Kaliningrad Oblast of Russia.

The village has a population of 70.
