= Masuny =

- Village
- Location within Poland
- Coordinates: 54°19′N 21°3′E
- Country: Poland
- Voivodeship: Warmian-Masurian
- County: Bartoszyce
- Gmina: Sępopol

Masuny [maˈsunɨ] is a village in the administrative district of Gmina Sępopol, within Bartoszyce County, Warmian-Masurian Voivodeship, in northern Poland, close to the border with the Kaliningrad Oblast of Russia.

== People ==
- Karl von Gamp-Massaunen (1846-1918), German landowner and politician, member of Reichstag, owner of the Massaunen Estate
- Botho von Gamp-Massaunen (1894-1977), son of Karl, German painter and last private owner of the Massaunen Estate
