= Karolewko, Warmian-Masurian Voivodeship =

Karolewko
- Settlement
- Location within Poland
- Coordinates: 54°18′54″N 20°44′23″E
- Country: Poland
- Voivodeship: Warmian-Masurian
- County: Bartoszyce
- Gmina: Bartoszyce

Karolewko [karɔˈlɛfkɔ] (German: Karolinenhof) is a settlement in the administrative district of Gmina Bartoszyce, within Bartoszyce County, Warmian-Masurian Voivodeship, in northern Poland, close to the border with the Kaliningrad Oblast of Russia.
