= Judyty, Warmian-Masurian Voivodeship =

Judyty
- Village
- Location within Poland
- Coordinates: 54°19′N 20°54′E
- Country: Poland
- Voivodeship: Warmian-Masurian
- County: Bartoszyce
- Gmina: Sępopol

Judyty [juˈdɨtɨ] is a village in the administrative district of Gmina Sępopol, within Bartoszyce County, Warmian-Masurian Voivodeship, in northern Poland, close to the border with the Kaliningrad Oblast of Russia.

== Notable residents ==
- Eberhard von Kuenheim (born 1928), German industrial manager
