= Tolko, Poland =

Tolko
- Village
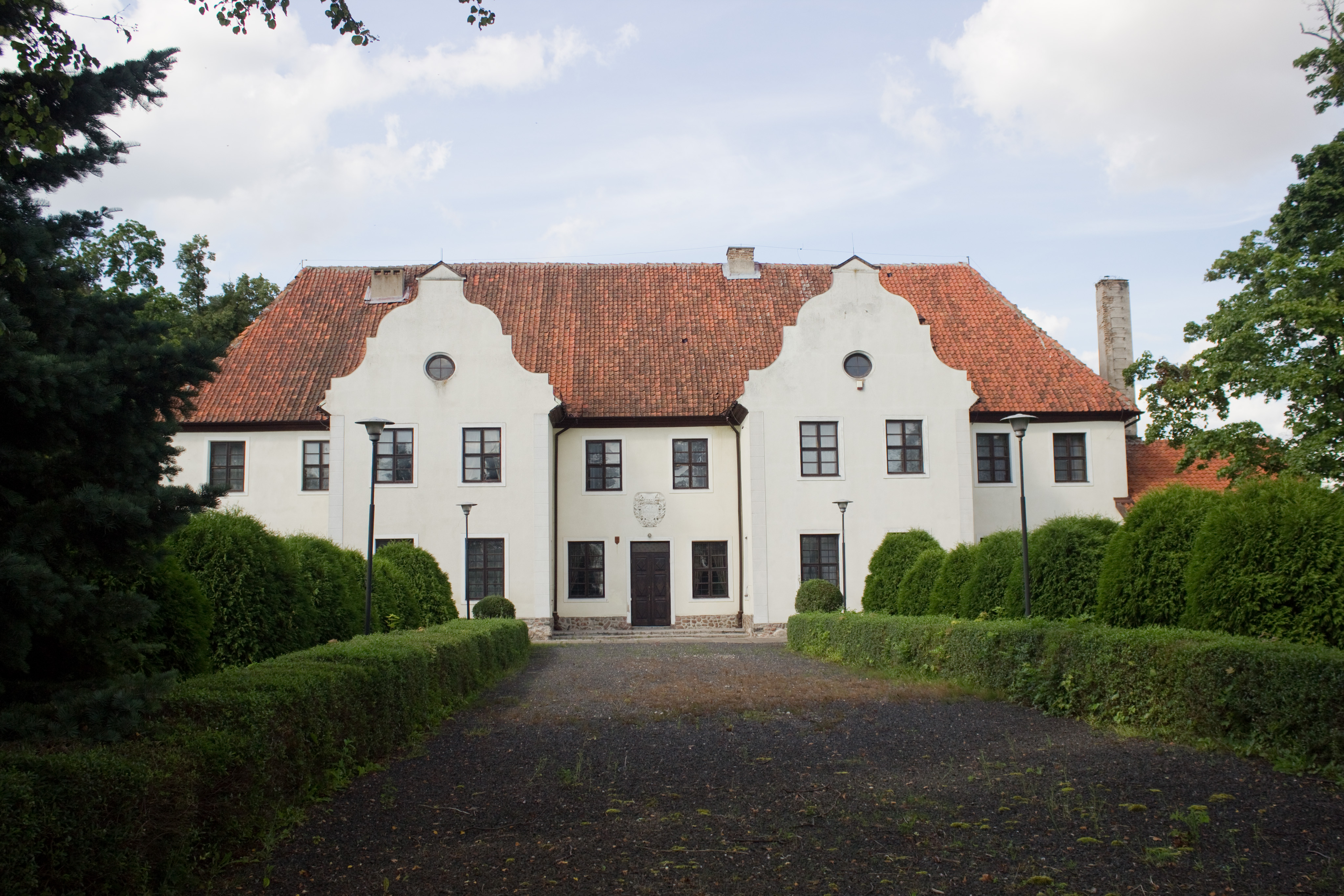
- Tolko Palace

- Location within Poland
- Coordinates: 54°14′34″N 20°42′35″E
- Country: Poland
- Voivodeship: Warmian-Masurian
- County: Bartoszyce
- Gmina: Bartoszyce
- Population: 627
- Time zone: UTC+1 (CET)
  - Summer (DST): UTC+2 (CEST)
- Vehicle registration: NBA

Tolko [ˈtɔlkɔ] (German: Tolks) is a village in the administrative district of Gmina Bartoszyce, within Bartoszyce County, Warmian-Masurian Voivodeship, in northern Poland, close to the border with the Kaliningrad Oblast of Russia.
