= Bajdyty =

- Village
- Location within Poland
- Coordinates: 54°9′17″N 20°58′25″E
- Country: Poland
- Voivodeship: Warmian-Masurian
- County: Bartoszyce
- Gmina: Bartoszyce
- Time zone: UTC+1 (CET)
  - Summer (DST): UTC+2 (CEST)
- Vehicle registration: NBA

Bajdyty [bai̯ˈdɨtɨ] (German: Beyditten) is a village in the administrative district of Gmina Bartoszyce, within Bartoszyce County, Warmian-Masurian Voivodeship, in northern Poland, close to the border with the Kaliningrad Oblast of Russia.

The Wierzbicki Polish noble family lived in the village.
