= Kisity =

- Settlement
- Location within Poland
- Coordinates: 54°19′21″N 20°44′28″E
- Country: Poland
- Voivodeship: Warmian-Masurian
- County: Bartoszyce
- Gmina: Bartoszyce

Kisity [kʲiˈɕitɨ] (German: Kissitten) is a settlement in the administrative district of Gmina Bartoszyce, within Bartoszyce County, Warmian-Masurian Voivodeship, in northern Poland, close to the border with the Kaliningrad Oblast of Russia.
