= Poniki, Warmian-Masurian Voivodeship =

Poniki
- Village
- Location within Poland
- Coordinates: 54°19′N 20°55′E
- Country: Poland
- Voivodeship: Warmian-Masurian
- County: Bartoszyce
- Gmina: Sępopol
- Population: 333

Poniki [pɔˈniki] is a village in the administrative district of Gmina Sępopol, within Bartoszyce County, Warmian-Masurian Voivodeship, in northern Poland, close to the border with the Kaliningrad Oblast of Russia.
