= Smolanka, Warmian-Masurian Voivodeship =

Smolanka
- Village
- Location within Poland
- Coordinates: 54°16′N 20°59′E
- Country: Poland
- Voivodeship: Warmian-Masurian
- County: Bartoszyce
- Gmina: Sępopol
- Population (approx.): 400

Smolanka [smɔˈlanka] is a village in the administrative district of Gmina Sępopol, within Bartoszyce County, Warmian-Masurian Voivodeship, in northern Poland, close to the border with the Kaliningrad Oblast of Russia.
