= Styligi =

- Settlement
- Location within Poland
- Coordinates: 54°20′12″N 20°45′00″E
- Country: Poland
- Voivodeship: Warmian-Masurian
- County: Bartoszyce
- Gmina: Bartoszyce

Styligi [stɨˈlʲiɡʲi] (German: Stilgen) is a settlement in the administrative district of Gmina Bartoszyce, within Bartoszyce County, Warmian-Masurian Voivodeship, in northern Poland, close to the border with the Kaliningrad Oblast of Russia.
