= Wysieka =

- Settlement
- Location within Poland
- Coordinates: 54°18′15″N 20°43′42″E
- Country: Poland
- Voivodeship: Warmian-Masurian
- County: Bartoszyce
- Gmina: Bartoszyce

Wysieka [vɨˈɕɛka] (German: Schonklitten) is a settlement in the administrative district of Gmina Bartoszyce within Bartoszyce County, Warmian-Masurian Voivodeship, in northern Poland; it is close to the border with the Kaliningrad Oblast of Russia.
