= Pasarnia =

- Settlement
- Location within Poland
- Coordinates: 54°11′04″N 20°52′02″E
- Country: Poland
- Voivodeship: Warmian-Masurian
- County: Bartoszyce
- Gmina: Bartoszyce

Pasarnia [paˈsarɲa] is a settlement in the administrative district of Gmina Bartoszyce, within Bartoszyce County, Warmian-Masurian Voivodeship, in northern Poland, close to the border with the Kaliningrad Oblast of Russia.
