= Króle, Warmian-Masurian Voivodeship =

Króle
- Village
- Location within Poland
- Coordinates: 54°9′1″N 20°55′5″E
- Country: Poland
- Voivodeship: Warmian-Masurian
- County: Bartoszyce
- Gmina: Bartoszyce
- Population: 90

Króle [ˈkrulɛ] (German: Königs) is a village in the administrative district of Gmina Bartoszyce, within Bartoszyce County, Warmian-Masurian Voivodeship, in northern Poland, close to the border with the Kaliningrad Oblast of Russia.

The village has a population of 90.
