= Frączki =

Frączki may refer to:

- Frączki, Bartoszyce County, Poland
- Frączki, Olsztyn County, Poland
