= Korytki, Warmian-Masurian Voivodeship =

Korytki
- Village
- Location within Poland
- Coordinates: 54°19′46″N 20°56′0″E
- Country: Poland
- Voivodeship: Warmian-Masurian
- County: Bartoszyce
- Gmina: Sępopol

Korytki [kɔˈrɨtki] is a village in the administrative district of Gmina Sępopol, within Bartoszyce County, Warmian-Masurian Voivodeship, in northern Poland, close to the border with the Kaliningrad Oblast of Russia.
