= Bieliny, Warmian-Masurian Voivodeship =

Bieliny
- Village
- Location within Poland
- Coordinates: 54°9′23″N 20°57′21″E
- Country: Poland
- Voivodeship: Warmian-Masurian
- County: Bartoszyce
- Gmina: Bartoszyce

Bieliny [bʲɛˈlʲinɨ] (German: Bellienen) is a village in the administrative district of Gmina Bartoszyce, within Bartoszyce County, Warmian-Masurian Voivodeship, in northern Poland, close to the border with the Kaliningrad Oblast of Russia.
