= Wojciechy, Bartoszyce County =

Wojciechy
- Village
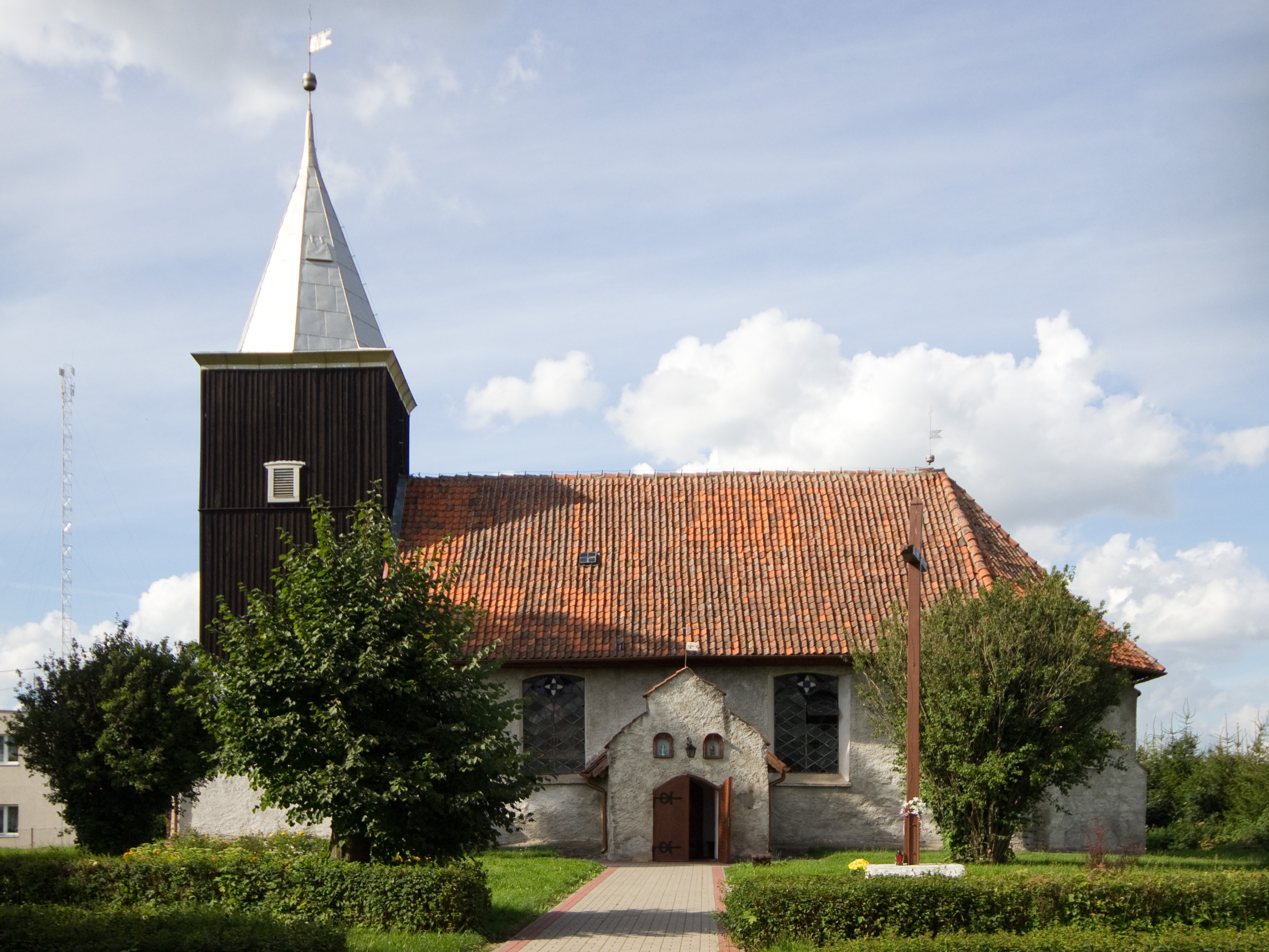
- Saint Andrew Bobola church in Wojciechy

- Location within Poland
- Coordinates: 54°15′41″N 20°40′4″E
- Country: Poland
- Voivodeship: Warmian-Masurian
- County: Bartoszyce
- Gmina: Bartoszyce

Population
  - Total: 548 (2,011)
- Time zone: UTC+1 (CET)
  - Summer (DST): UTC+2 (CEST)
- Vehicle registration: NBA

Wojciechy (Polish: [vɔjˈt͡ɕɛxɨ]; German: Albrechtsdorf) is a village in the administrative district of Gmina Bartoszyce, within Bartoszyce County, Warmian-Masurian Voivodeship, in northern Poland, close to the border with the Kaliningrad Oblast of Russia.

From 1959 to 1961 it was administratively located in the Górowo County in the Olsztyn Voivodeship.
