= Park, Warmian-Masurian Voivodeship =

Park
- Village
- Location within Poland
- Coordinates: 54°20′11″N 20°53′10″E
- Country: Poland
- Voivodeship: Warmian-Masurian
- County: Bartoszyce
- Gmina: Sępopol

Park [park] is a village in the administrative district of Gmina Sępopol, within Bartoszyce County, Warmian-Masurian Voivodeship, in northern Poland, close to the border with the Kaliningrad Oblast of Russia.
