= Kromarki =

- Village
- Location within Poland
- Coordinates: 54°20′N 20°47′E
- Country: Poland
- Voivodeship: Warmian-Masurian
- County: Bartoszyce
- Gmina: Bartoszyce
- Population (approx.): 120
- Website: http://kromarki.deviantart.com

Kromarki [krɔˈmarkʲi] (German: Kromargen) is a village in the administrative district of Gmina Bartoszyce, within Bartoszyce County, Warmian-Masurian Voivodeship, in northern Poland, close to the border with the Kaliningrad Oblast of Russia.

The village has an approximate population of 120.
