= Gruda, Bartoszyce County =

Gruda
- Village
- Location within Poland
- Coordinates: 54°12′58″N 20°56′43″E
- Country: Poland
- Voivodeship: Warmian-Masurian
- County: Bartoszyce
- Gmina: Bartoszyce
- Elevation: 58 m (190 ft)
- Population: 60

Gruda [ˈɡruda] (German: Louisenruh) is a village in the administrative district of Gmina Bartoszyce, within Bartoszyce County, Warmian-Masurian Voivodeship, in northern Poland, close to the border with the Kaliningrad Oblast of Russia.
