= Borki, Bartoszyce County =

Borki
- Village
- Location within Poland
- Coordinates: 54°16′N 20°43′E
- Country: Poland
- Voivodeship: Warmian-Masurian
- County: Bartoszyce
- Gmina: Bartoszyce

Borki [ˈbɔrkʲi] (German: Borken) is a village in the administrative district of Gmina Bartoszyce, within Bartoszyce County, Warmian-Masurian Voivodeship, in northern Poland, close to the border with the Kaliningrad Oblast of Russia.
