= Łojdy =

- Village
- Location within Poland
- Coordinates: 54°16′13″N 20°45′43″E
- Country: Poland
- Voivodeship: Warmian-Masurian
- County: Bartoszyce
- Gmina: Bartoszyce

Łojdy [ˈwɔi̯dɨ] (German: Loyden) is a village in the administrative district of Gmina Bartoszyce, within Bartoszyce County, Warmian-Masurian Voivodeship, in northern Poland, close to the border with the Kaliningrad Oblast of Russia.
