= Jarkowo, Warmian-Masurian Voivodeship =

Jarkowo
- Village
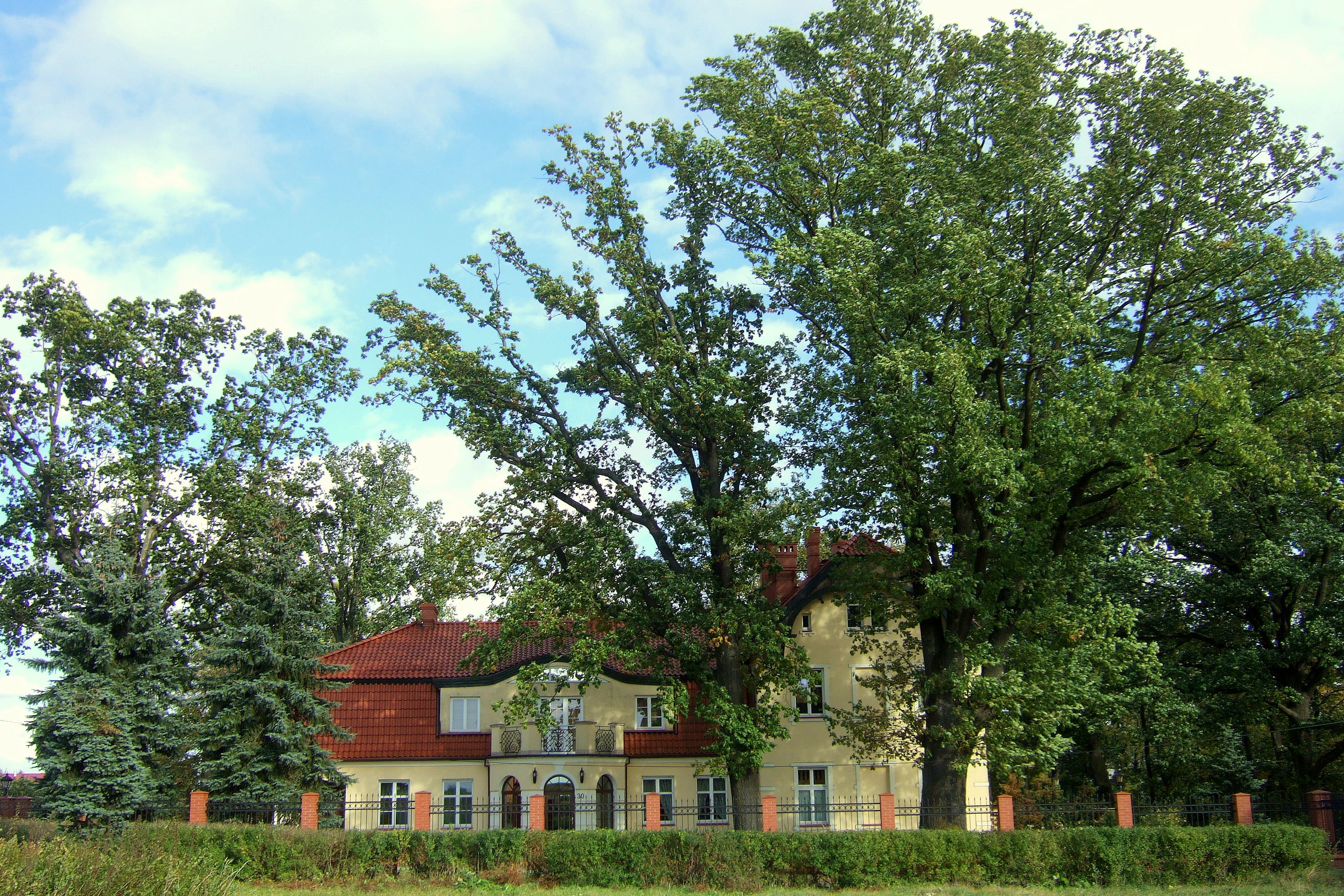

- Location within Poland
- Coordinates: 54°16′01″N 20°47′30″E
- Country: Poland
- Voivodeship: Warmian-Masurian
- County: Bartoszyce
- Gmina: Bartoszyce

Jarkowo [jarˈkɔvɔ] (German: Erwienen) is a village in the administrative district of Gmina Bartoszyce, within Bartoszyce County, Warmian-Masurian Voivodeship, in northern Poland, close to the border with the Kaliningrad Oblast of Russia.
