= Klekotki, Bartoszyce County =

Klekotki
- Settlement
- Location within Poland
- Coordinates: 54°10′9″N 20°46′38″E
- Country: Poland
- Voivodeship: Warmian-Masurian
- County: Bartoszyce
- Gmina: Bartoszyce

Klekotki [klɛˈkɔtkʲi] (German: Charlottenberg) is a settlement in the administrative district of Gmina Bartoszyce, within Bartoszyce County, Warmian-Masurian Voivodeship, in northern Poland, close to the border with the Kaliningrad Oblast of Russia.
