= Ardapy =

- Village
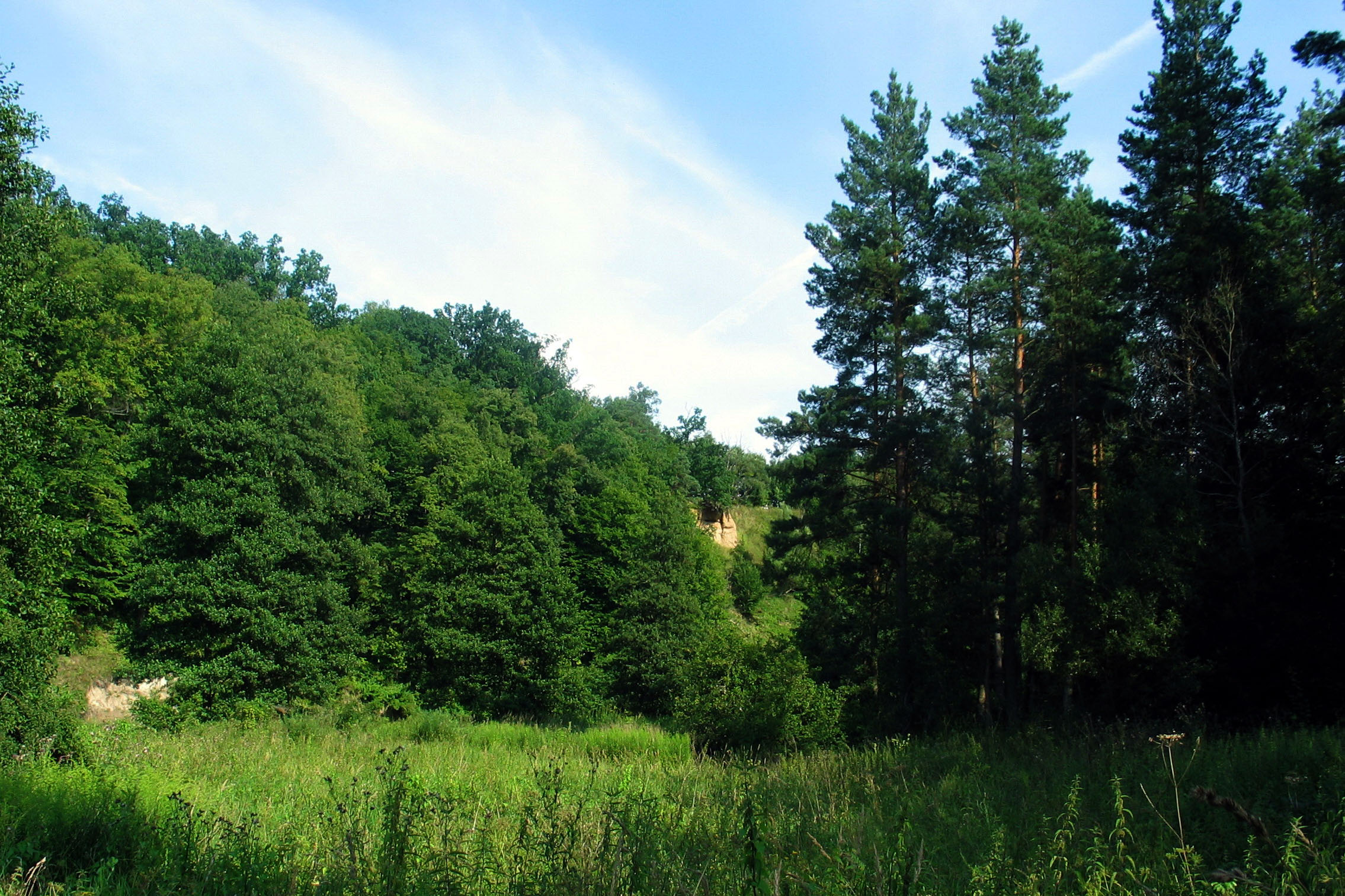

- Location within Poland
- Coordinates: 54°14′N 20°46′E
- Country: Poland
- Voivodeship: Warmian-Masurian
- County: Bartoszyce
- Gmina: Bartoszyce
- Time zone: UTC+1 (CET)
  - Summer (DST): UTC+2 (CEST)
- Vehicle registration: NBA

Ardapy [arˈdapɨ] (German: Ardappen) is a village in the administrative district of Gmina Bartoszyce, within Bartoszyce County, Warmian-Masurian Voivodeship, in northern Poland, close to the border with the Kaliningrad Oblast of Russia.

From 1945 to 1958 the village was administratively located in the Iławka County in the Masurian District and Olsztyn Voivodeship.
