= Molwity =

- Village
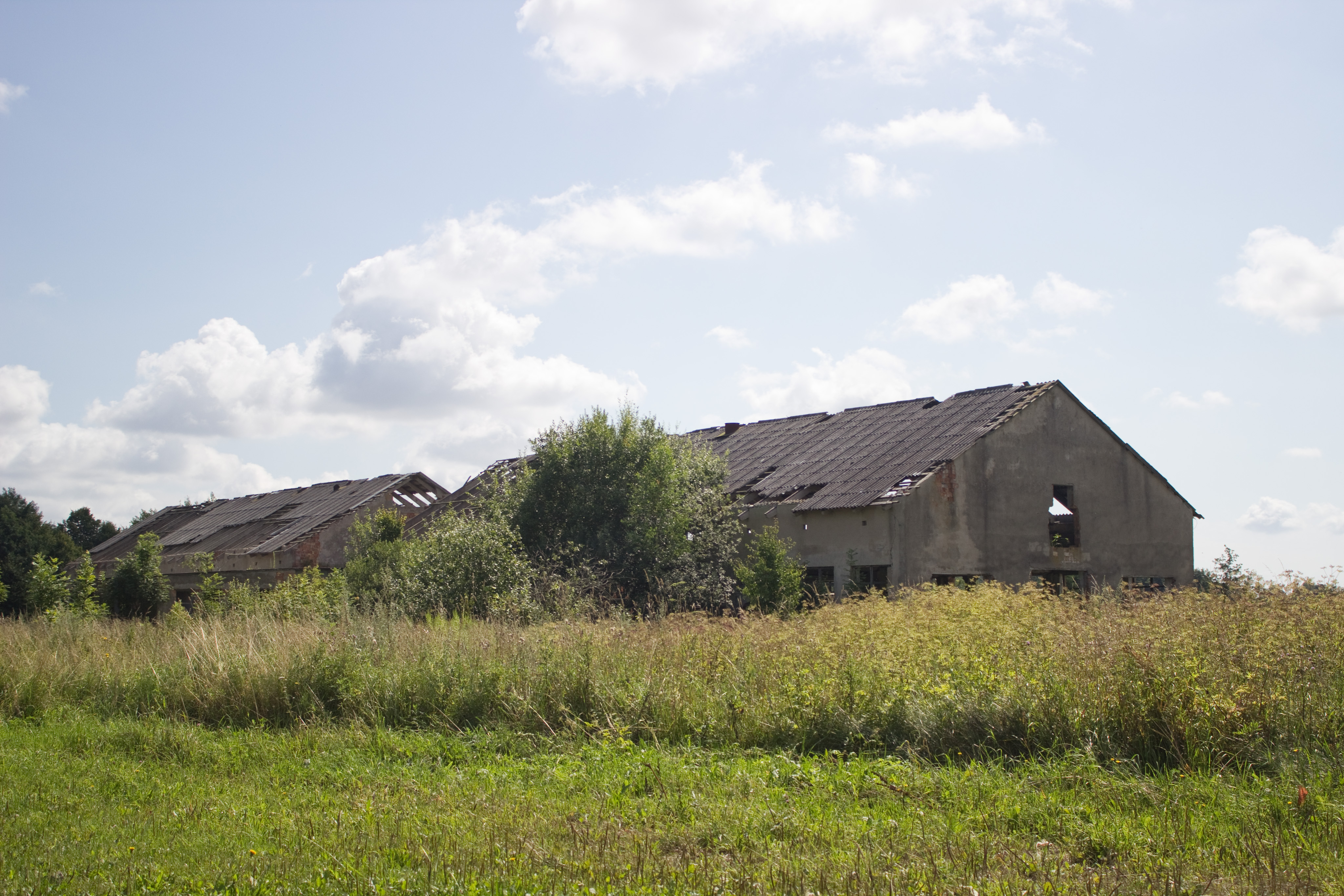

- Location within Poland
- Coordinates: 54°21′40″N 20°41′40″E
- Country: Poland
- Voivodeship: Warmian-Masurian
- County: Bartoszyce
- Gmina: Bartoszyce

Molwity [mɔlˈvʲitɨ] (German: Mollwitten) is a village in the administrative district of Gmina Bartoszyce, within Bartoszyce County, Warmian-Masurian Voivodeship, in northern Poland, close to the border with the Kaliningrad Oblast of Russia.
