= Lejdy =

- Village
- Location within Poland
- Coordinates: 54°20′N 20°45′E
- Country: Poland
- Voivodeship: Warmian-Masurian
- County: Bartoszyce
- Gmina: Bartoszyce

Lejdy [ˈlɛi̯dɨ] (German: Legden) is a village in the administrative district of Gmina Bartoszyce, within Bartoszyce County, Warmian-Masurian Voivodeship, in northern Poland, close to the border with the Kaliningrad Oblast of Russia.
