= Łabędnik Mały =

- Village
- Location within Poland
- Coordinates: 54°11′39″N 20°55′52″E
- Country: Poland
- Voivodeship: Warmian-Masurian
- County: Bartoszyce
- Gmina: Bartoszyce

Łabędnik Mały [waˈbɛndɲik ˈmawɨ] (German: Klein Schwansfeld) is a village in the administrative district of Gmina Bartoszyce, within Bartoszyce County, Warmian-Masurian Voivodeship, in northern Poland, close to the border with the Kaliningrad Oblast of Russia.
