= Żardyny =

- Village
- Location within Poland
- Coordinates: 54°21′59″N 20°44′16″E
- Country: Poland
- Voivodeship: Warmian-Masurian
- County: Bartoszyce
- Gmina: Bartoszyce
- Population: 40

Żardyny [ʐarˈdɨnɨ] (German: Sardienen) is a village in the administrative district of Gmina Bartoszyce, within Bartoszyce County, Warmian-Masurian Voivodeship, in northern Poland, close to the border with the Kaliningrad Oblast of Russia.

The village has a population of 40.
