= Kicina =

- Village
- Location within Poland
- Coordinates: 54°13′22″N 20°35′52″E
- Country: Poland
- Voivodeship: Warmian-Masurian
- County: Bartoszyce
- Gmina: Bartoszyce
- Population: 30

Kicina [kʲiˈt͡ɕina] (German: Liebhausen) is a village in the administrative district of Gmina Bartoszyce, within Bartoszyce County, Warmian-Masurian Voivodeship, in northern Poland, close to the border with the Kaliningrad Oblast of Russia.

The village has a population of 30.
