= Wiatrowiec, Warmian-Masurian Voivodeship =

Wiatrowiec
- Village
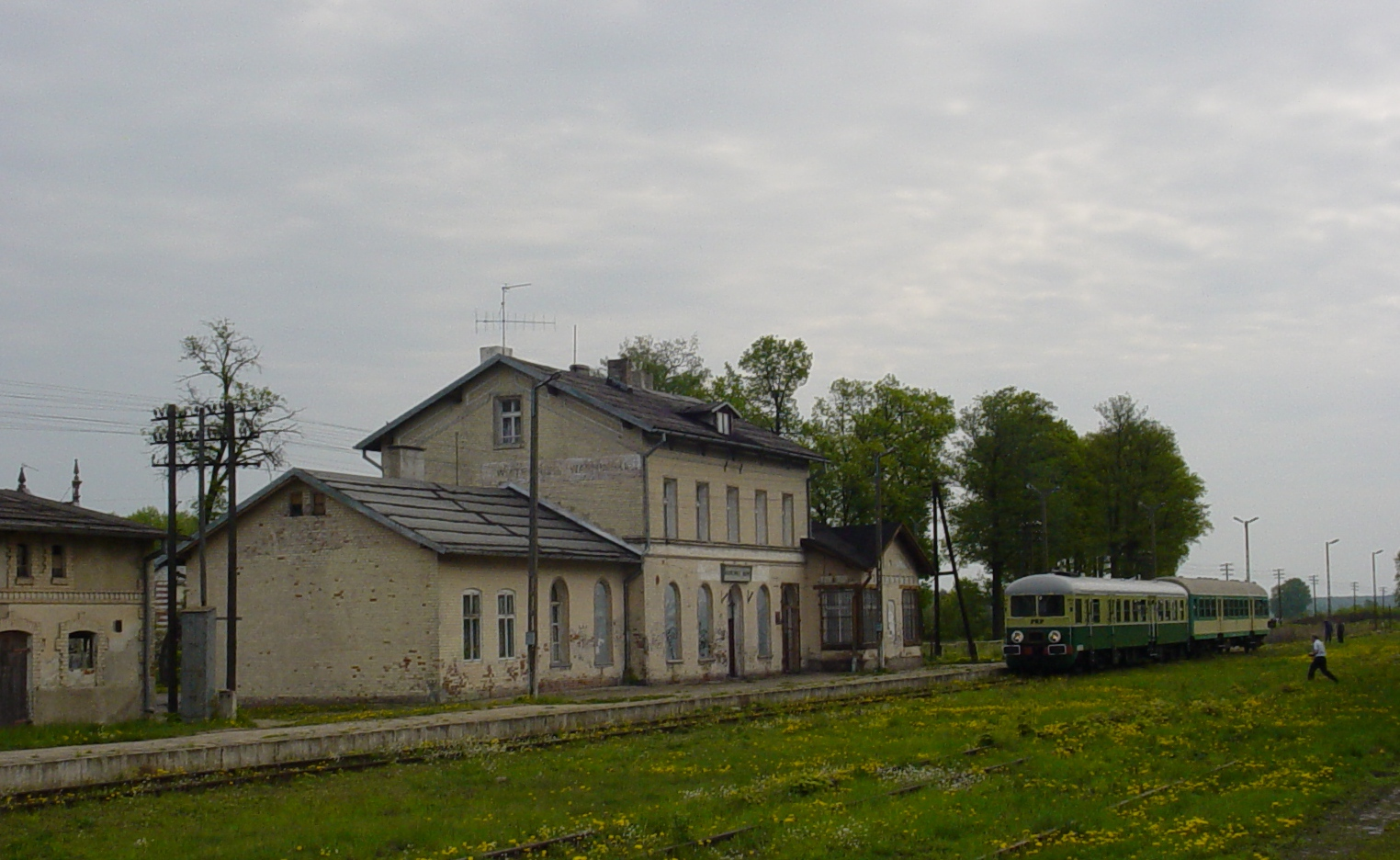
- Wiatrowiec Warmiński railway station

- Location within Poland
- Coordinates: 54°14′28″N 20°57′30″E
- Country: Poland
- Voivodeship: Warmian-Masurian
- County: Bartoszyce
- Gmina: Sępopol

Wiatrowiec [vjaˈtrɔvjɛt͡s] is a village in the administrative district of Gmina Sępopol, within Bartoszyce County, Warmian-Masurian Voivodeship, in northern Poland, close to the border with the Kaliningrad Oblast of Russia.
