= Nuni =

Nuni may refer to:

== People ==
- Geula Nuni (1942–2014), Israeli actress and singer
- Nuni Omot (born 1994), South Sudanese-American basketball player
- Siddhartha Nuni (fl. 2012–2022), Indian film director
- Zintkala Nuni (1890–1920), Lakota Sioux woman

== Other ==
- Nuni language
- Ain Nuni, a village in Iraq

== See also ==
- Nuna people, of Burkina Faso, speakers of the Nuni language
- Nunis, a surname
- Nuny, Poland
