= Dębiany =

Dębiany may refer to the following places:

- Dębiany, Kuyavian-Pomeranian Voivodeship (north-central Poland)
- Dębiany, Jędrzejów County in Świętokrzyskie Voivodeship (south-central Poland)
- Dębiany, Kazimierza County in Świętokrzyskie Voivodeship (south-central Poland)
- Dębiany, Pińczów County in Świętokrzyskie Voivodeship (south-central Poland)
- Dębiany, Sandomierz County in Świętokrzyskie Voivodeship (south-central Poland)
- Dębiany, Bartoszyce County in Warmian-Masurian Voivodeship (north Poland)
- Dębiany, Kętrzyn County in Warmian-Masurian Voivodeship (north Poland)
