= Majmławki =

- Village
- Location within Poland
- Coordinates: 54°17′44″N 21°09′03″E
- Country: Poland
- Voivodeship: Warmian-Masurian
- County: Bartoszyce
- Gmina: Sępopol

Majmławki [mai̯mˈwafki] is a village in the administrative district of Gmina Sępopol, within Bartoszyce County, Warmian-Masurian Voivodeship, in northern Poland, close to the border with the Kaliningrad Oblast of Russia.
