= Botho von Gamp =

Botho, Freiherr von Gamp-Massaunen
- Born: 4 May 1894; Berlin
- Died: 7 August 1977 (aged 83); Stockach
- Style: Impressionism
- Movement: Verschollene Generation
- Spouse: Ilse Baerwald

Botho Freiherr von Gamp-Massaunen (4 May 1894, Berlin – 7 August 1977, Stockach), known professionally as Botho von Gamp was a German painter and graphic artist.

== Life and work ==
=== Early life and background ===
Botho von Gamp was a son of a senior government official Karl von Gamp-Massaunen, landowner of Massaunen (now Masuny in Poland), and his wife Clara Bayer, daughter of the founder of Bayer-Farbenwerke, Friedrich Bayer. Botho grew up in Berlin. He had two sisters, Ilse and Hildegard, who, even before their father's death, were appointed as heirs to subsidiary estates of the Herrenhaus Hebrondamnitz as well as Worienen with Glomsienen (now Woryny in Poland). Both women married commoners.

Since 1918, as heir to his father's estate, Botho von Gamp owned the Massaunen estate in the East Prussia. Around 1932, after the Great Depression, the Massaunen manor comprised 1054 hectares, of which 425 hectares were forest. The administrator Kahsnitz served as his estate manager. Around the same time, Gamp lived on Fasanenstrasse in Berlin.

=== Art career ===
He initially moved to Munich in 1913 to study painting, and in 1922 to Paris. There he formed a close friendship with Max Pechstein and Henri Matisse, which led to his embrace of Impressionism.

From at least 1928 to 1943, his position was documented in the Jahrbuch des Vermögens und Einkommens der Millionäre in Prussia, certainly explainable by the actions and extensive wealth of his father

In 1930, he was honored with a major solo exhibition at the Fritz Gurlitt Gallery in Berlin, and in 1932, he was featured in a special exhibition at the Great Berlin Art Exhibition. During the Nazi era, he was banned from working (Arbeitsverbot) and imprisoned several times. One of them was in 1933, when Gamp, himself queer and his transfeminine lover Ossi/Ossy Gades were arrested for being "spies in disguise" (both were out wearing women's clothing). After that Gamp fled to France, and Gades was later sent to a concentration camp and arrested before committing suicide in 1937. Upon learning of this death, Gamp moved from idyllic landscapes to prison sketches depicting Gades and persecution of LGBTQ people in Nazi Germany.

In 1942 he married German Jewish actress Ilse Baerwald. In 1950 the couple returned to Germany, where they settled in Bad Schachen at Lake Constance. At the same time, the painter set up a second studio in Forio on Ischia.

=== Late life and recognition ===
Botho von Gamp also maintained a close friendship with the gallery owner Horst Apfelbaum from the 1970s onward, who regularly represented him at international art fairs through the Galerie Apfelbaum and gathered a circle that appreciated Gamp's art. In 1976, Karl-Georg von Stackelberg published a portrait of the artist entitled "The Painter Botho von Gamp." In 1984, a comprehensive catalogue with texts by the art historian Gerd Presler, illuminating the artist's complete works, was published posthumously by Galerie Apfelbaum in 120 pages.

== Literature ==
- Gothaisches Genealogisches Taschenbuch der Freiherrlichen Häuser. Zugleich Adelsmatrikel der Deutschen Adelsgenossenschaft (Deutsche Adelsgenossenschaft). Teil B (Briefadel). 1941. Jg. 91. Justus Perthes, Gotha 1940, S. 128.
- Rainer Zimmermann: Expressiver Realismus: Malerei der verschollenen Generation. Hirmer, Berlin 1994, ISBN 3-7774-6420-1, S. 374.
- Hans-Christof Kraus, Historische Kommission b. d. Bayrischen Akademie der Wissenschaften (Hrsg.): Neue Deutsche Biographie (NDB) 2010. Band 24, 4. Auflage, Duncker & Humblot, Berlin 2010, ISBN 978-3-428-11205-0, S. 781.
