= Gruszynski =

Gruszynski is a surname.

== People with the surname ==
- Alexander Gruszynski (born 1950), Polish-American cinematographer, actor and film director
- Stan Gruszynski (born 1949), American politician
- Staush Gruszynski (born 1985), American politician

== See also ==
- Gruszynki
