= Liski, Bartoszyce County =

Liski
- Village
- Location within Poland
- Coordinates: 54°17′N 20°55′E
- Country: Poland
- Voivodeship: Warmian-Masurian
- County: Bartoszyce
- Gmina: Sępopol

Liski [ˈliski] is a village in the administrative district of Gmina Sępopol, within Bartoszyce County, Warmian-Masurian Voivodeship, in northern Poland, close to the border with the Kaliningrad Oblast of Russia.
