= Pilwa, Bartoszyce County =

Pilwa
- Village
- Location within Poland
- Coordinates: 54°16′43″N 20°43′36″E
- Country: Poland
- Voivodeship: Warmian-Masurian
- County: Bartoszyce
- Gmina: Bartoszyce

Pilwa [ˈpʲilva] (German: Pillwen) is a village in the administrative district of Gmina Bartoszyce, within Bartoszyce County, Warmian-Masurian Voivodeship, in northern Poland, close to the border with the Kaliningrad Oblast of Russia.
