= Kiertyny Małe =

- Village
- Location within Poland
- Coordinates: 54°18′7″N 20°45′18″E
- Country: Poland
- Voivodeship: Warmian-Masurian
- County: Bartoszyce
- Gmina: Bartoszyce
- Population: 140

Kiertyny Małe [kʲɛrˈtɨnɨ ˈmawɛ] (German: Klein Kärthen) is a village in the administrative district of Gmina Bartoszyce, within Bartoszyce County, Warmian-Masurian Voivodeship, in northern Poland, close to the border with the Kaliningrad Oblast of Russia.
