= Drawa, Warmian-Masurian Voivodeship =

Drawa
- Village
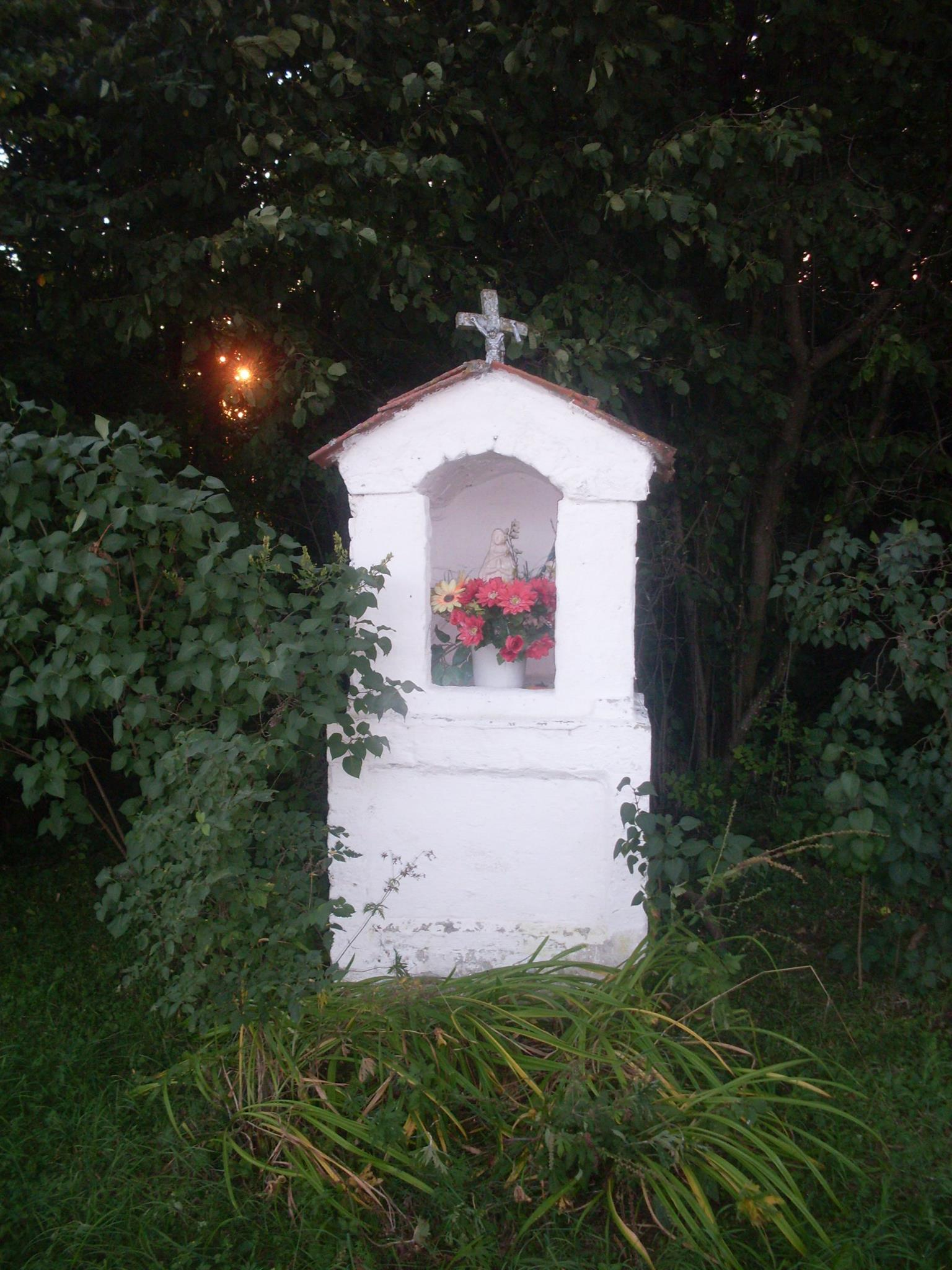
- Wayside shrine in Drawa

- Location within Poland
- Coordinates: 54°9′49″N 21°0′14″E
- Country: Poland
- Voivodeship: Warmian-Masurian
- County: Bartoszyce
- Gmina: Bartoszyce
- Time zone: UTC+1 (CET)
  - Summer (DST): UTC+2 (CEST)
- Vehicle registration: NBA

Drawa [ˈdrava] (German: Groß Sonnenburg) is a village in the administrative district of Gmina Bartoszyce, within Bartoszyce County, Warmian-Masurian Voivodeship, in northern Poland, close to the border with the Kaliningrad Oblast of Russia.

The Wierzbicki Polish noble family lived in the village.
