= Glitajny, Bartoszyce County =

Glitajny
- Village
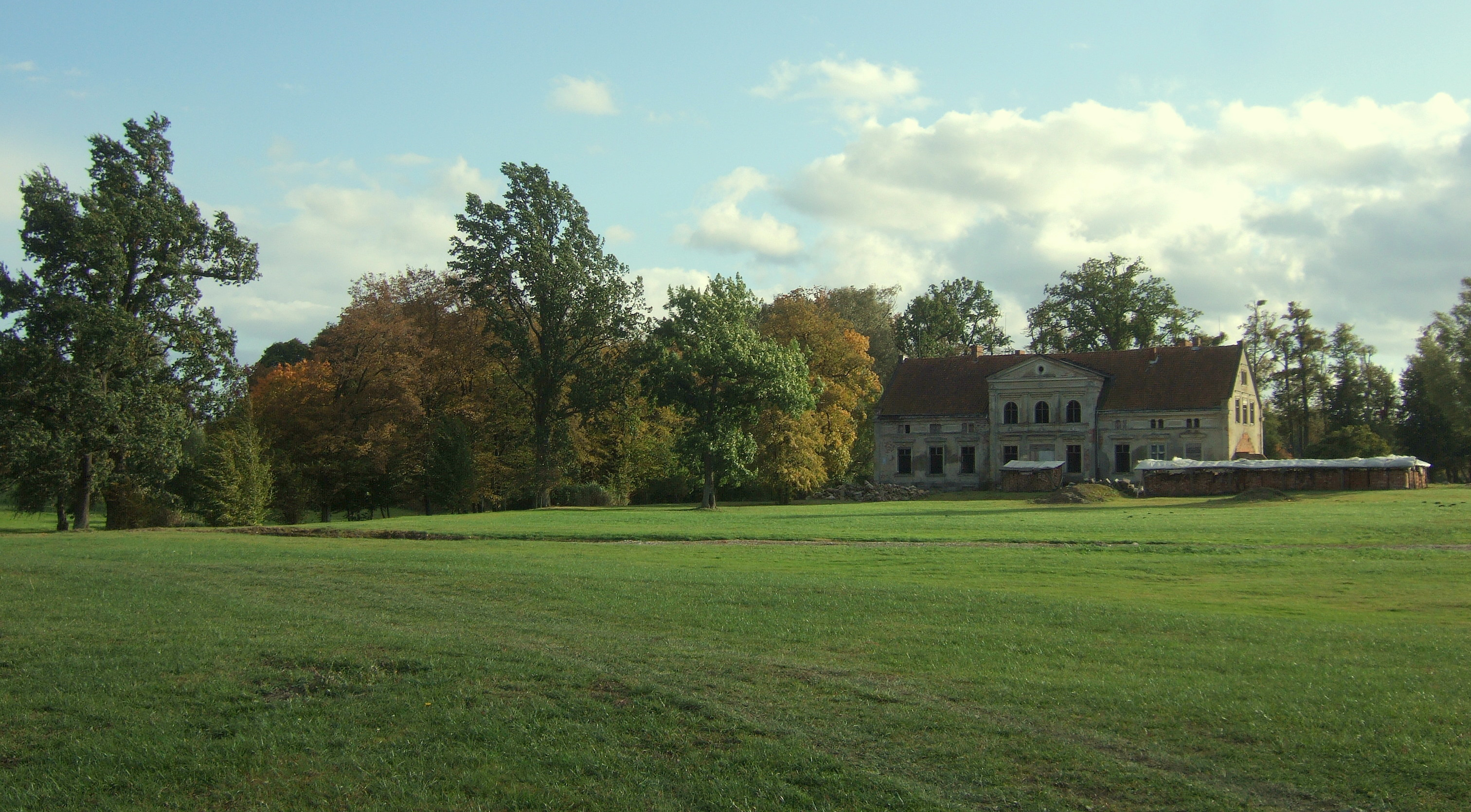

- Location within Poland
- Coordinates: 54°12′4″N 20°53′10″E
- Country: Poland
- Voivodeship: Warmian-Masurian
- County: Bartoszyce
- Gmina: Bartoszyce
- Time zone: UTC+1 (CET)
  - Summer (DST): UTC+2 (CEST)
- Vehicle registration: NBA

Glitajny [ɡlʲiˈtai̯nɨ] (German: Glittehnen) is a village in the administrative district of Gmina Bartoszyce, within Bartoszyce County, Warmian-Masurian Voivodeship, in northern Poland, close to the border with the Kaliningrad Oblast of Russia.
