= Łobzowo, Warmian-Masurian Voivodeship =

Łobzowo
- Settlement
- Location within Poland
- Coordinates: 54°14′18″N 20°58′27″E
- Country: Poland
- Voivodeship: Warmian-Masurian
- County: Bartoszyce
- Gmina: Sępopol

Łobzowo [wɔbˈzɔvɔ] is a settlement in the administrative district of Gmina Sępopol, within Bartoszyce County, Warmian-Masurian Voivodeship, in northern Poland, close to the border with the Kaliningrad Oblast of Russia.
