= Bukowo, Warmian-Masurian Voivodeship =

Bukowo
- Village
- Location within Poland
- Coordinates: 54°11′47″N 20°45′28″E
- Country: Poland
- Voivodeship: Warmian-Masurian
- County: Bartoszyce
- Gmina: Bartoszyce

Bukowo [buˈkɔvɔ] (German: Buchau) is a village in the administrative district of Gmina Bartoszyce, within Bartoszyce County, Warmian-Masurian Voivodeship, in northern Poland, close to the border with the Kaliningrad Oblast of Russia.
