= Hanns-Christian Kaiser =

German artist

Hanns Christian Kaiser (born 26 March 1969 in Karlsruhe, Germany) is a German contemporary artist. He is known for developing the artistic concept of Emergerism, which describes the self-organization of matter as a central generative principle in art.

== Early life and education ==
Kaiser was born on 26 March 1969 in Karlsruhe. He is the son of the gallerist Horst Kaiser, who operated the Apfelbaum Gallery in Karlsruhe. Through the gallery environment, Kaiser came into early contact with contemporary art and artists.

In this context, Kaiser became acquainted at an early age with the art historian and theologian Prof. Dr. Dr. Gerd Presler. This encounter developed into a long-term personal and professional relationship. Presler subsequently authored the catalogue texts for Kaiser’s work and opened his major exhibitions.

From 1978 onward, Kaiser received a formative impulse for his artistic development through his encounter with the German artist Herbert Zangs. While still a child, he assisted Zangs on several occasions in his artistic work. The direct experience of experimental, material-based methods, as well as serial and process-oriented structures, had a lasting influence on Kaiser’s understanding of art and contributed to his decision to pursue an artistic career. In parallel, Kaiser attended summer drawing courses at the State Academy of Fine Arts Karlsruhe.

== Artistic career ==
After working as a commercial graphic designer and publisher, Kaiser turned to freelance artistic practice in the early 1990s. Around the turn of the millennium, he developed the concept of Emergerism through reflection on his own work. The term derives from emergence and refers to processes in which complex, non-predictable structures arise from the interaction of simple material elements rather than from direct artistic control.

In Kaiser’s work, the artist’s intervention is largely limited to establishing initial conditions, while the final visual form results from material-inherent processes. His works frequently involve materials such as sand, pigment, and various supports, whose physical interactions generate folds, cracks, or cloud-like formations.

Since approximately 2014, Kaiser has signed selected works with his birth name, Apfelbaum, as a conceptual marker distinguishing artistic authorship from material process.

== Awards and exhibitions ==
In 2006, Kaiser received the Art Prize of the Stiftung Internationaler Kulturdialog in Ditzingen, Stuttgart. In 2010, one of his works was acquired by the Kunstsammlung der LBS in Stuttgart. In 2016, he participated in a juried group exhibition at the Staatliche Kunsthalle Karlsruhe.
