= Gromki, Bartoszyce County =

Gromki
- Village
- Location within Poland
- Coordinates: 54°10′N 20°54′E
- Country: Poland
- Voivodeship: Warmian-Masurian
- County: Bartoszyce
- Gmina: Bartoszyce

Gromki [ˈɡrɔmkʲi] is a village in the administrative district of Gmina Bartoszyce, within Bartoszyce County, Warmian-Masurian Voivodeship, in northern Poland, close to the border with the Kaliningrad Oblast of Russia.
