= Solno, Warmian-Masurian Voivodeship =

Solno
- Village
- Location within Poland
- Coordinates: 54°19′44″N 20°41′1″E
- Country: Poland
- Voivodeship: Warmian-Masurian
- County: Bartoszyce
- Gmina: Bartoszyce

Solno [ˈsɔlnɔ] (German: Zohlen) is a village in the administrative district of Gmina Bartoszyce, within Bartoszyce County, Warmian-Masurian Voivodeship, in northern Poland, close to the border with the Kaliningrad Oblast of Russia.
