= Wojtkowo =

- Village
- Location within Poland
- Coordinates: 54°13′05″N 20°36′35″E
- Country: Poland
- Voivodeship: Warmian-Masurian
- County: Bartoszyce
- Gmina: Bartoszyce
- Population (approx.): 86

Wojtkowo [vɔi̯tˈkɔvɔ] (German: Markhausen) is a village in the administrative district of Gmina Bartoszyce, within Bartoszyce County, Warmian-Masurian Voivodeship, in northern Poland, close to the border with the Kaliningrad Oblast of Russia.
