= Czerwona Górka, Warmian-Masurian Voivodeship =

Czerwona Górka
- Village
- Location within Poland
- Coordinates: 54°13′10″N 20°51′10″E
- Country: Poland
- Voivodeship: Warmian-Masurian
- County: Bartoszyce
- Gmina: Bartoszyce

Czerwona Górka [t͡ʂɛrˈvɔna ˈɡurka] (German: Rothgörken) is a village in the administrative district of Gmina Bartoszyce, within Bartoszyce County, Warmian-Masurian Voivodeship, in northern Poland, close to the border with the Kaliningrad Oblast of Russia.
