= Zawiersze =

- Village
- Location within Poland
- Coordinates: 54°18′26″N 20°51′13″E
- Country: Poland
- Voivodeship: Warmian-Masurian
- County: Bartoszyce
- Gmina: Bartoszyce

Zawiersze [zaˈvʲɛrʂɛ] (German: Sauerschienen) is a village in the administrative district of Gmina Bartoszyce, within Bartoszyce County, Warmian-Masurian Voivodeship, in northern Poland, close to the border with the Kaliningrad Oblast of Russia.
