= Plęsy, Warmian-Masurian Voivodeship =

Plęsy
- Village
- Location within Poland
- Coordinates: 54°13′N 20°48′E
- Country: Poland
- Voivodeship: Warmian-Masurian
- County: Bartoszyce
- Gmina: Bartoszyce

Plęsy [ˈplɛ̃sɨ] (German: Plensen) is a village in the administrative district of Gmina Bartoszyce, within Bartoszyce County, Warmian-Masurian Voivodeship, in northern Poland, close to the border with the Kaliningrad Oblast of Russia.
