= Borki Sędrowskie =

- Village
- Location within Poland
- Coordinates: 54°8′30″N 20°51′26″E
- Country: Poland
- Voivodeship: Warmian-Masurian
- County: Bartoszyce
- Gmina: Bartoszyce

Borki Sędrowskie [ˈbɔrkʲi sɛnˈdrɔfskʲɛ] (German: Zanderborken) is a village in the administrative district of Gmina Bartoszyce, within Bartoszyce County, Warmian-Masurian Voivodeship, in northern Poland, close to the border with the Kaliningrad Oblast of Russia.
