= Osieka =

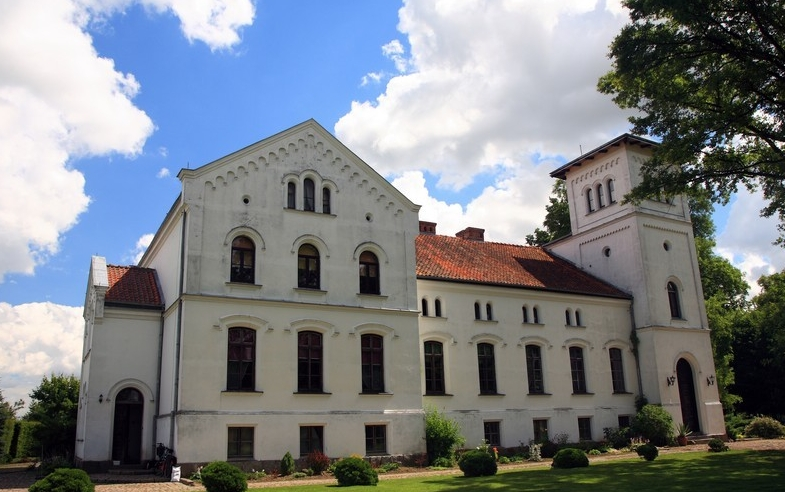
- The manor house

- Location within Poland
- Coordinates: 54°12′32″N 20°47′01″E
- Country: Poland
- Voivodeship: Warmian-Masurian
- County: Bartoszyce
- Gmina: Bartoszyce

Osieka [ɔˈɕɛka] (German: Hermenhagen) is a village in the administrative district of Gmina Bartoszyce, within Bartoszyce County, Warmian-Masurian Voivodeship, in northern Poland, close to the border with the Kaliningrad Oblast of Russia.
