= Kosy, Warmian-Masurian Voivodeship =

Kosy
- Village
- Location within Poland
- Coordinates: 54°10′N 20°52′E
- Country: Poland
- Voivodeship: Warmian-Masurian
- County: Bartoszyce
- Gmina: Bartoszyce
- Population: 110

Kosy [ˈkɔsɨ] (German: Quossen) is a village in the administrative district of Gmina Bartoszyce, within Bartoszyce County, Warmian-Masurian Voivodeship, in northern Poland, close to the border with the Kaliningrad Oblast of Russia.

The village has a population of 110.
