= Gaj, Bartoszyce County =

Gaj
- Village
- Location within Poland
- Coordinates: 54°19′19″N 21°9′25″E
- Country: Poland
- Voivodeship: Warmian-Masurian
- County: Bartoszyce
- Gmina: Sępopol
- Population: 90

Gaj [ɡai̯] is a village in the administrative district of Gmina Sępopol, within Bartoszyce County, Warmian-Masurian Voivodeship, in northern Poland, close to the border with the Kaliningrad Oblast of Russia.
