= Dzietrzychowo =

- Village
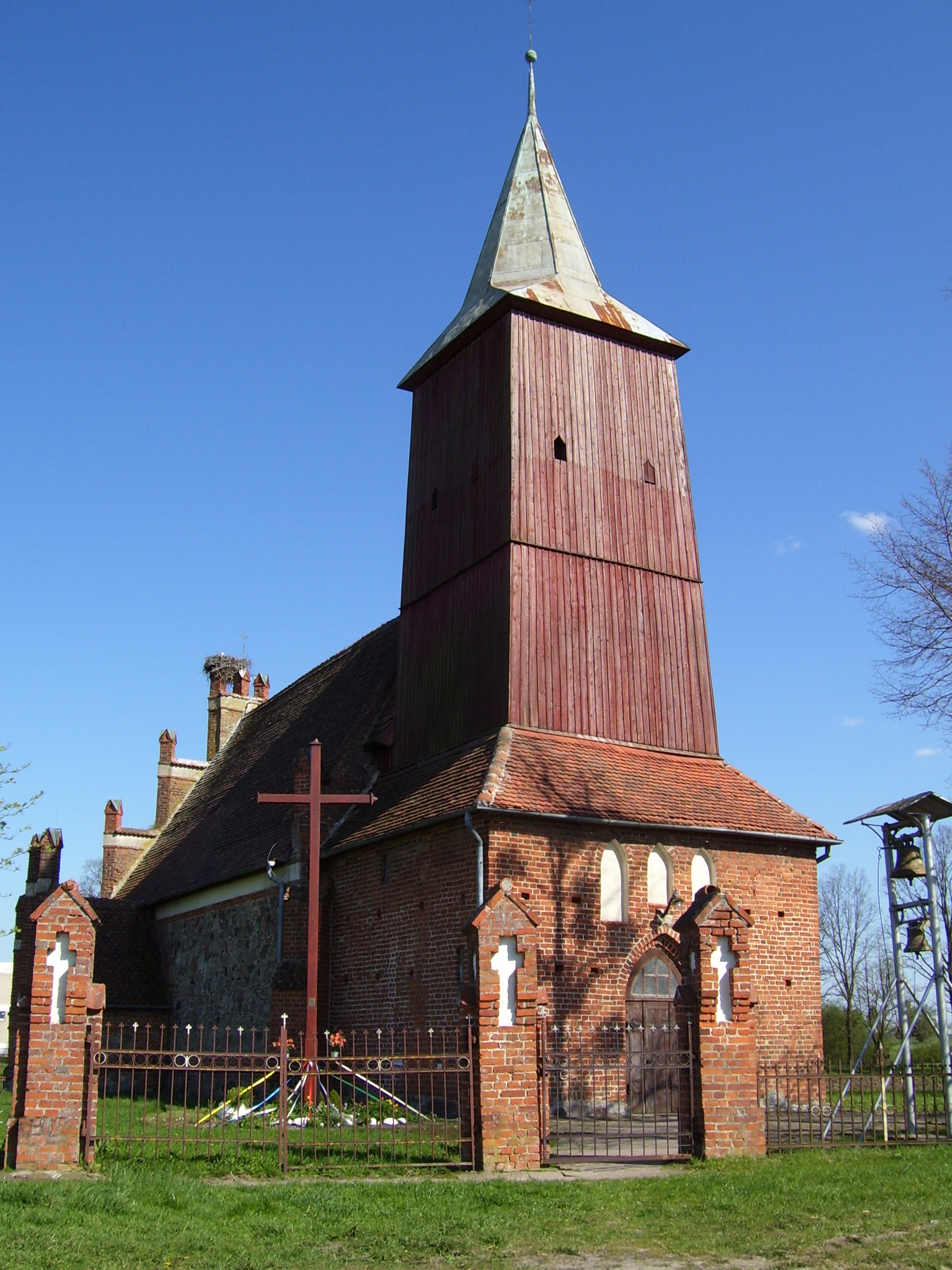
- Dzietrzychowo church

- Location within Poland
- Coordinates: 54°18′N 21°7′E
- Country: Poland
- Voivodeship: Warmian-Masurian
- County: Bartoszyce
- Gmina: Sępopol
- Population: 442

Dzietrzychowo [d͡ʑɛtʂɨˈxɔvɔ] is a village in the administrative district of Gmina Sępopol, within Bartoszyce County, Warmian-Masurian Voivodeship, in northern Poland, close to the border with the Kaliningrad Oblast of Russia.

== History ==
Dzietrzychowo was founded in 1361 after Dietrich Skomand, a descendant of the famous Yotvingian leader from the 13th-century Prussian uprisings, received the local estate. In 1396, Elżbieta, the widow of Dietrich, received five additional Hufen of land in Dzietrzychowo and, three years later, obtained from the Grand Master Winrich von Kniprode the renewal of the privilege of church patronage. At her initiative, construction began in the early 15th century on a brick Church of the Blessed Virgin Mary in the village.

At the turn of the 15th and 16th centuries, the church was expanded with a tower, but due to the limited wealth of the local community, only its lower section was built in masonry. In 1793, a new wooden section of the tower was added. Between 1913 and 1914, the building underwent major renovations, during which a southern porch was added in place of an older vestibule from 1631, and significant sections of the southern façade wall were rebuilt. Further restoration works took place in the 1980s.
