= Szylina Mała =

- Village
- Location within Poland
- Coordinates: 54°15′38″N 20°53′21″E
- Country: Poland
- Voivodeship: Warmian-Masurian
- County: Bartoszyce
- Gmina: Bartoszyce
- Population: 333

Szylina Mała [ʂɨˈlʲina ˈmawa] (German: Klein Söllen) is a village in the administrative district of Gmina Bartoszyce, within Bartoszyce County, Warmian-Masurian Voivodeship, in northern Poland, close to the border with the Kaliningrad Oblast of Russia.
