= Lisówka =

- Settlement
- Location within Poland
- Coordinates: 54°14′N 20°54′E
- Country: Poland
- Voivodeship: Warmian-Masurian
- County: Bartoszyce
- Gmina: Bartoszyce

Lisówka [lʲiˈsufka] (German: Fuchshöfen) is a settlement in the administrative district of Gmina Bartoszyce, within Bartoszyce County, Warmian-Masurian Voivodeship, in northern Poland, close to the border with the Kaliningrad Oblast of Russia.
