= Dąbrowa, Gmina Bartoszyce =

Dąbrowa
- Village
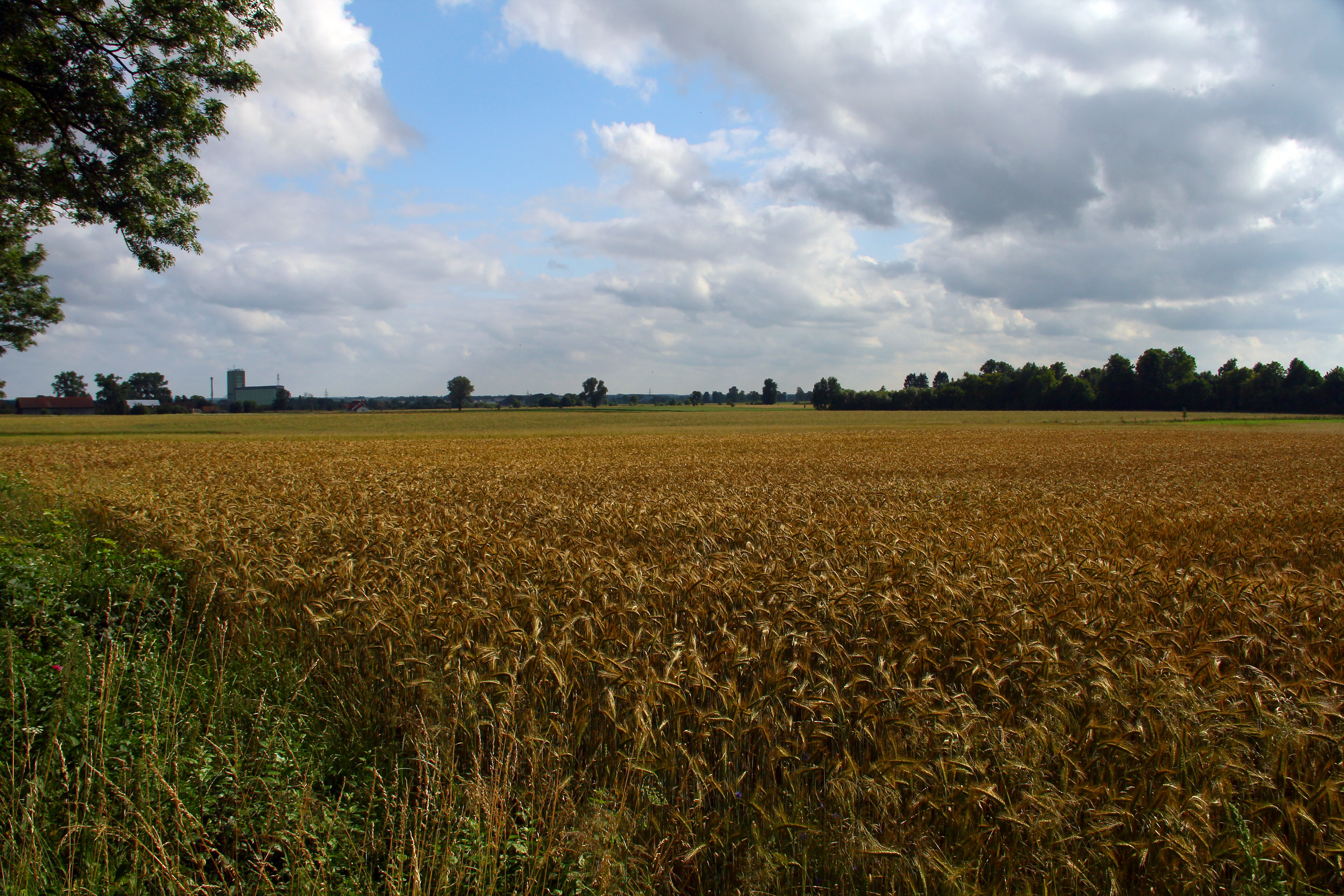
- Field in Dąbrowa

- Location within Poland
- Coordinates: 54°16′28″N 20°48′25″E
- Country: Poland
- Voivodeship: Warmian-Masurian
- County: Bartoszyce
- Gmina: Bartoszyce
- Time zone: UTC+1 (CET)
  - Summer (DST): UTC+2 (CEST)
- Vehicle registration: NBA

Dąbrowa [dɔmˈbrɔva] (German: Damerau) is a village in the administrative district of Gmina Bartoszyce, within Bartoszyce County, Warmian-Masurian Voivodeship, in northern Poland, close to the border with the Kaliningrad Oblast of Russia.

== Transport ==
The Polish National road 51 runs nearby, west of the village.
