= Smodajny =

- Village
- Location within Poland
- Coordinates: 54°18′50″N 21°8′22″E
- Country: Poland
- Voivodeship: Warmian-Masurian
- County: Bartoszyce
- Gmina: Sępopol

Smodajny [smɔˈdai̯nɨ] is a village in the administrative district of Gmina Sępopol, within Bartoszyce County, Warmian-Masurian Voivodeship, in northern Poland, close to the border with the Kaliningrad Oblast of Russia.
