= Szwaruny =

- Village
- Location within Poland
- Coordinates: 54°12′3″N 20°49′33″E
- Country: Poland
- Voivodeship: Warmian-Masurian
- County: Bartoszyce
- Gmina: Bartoszyce

Szwaruny [ʂfaˈrunɨ] (German: Groß Schwaraunen) is a village in the administrative district of Gmina Bartoszyce, within Bartoszyce County, Warmian-Masurian Voivodeship, in northern Poland, close to the border with the Kaliningrad Oblast of Russia.
