= Sycz =

Sycz is a surname. Notable people with the surname include:

- Miron Sycz (1960–2024), Polish teacher and politician
- Robert Sycz (born 1973), Polish rower
