= Wargielity =

- Village
- Location within Poland
- Coordinates: 54°15′27″N 20°37′5″E
- Country: Poland
- Voivodeship: Warmian-Masurian
- County: Bartoszyce
- Gmina: Bartoszyce

Wargielity [varɡʲɛˈlʲitɨ] (German: Worglitten) is a village in the administrative district of Gmina Bartoszyce, within Bartoszyce County, Warmian-Masurian Voivodeship, in northern Poland, close to the border with the Kaliningrad Oblast of Russia.
