= Bąsze =

- Village
- Location within Poland
- Coordinates: 54°20′6″N 20°48′58″E
- Country: Poland
- Voivodeship: Warmian-Masurian
- County: Bartoszyce
- Gmina: Bartoszyce
- Population: 44 (2,011)

Bąsze [ˈbɔ̃ʂɛ] (German: Bonschen) is a village in the administrative district of Gmina Bartoszyce, within Bartoszyce County, Warmian-Masurian Voivodeship, in northern Poland, close to the border with the Kaliningrad Oblast of Russia.
