= Pasławki =

- Village
- Location within Poland
- Coordinates: 54°11′30″N 21°1′13″E
- Country: Poland
- Voivodeship: Warmian-Masurian
- County: Bartoszyce
- Gmina: Sępopol
- Population: 50

Pasławki [paˈswafki] is a village in the administrative district of Gmina Sępopol, within Bartoszyce County, Warmian-Masurian Voivodeship. It is in northern Poland, close to the border with the Kaliningrad Oblast of Russia.
