= Gmina Bartoszyce =

Gmina Bartoszyce Bartoszyce Commune
- Gmina
- Coat of arms
- Interactive map of Gmina Bartoszyce
- Coordinates (Bartoszyce): 54°15′N 20°48′E
- Country: Poland
- Voivodeship: Warmian-Masurian
- County: Bartoszyce
- Seat: Bartoszyce

Area
  - Total: 427.82 km^{2} (165.18 sq mi)

Population (2006)
  - Total: 10,769
  - Density: 25.172/km^{2} (65.195/sq mi)
- Website: https://gmina-bartoszyce.pl/

Gmina Bartoszyce is a rural gmina (administrative district) in Bartoszyce County, Warmian-Masurian Voivodeship, in northern Poland, on the border with Russia. Its seat is the town of Bartoszyce, although the town is not part of the territory of the gmina.

The gmina covers an area of 427.82 square kilometres (165.2 sq mi), and as of 2006 its total population is 10,769.

== Villages ==
Gmina Bartoszyce contains the villages and settlements of:

- Ardapy
- Bajdyty
- Barciszewo
- Bąsze
- Bezledy
- Biała Podlaska
- Bieliny
- Borki
- Borki Sędrowskie
- Brzostkowo
- Bukowo
- Burkarty
- Ceglarki
- Ciemna Wola
- Czerwona Górka
- Dąbrowa
- Dębiany
- Drawa
- Falczewo
- Frączki
- Galinki
- Galiny
- Ganitajny
- Gile
- Glitajny
- Głomno
- Gromki
- Gruda
- Gruszynki
- Jarkowo
- Karolewka
- Karolewko
- Kicina
- Kiersity
- Kiertyny Małe
- Kiertyny Wielkie
- Kinkajmy
- Kisity
- Klekotki
- Kosy
- Krawczyki
- Króle
- Kromarki
- Łabędnik
- Łabędnik Mały
- Łapkiejmy
- Leginy
- Lejdy
- Lipina
- Lisówka
- Łojdy
- Łoskajmy
- Lusiny
- Markiny
- Maszewy
- Matyjaszki
- Merguny
- Minty
- Molwity
- Nalikajmy
- Nowe Witki
- Nuny
- Okopa
- Osieka
- Parkoszewo
- Pasarnia
- Perkujki
- Perkuliki
- Piergozy
- Piersele
- Pilwa
- Plęsy
- Połęcze
- Posłusze
- Rodnowo
- Sędławki
- Skitno
- Sokolica
- Solno
- Sortławki
- Sporwiny
- Spurgle
- Spytajny
- Styligi
- Szczeciny
- Szwarunki
- Szwaruny
- Szylina Mała
- Szylina Wielka
- Tapilkajmy
- Tolko
- Tromity
- Trutnowo
- Wajsnory
- Wardomy
- Wargielity
- Wawrzyny
- Węgoryty
- Wiatrak
- Wipławki
- Wirwilty
- Witki
- Wojciechy
- Wojtkowo
- Wola
- Wólka
- Wyręba
- Wysieka
- Żardyny
- Zawiersze
- Żydowo

== Neighbouring gminas ==
Gmina Bartoszyce is bordered by the town of Bartoszyce and by the gminas of Bisztynek, Górowo Iławeckie, Kiwity, Lidzbark Warmiński and Sępopol. It also borders Russia (Kaliningrad oblast).
