= Miron Sycz =

Polish teacher and politician (1960–2024)

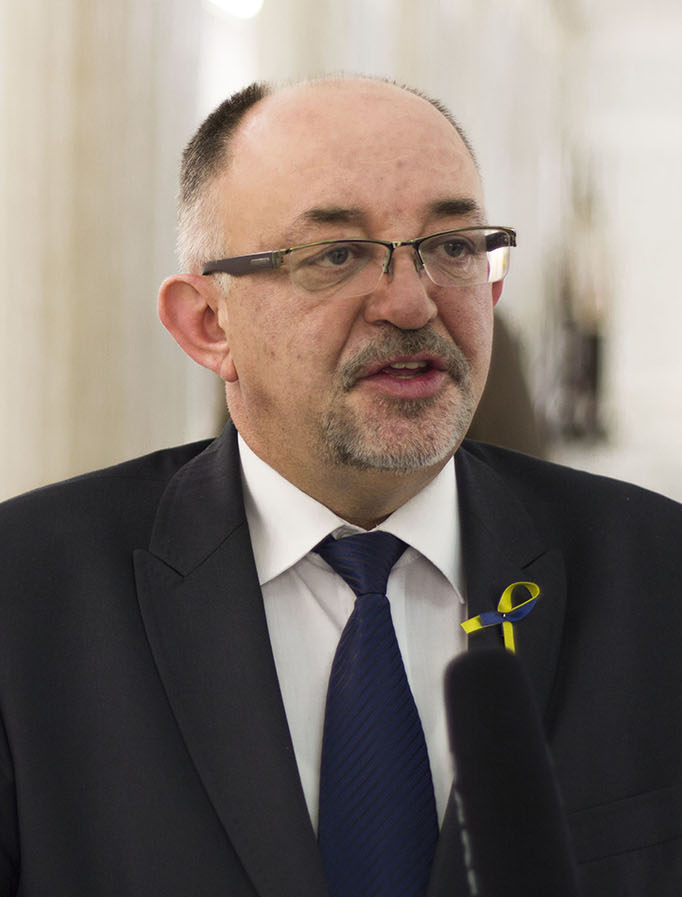
- Sycz in 2014

Member of the Sejm
- In office 5 November 2007 – 11 November 2015

Personal details
- Born: 3 January 1960 Ostre Bardo, Poland
- Died: 4 April 2024 (aged 64)
- Party: PZPR; PO
- Education: Higher School of Pedagogy in Olsztyn
- Occupation: Teacher

Miron Sycz (Ukrainian: Мирон Сич; 3 January 1960 – 4 April 2024) was a Polish teacher and politician of Ukrainian origin. A member of the Civic Platform, he served in the Sejm from 2007 to 2015.

Sycz died on 4 April 2024, at the age of 64.
