= Eberhard von Kuenheim =

German industrial manager

- Born: 2 October 1928 (age 97); Juditten, East Prussia, Germany
- Occupations: CEO, BMW (1970 - 1993)
- Known for: being the Chairman of the Executive Board of BMW, 1970–1993
- Predecessor: Gerhard Wilcke
- Successor: Bernd Pischetsrieder
- Children: Hendrik von Kuenheim, general director of BMW Motorrad

Eberhard von Kuenheim (born 2 October 1928) is a German industrial manager. He was Chairman of the executive board (effectively CEO) of the BMW Group, between 1970 and 1993.

== Biography ==
Kuenheim was born in Juditten (Polish: Judyty) near Bartenstein, (East Prussia). His father died of a riding accident in 1935, his mother died in a Soviet NKVD camp after World War II.

Kuenheim fled the advancing Red Army in early 1945 and was evacuated via Pillau to Western Germany in March 1945 throughout the Operation Hannibal.

He studied mechanical engineering until 1954 at the Technical University of Stuttgart and joined the Quandt Group, BMW's largest shareholder since 1959, in 1965.

On 1 January 1970, Kuenheim became the CEO of the BMW Group. When Kuenheim became CEO, BMW had 23,000 employees; when he left the post in 1993, the number had risen to 71,000. Kuenheim "transformed BMW from a small, unfocused manufacturer of cars and motorcycles into a world performance luxury icon".

After Bernd Pischetsrieder followed him as CEO, Kuenheim guided BMW's supervisory board until 1999. Today Kuenheim is the head of BMW's Eberhard-von-Kuenheim-Foundation. He is also an Honorary Senator of the Technical University of Munich, which named a building at the mechanical engineering faculty after him.
