= Nunis =

Nunis is a surname. Notable people with the surname include:

- Kevin Nunis (1959–2025), Malaysian field hockey player
- Sam Nunis (1903–1980), American auto racing executive

== See also ==
- Nuni (disambiguation)
