= Ostre Bardo, Warmian-Masurian Voivodeship =

Ostre Bardo
- Village
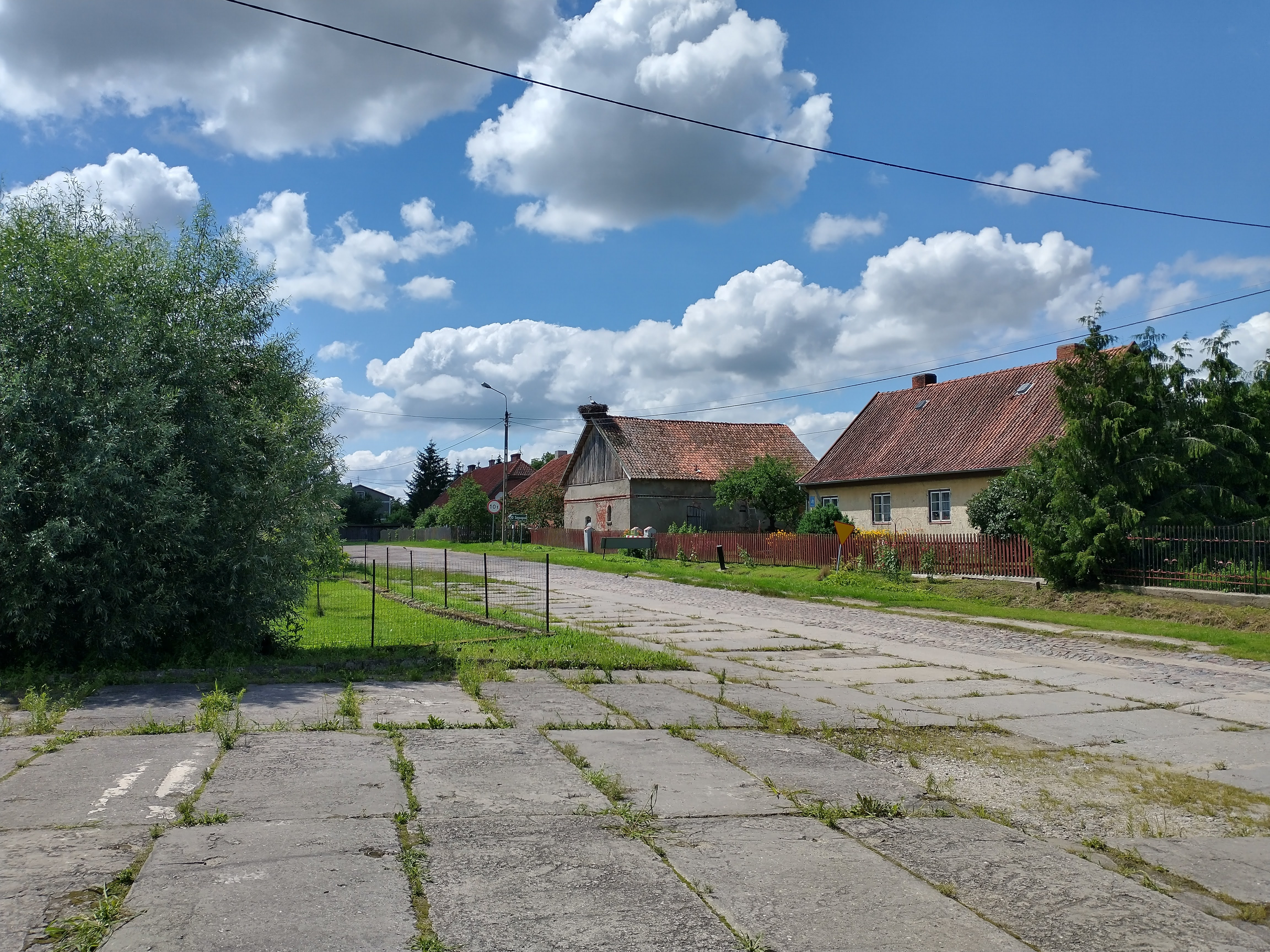

- Location within Poland
- Coordinates: 54°21′N 20°59′E
- Country: Poland
- Voivodeship: Warmian-Masurian
- County: Bartoszyce
- Gmina: Sępopol

Ostre Bardo [ˈɔstrɛ ˈbardɔ] is a village in the administrative district of Gmina Sępopol, within Bartoszyce County, Warmian-Masurian Voivodeship, in northern Poland, close to the border with the Kaliningrad Oblast of Russia.
