= Frączki, Bartoszyce County =

Frączki
- Settlement
- Location within Poland
- Coordinates: 54°09′14″N 20°58′16″E
- Country: Poland
- Voivodeship: Warmian-Masurian
- County: Bartoszyce
- Gmina: Bartoszyce

Frączki [ˈfrɔnt͡ʂkʲi] (German: Franken, Kreis Bartenstein) is a settlement in the administrative district of Gmina Bartoszyce, within Bartoszyce County, Warmian-Masurian Voivodeship, in northern Poland, close to the border with the Kaliningrad Oblast of Russia.
