= Gmina Sępopol =

Gmina Sępopol Sępopol Commune
- Gmina
- Coat of arms
- Interactive map of Gmina Sępopol
- Coordinates (Sępopol): 54°16′5″N 21°0′1″E
- Country: Poland
- Voivodeship: Warmian-Masurian
- County: Bartoszyce
- Seat: Sępopol

Area
  - Total: 246.58 km^{2} (95.21 sq mi)

Population (2006)
  - Total: 6,589
  - Density: 26.72/km^{2} (69.21/sq mi)
  - Urban: 2,015
  - Rural: 4,574
- Website: http://free.of.pl/s/sepopol

Gmina Sępopol is an urban-rural gmina (administrative district) in Bartoszyce County, Warmian-Masurian Voivodeship, in northern Poland, on the border with Russia. Its seat is the town of Sępopol, which lies approximately 14 kilometres (9 mi) east of Bartoszyce and 63 km (39 mi) north-east of the regional capital Olsztyn.

The gmina covers an area of 246.58 square kilometres (95.2 sq mi), and as of 2006 its total population is 6,589 (out of which the population of Sępopol amounts to 2,015, and the population of the rural part of the gmina is 4,574).

== Villages ==
Apart from the town of Sępopol, Gmina Sępopol contains the villages and settlements of Boryty, Chełmiec, Długa, Dobroty, Domarady, Dzietrzychowo, Gaj, Gierkiny, Gulkajmy, Judyty, Kinwągi, Korytki, Langanki, Lipica, Liski, Łobzowo, Lwowiec, Majmławki, Masuny, Melejdy, Miedna, Ostre Bardo, Park, Pasławki, Pieny, Poniki, Prętławki, Przewarszyty, Retowy, Rogielkajmy, Romaliny, Romankowo, Roskajmy, Różyna, Rusajny, Rygarby, Śmiardowo, Smodajny, Smolanka, Stopki, Szczurkowo, Trosiny, Turcz, Wanikajmy, Wiatrowiec and Wodukajmy.

== Neighbouring gminas ==
Gmina Sępopol is bordered by the gminas of Barciany, Bartoszyce and Korsze. It also borders Russia (Kaliningrad oblast).
