= Ilse Baerwald =

German actress

Ilse Helene Baerwald (14 September 1903 – after 1939), was a German stage actress of Jewish descent who was active in the area of political theater in the 1920s and early 1930s.

== Life and work ==
Ilse Baerwald was born in 1903 to Richard Baerwald and Olga Baerwald (née Lundt) in Berlin-Charlottenburg. She was a graduate of the acting school of the Deutsches Theater (German: Schauspielschule des Deutschen Theaters zu Berlin).

Between 1924 and 1928 she belonged to the Volksbühne Berlin ensemble, where she appeared in numerous productions of Erwin Piscator's political theater, including the world premieres of Paul Zech's Das trunkene Schiff (1926) with projections by George Grosz and Alfons Paquet's Sturmflut (1926). During this time, she also appeared on stage with Marlene Dietrich and Helene Weigel, among others.

Baerwald was also active in film and sound. She appeared in Zwischen Nacht und Morgen (1931) as well as Das erste Recht des Kindes (1932), a feature film that dealt critically with the subject of abortion and was banned in 1933 at the instigation of Heinrich Himmler.

Baerwald was persecuted because of her Jewish ancestry. In 1939, she lived in Berlin-Tiergarten.

In 1942 she married German painter Botho von Gamp. In 1950 the couple returned to Germany, where they settled in Bad Schachen at Lake Constance. At the same time, they also acquired part of a Forio castle on Ischia and divided their attention between the two places.

== Theater (selection) ==
- 1918: Frank Wedekind – Die Büchse der Pandora. Dir: Carl Heine, Chamber Plays of the Deutschen Theaters
- 1924: Wilhelm Schmidtbonn – Die Fahrt nach Orplid. Dir: Paul Bildt, Volksbühne Theater am Bülowplatz
- 1924: Hans Müller-Schlösser – Schneider Wibbel. Dir: Paul Henckels, Volksbühne Theater am Bülowplatz
- 1924: Gerhart Hauptmann – Schluck und Jau. Dir: Paul Henckels, Volksbühne Theater am Bülowplatz
- 1924 (UA): Kalidasa – Sakuntala (translated into German by Rolf Lauckner). Dir: Paul Henckels, Volksbühne Theater am Bülowplatz
- 1925 (UA): Anatoli W. Lunatscharskij – Der befreite Don Quichote. Dir: Fritz Holl, Volksbühne Theater am Bülowplatz
- 1926 (UA): Alfons Paquet – Sturmflut. Dir: Erwin Piscator, Volksbühne Theater am Bülowplatz
- 1926: Johann Wolfgang von Goethe – Faust I. Dir: Fritz Holl, Volksbühne Theater am Bülowplatz
- 1926 (UA): Paul Zech – Das trunkene Schiff. Dir: Erwin Piscator, Film and Projection: George Grosz, Volksbühne Theater am Bülowplatz
- 1926: Maxim Gorki – Nachtasyl. Dir: Erwin Piscator, Volksbühne Theater am Bülowplatz
- 1928: Rudolf Lauckner – Die Entkleidung des Antonio Carossa. Dir: Günther Stark, Volksbühne Theater am Bülowplatz
- 1928: Hermann Essig – Der Kuhhandel. Dir: Viktor Schwanneke, Theater am Schiffbauerdamm
- 1928: Johann Nepomuk Nestroy – Das Mädl aus der Vorstadt. Dir: Jürgen Fehling, Stage Design: Edward Suhr, Volksbühne Theater am Bülowplatz
- 1930: Karl Megerle von Mühlfeld – Der Fall Slowenski. Dir: Fritz Staudte, Theater am Schiffbauerdamm
- 1931: August Strindberg – Der Vater. Dir: Paul Wegener
- 1933: Henrik Ibsen – John Gabriel Borkmann. Dir: Sergius Sax, Komödie Berlin

== Voice roles ==
- 1930 (DF): Vorhang auf! (OT: Gold Diggers of Broadway, USA 1929)

== Films ==
- 1931: Zwischen Nacht und Morgen, Dir: Gerhard Lamprecht
- 1932: Das erste Recht des Kindes: Aus dem Tagebuch einer Frauenärztin, Dir: Fritz Wendhausen
