= Nuny =

- Village
- Location within Poland
- Coordinates: 54°14′N 20°56′E
- Country: Poland
- Voivodeship: Warmian-Masurian
- County: Bartoszyce
- Gmina: Bartoszyce

Nuny [ˈnunɨ] (German: Nohnen) is a village in the administrative district of Gmina Bartoszyce, within Bartoszyce County, Warmian-Masurian Voivodeship, in northern Poland, close to the border with the Kaliningrad Oblast of Russia.

Nuny host annual cultural festivals celebrating traditional Polish customs.
