= Lipica, Poland =

Lipica
- Village
- Location within Poland
- Coordinates: 54°20′0″N 21°6′17″E
- Country: Poland
- Voivodeship: Warmian-Masurian
- County: Bartoszyce
- Gmina: Sępopol

Lipica [liˈpit͡sa] is a village in the administrative district of Gmina Sępopol, within Bartoszyce County, Warmian-Masurian Voivodeship, in northern Poland, close to the border with the Kaliningrad Oblast of Russia.
