= Dębiany, Bartoszyce County =

Dębiany
- Village
- Location within Poland
- Coordinates: 54°11′N 20°54′E
- Country: Poland
- Voivodeship: Warmian-Masurian
- County: Bartoszyce
- Gmina: Bartoszyce
- Population: 12

Dębiany [dɛmˈbʲanɨ] (German: Dombehnen) is a village in the administrative district of Gmina Bartoszyce, within Bartoszyce County, Warmian-Masurian Voivodeship, in northern Poland, close to the border with the Kaliningrad Oblast of Russia.
