= Bill Wiatrak =

American actor

William Adam Wiatrak (born March 4, 1961) is an American actor, travel writer, author and producer of travel videos around the world. He writes and stars in these productions under the name The Traveling Wizard. In addition to his videos, he also writes travel articles for Houstonia magazine, Matador Network, Buzz magazines and for his blog: The Traveling Wizard. Bill has also appeared in several films (Hidden in the Woods, Pizza Joint Movie, Project Aetheron) and has made appearances on Destination America and Extreme Home Makeover. Bill Wiatrak is from Houston, Texas, has visited 217 countries, and claims that he intends to visit every country in the world. Bill Wiatrak is also the author of two books, “Stories from the Road” and a children’s book, “The Story of Kwanzaa Baba”.

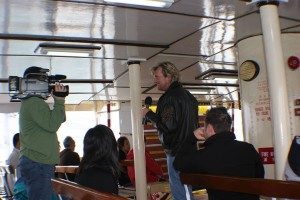
The Traveling Wizard filming in Hong Kong
