= Lipica, Škofja Loka =

Lipica
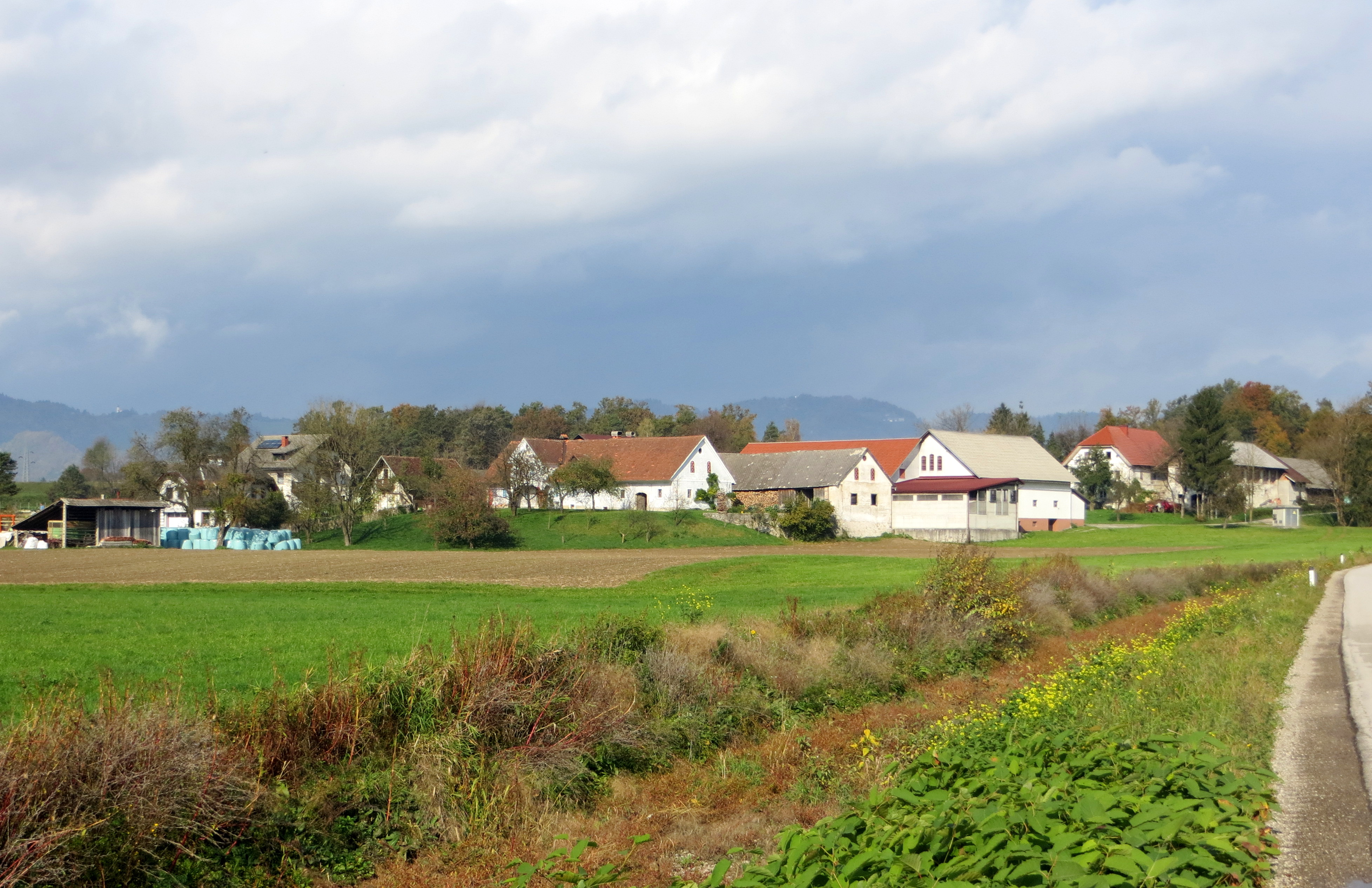

- Location in Slovenia
- Coordinates: 46°9′53.06″N 14°20′25.31″E
- Country: Slovenia
- Traditional region: Upper Carniola
- Statistical region: Upper Carniola
- Municipality: Škofja Loka

Area
  - Total: 0.77 km^{2} (0.30 sq mi)
- Elevation: 336.6 m (1,104 ft)

Population (2002)
  - Total: 37

Lipica (pronounced [ˈliːpitsa]) is a small settlement on the left bank of the Sora River in the Municipality of Škofja Loka in the Upper Carniola region of Slovenia.
