= Gerd Presler =

German theologian and art historian

Gerd Presler (b. 27 November 1937 in Hannover, Germany) is a German theologian, art historian and author. He is a professor of Evangelical theology at the Pädagogische Hochschule Karlsruhe and studies modern art, particularly Expressionism and artists' sketchbooks.

== Early life ==
Presler was born in Hannover, the eldest of four children of engineer Emil Presler and his wife Anna, née Ahlhorn. He began school in 1943 and later attended a classical secondary school in Oldenburg and Dortmund, where he completed his Abitur on 26 February 1958.

Beginning in 1958, Presler studied German studies, philosophy, Protestant theology, pedagogy, and art history at the University of Münster, the Free University of Berlin and the University of Copenhagen. During his studies, he worked at the Institute for New Testament Textual Research in Münster under Kurt Aland.

He passed his first state examination in 1966 and subsequently completed a doctoral degree in Protestant theology at Münster with a dissertation on Søren Kierkegaard, which he finished in 1970.

== Career ==
From 1968, Presler worked as an assistant at the Pädagogische Hochschule Dortmund in the field of Protestant theology. Since 1972, he has held a professorship at the Pädagogische Hochschule Karlsruhe.

In his theological research, Presler published academic articles and contributions, including studies on Martin Luther King Jr. and Kierkegaard.

== Research and publications ==
Presler's main field of research is visual arts. He published extensively on modern art movements such as the Expressionist groups Die Brücke, Art Brut, and Neue Sachlichkeit.

A central aspect of his scholarly work is the compilation of catalogues raisonnés and the study of artists’ sketchbooks. Presler authored and contributed to major catalogues, including those on the printmaking of Franz Radziwill and Asger Jorn.

He made catalogues of the sketchbooks of Ernst Ludwig Kirchner, Edvard Munch and Asger Jorn. In addition, he collaborated on publications related to Max Beckmann and Willy Baumeister. These works helped to establish sketchbooks as an important but previously under-researched field of artistic production.

== Personal life ==
In 1976, Presler married Doris Presler, née Marrek. The couple has two sons.
