= Bartoszyce County =

Bartoszyce County Powiat bartoszycki
- County
- Flag Coat of arms

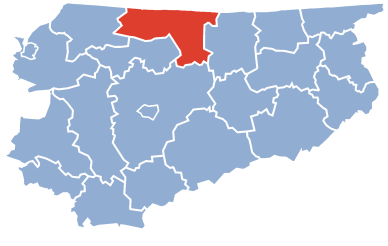
- Location within the voivodeship

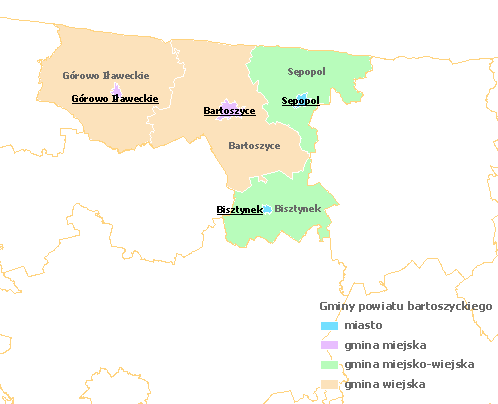
- Division into gminas
- Coordinates (Bartoszyce): 54°15′N 20°48′E
- Country: Poland
- Voivodeship: Warmian-Masurian
- Seat: Bartoszyce
- Gminas: Total 6 (incl. 2 urban): Bartoszyce; Górowo Iławeckie; Gmina Bartoszyce; Gmina Bisztynek; Gmina Górowo Iławeckie; Gmina Sępopol

Area
  - Total: 1,308.54 km^{2} (505.23 sq mi)

Population (2019)
  - Total: 57,642
  - Density: 44.051/km^{2} (114.09/sq mi)
  - Urban: 31,761
  - Rural: 25,881
- Car plates: NBA
- Website: www.powiatbartoszyce.republika.pl

Bartoszyce County (Polish: powiat bartoszycki) is a unit of territorial administration and local government (powiat) in Warmian-Masurian Voivodeship, northern Poland, on the border with Russia. It was formed on January 1, 1999, as a result of the Polish local government reforms passed in 1998. Its administrative seat and largest town is Bartoszyce, which lies 56 kilometres (35 mi) north of the regional capital Olsztyn. The county contains three other towns: Górowo Iławeckie, 21 km (13 mi) west of Bartoszyce, Bisztynek, 22 km (14 mi) south of Bartoszyce, and Sępopol, 14 km (9 mi) east of Bartoszyce.

The county covers an area of 1,308.54 square kilometres (505.2 sq mi). As of 2019 its total population is 57,642, out of which the population of Bartoszyce is 23,482, that of Górowo Iławeckie is 3,951, that of Bisztynek is 2,370, that of Sępopol is 1,958, and the rural population is 25,881.

== Neighbouring counties ==
Bartoszyce County is bordered by Kętrzyn County to the east, Olsztyn County to the south, Lidzbark County to the south-west and Braniewo County to the west. It also borders Russia (Kaliningrad Oblast) to the north.

== Administrative divisions ==
The county is subdivided into six gminas (two urban, two urban-rural and two rural). These are listed in the following table, in descending order of population.

Gmina	Type	Area (km^{2})	Population (2019)	Seat
Bartoszyce	urban	11.0	23,482	
Gmina Bartoszyce	rural	427.8	10,767	Bartoszyce *
Gmina Górowo Iławeckie	rural	416.3	6,878	Górowo Iławeckie *
Gmina Bisztynek	urban-rural	203.6	6,339	Bisztynek
Gmina Sępopol	urban-rural	246.6	6,225	Sępopol
Górowo Iławeckie	urban	3.3	3,951	
* seat not part of the gmina
