= Paul de Cock =

Flemish architect and painter

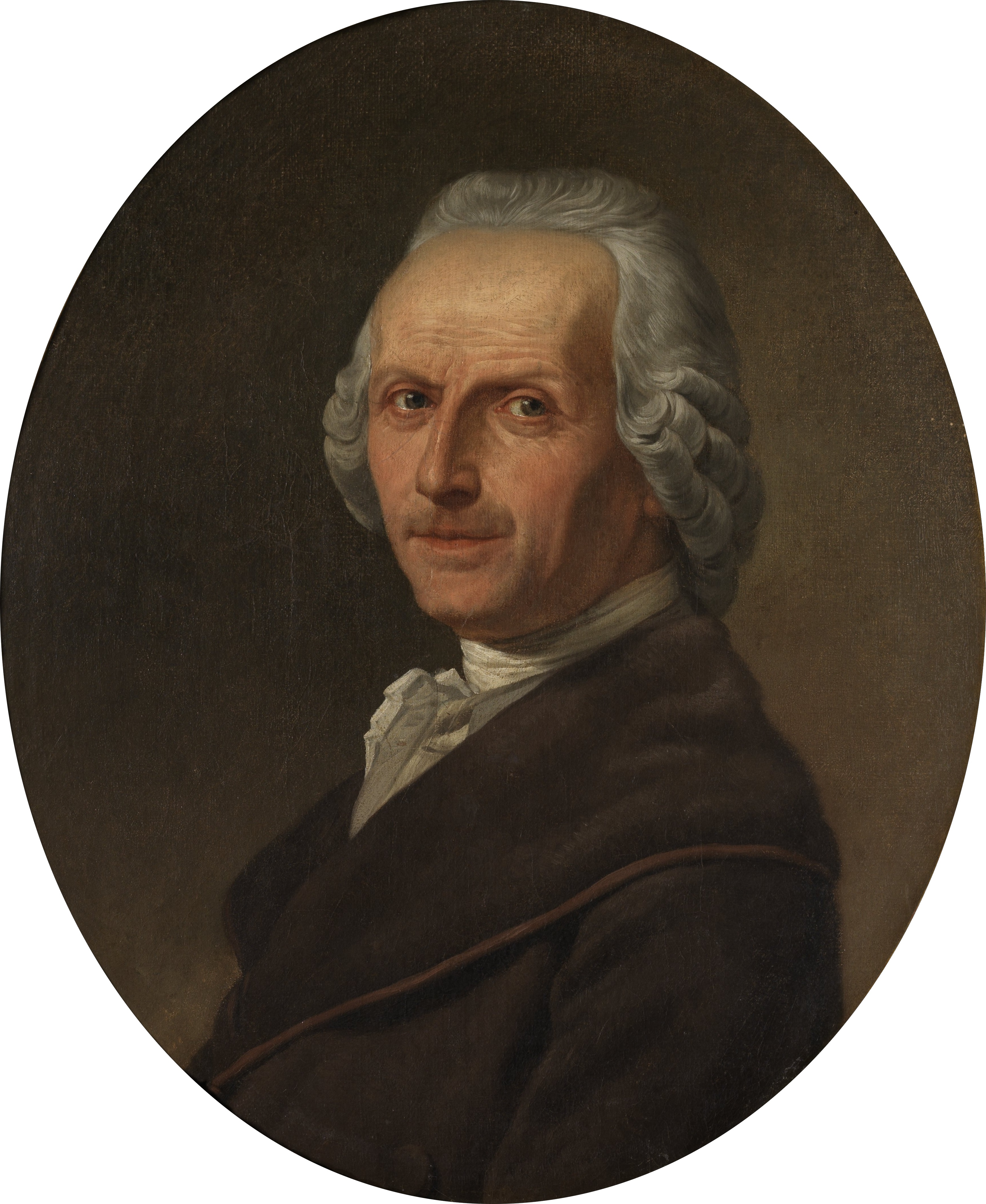
Paul de Cock by Joseph-Benoît Suvée, Groeningemuseum

Paul Jozef de Cock (21 June 1724, Bruges - 29 December 1801, Bruges) was a Flemish architect and painter.

== Life ==
He was the son of Philippe de Cock and Thérèse Cambier. His younger brother, Hubert de Cock, also became a well-known painter. He began his art studies at the precocious age of nine, at the Academie voor Schone Kunsten Brugge, under the tutelage of Matthijs de Visch.

In 1740, he was awarded a second prize for drawing and, in 1741, first prize for all subjects combined. He received a prize for architectural drawing in 1743.

From 1748 to 1749, he lived in Paris and Valenciennes, where he was a copyist for a merchant. After returning to Bruges, he was commissioned to paint a large landscape in the Town Hall at Kortrijk, modeled after the work of the Dutch master, Philips Wouwerman. Later, he created some large murals and bas-reliefs, many featuring horses and battlefields. He would eventually produce more than 1200 works, but he always earned his living primarily as an architect and builder.

Around 1750 he became an architectural instructor at the Brugse Academie and, from 1775 until his death, he served as its director; succeeding Jan Garemijn, with whom he occasionally lived.

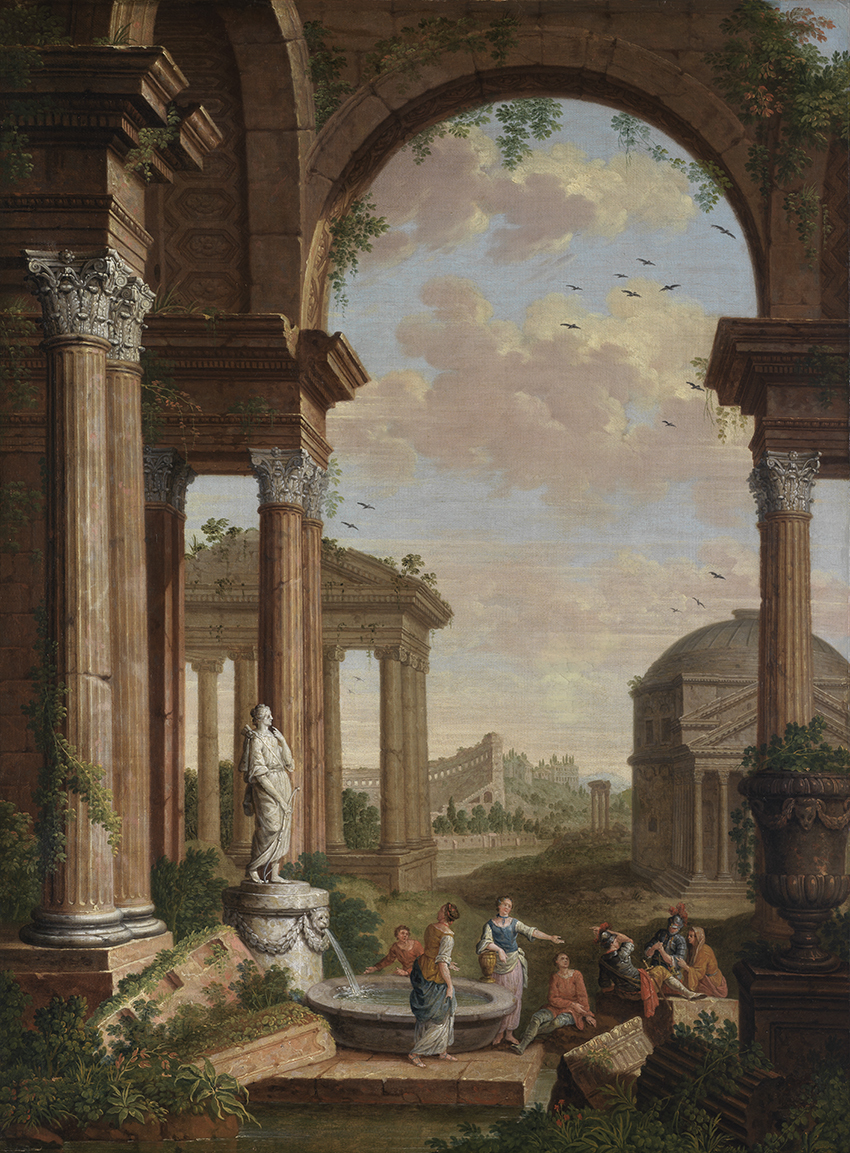
Landscape with Roman Ruins

Most of his works are in the collection of the Groeningemuseum. The museum also has two portraits of him; one by Joseph-Benoît Suvée, from 1779, and one by Jozef Angelus Van der Donckt from 1789.

== Sources ==
- Albert Schouteet, Beknopte geschiedenis van de Vrije Academie voor Schone Kunsten en van de Stedelijke Academie voor Schone Kunsten te Brugge, Brugge, 1967.
- Lexicon van West-Vlaamse kunstenaars, Brugge, 1993.
- Robert De Laere, "Paul Jozef De Cock, kunstschilder en Bouwmeester", in: Heemkundige Bijdragen voor Brugge en Ommeland, 2010, n° 5.
