= Franciscus Joseph Octave van der Donckt =

Flemish painter

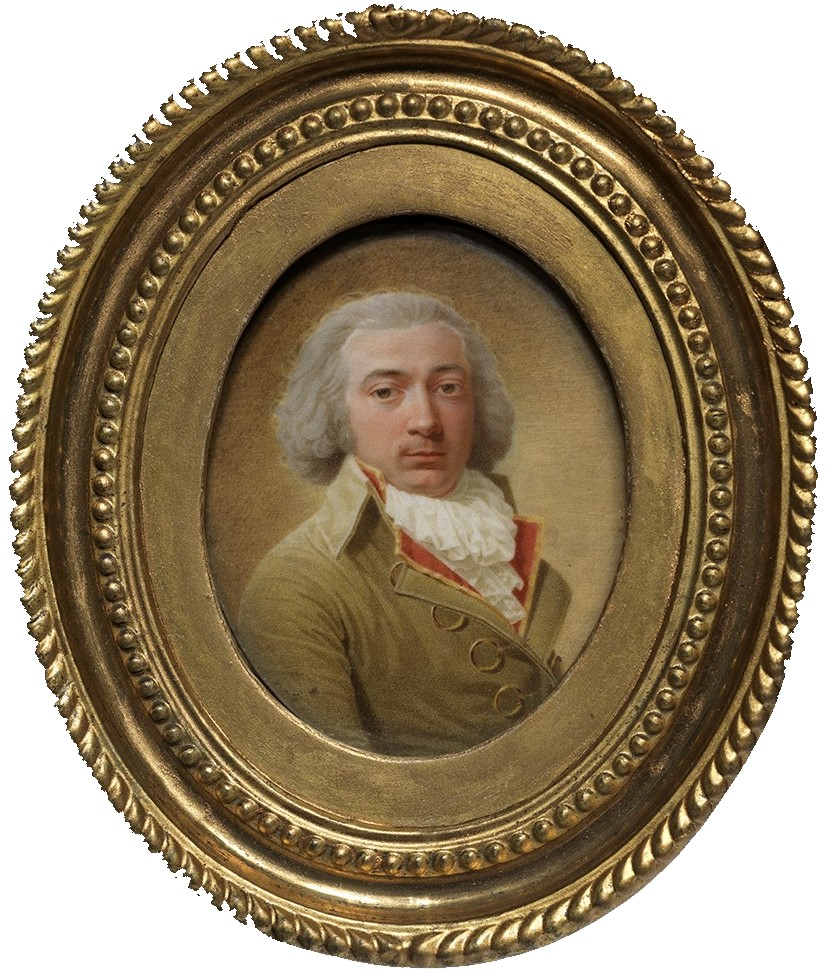
Self-portrait (1789), collection Groeningemuseum

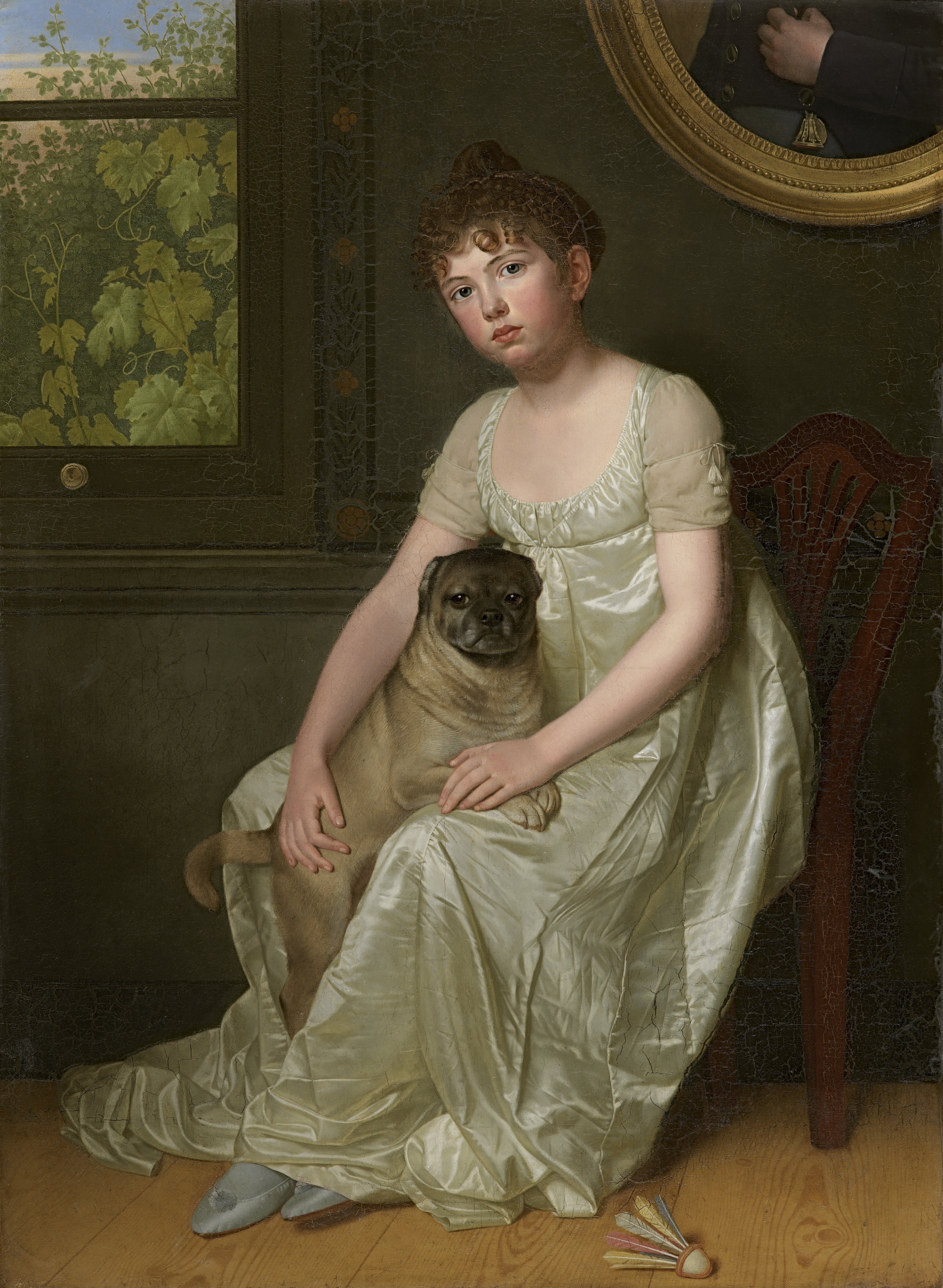
Portrait of Sylvie de la Rue

Franciscus Joseph Octave van der Donckt (30 June 1757, Aalst - 16 August 1813, Bruges) was a Flemish portrait painter, miniaturist and pastellist. He is also referred to as Jozef Angelus Van der Donckt, as well as several other variations, too numerous to list.

== Biography ==
After the early death of his father, his mother took him to her hometown of Bruges.

He had his first drawing lessons with an artist named Jacob De Rijcke, followed by painting lessons from Antoon Suweyns (1720–1789), Joseph-Benoît Suvée and Jan Anton Garemyn. At the same time, he studied the humanities at the Jesuit College. After graduating, his mother sent him to Marseille to learn the merchant trade.

He continued to be interested in art, however, and eventually moved to Paris, where he made the acquaintance of Louis Philippe I, Duke of Orléans and was allowed to copy paintings in his collection. He then travelled through Italy and returned to Bruges in 1791, becoming Director of the Academie voor Schone Kunsten. In 1796, he had a successful showing at the Salon in Ghent.

He is known primarily as a portrait painter, with a fondness for pastels. His most familiar works are a self-portrait and one of his niece, Sylvie de la Rue, who married the painter Joseph Denis Odevaere.

He also took the occasional student; notably Albert Gregorius. He is often confused with his son, François, a history painter about whom little is known.
