= De Visch =

De Visch and variations thereof is a surname. Notable people with the surname include:

- Karel de Visch (1596–1666), Cistercian bibliographer
- Matthias de Visch (1701–1765), Flemish painter
- Soraya de Visch Eijbergen (born 1993), Dutch badminton player
