= Jean-Bernard Duvivier =

French painter

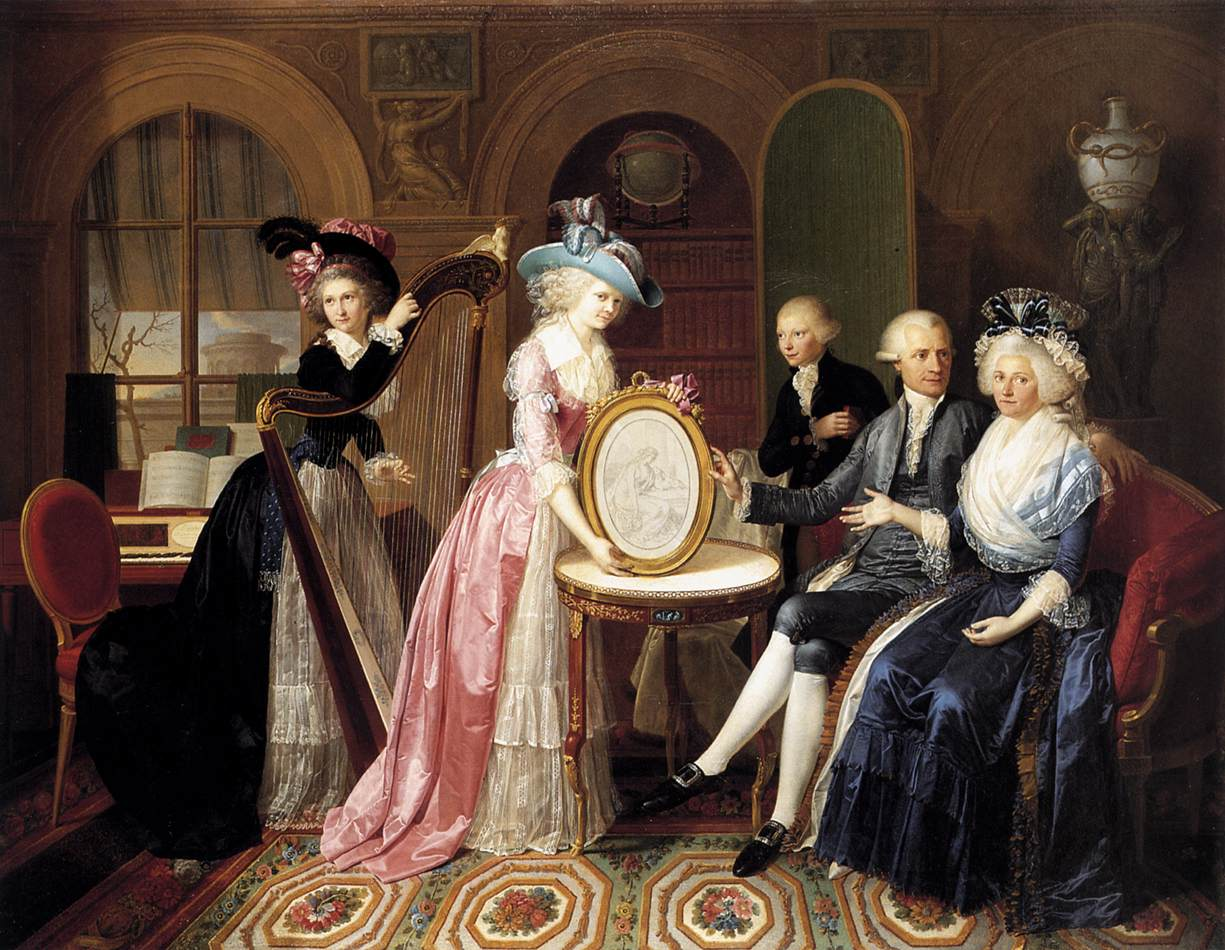
Portrait of the Villers Family, 1790, now in the Groeningemuseum

Jean-Bernard Duvivier (Bruges, 1762 – Paris, 1837) was a painter and drawer of portraits and historical and religious subjects, a book illustrator and a professor at the Normal School in Paris. After having been instructed by Hubert and Paul de Cock and Suvée, he studied in Italy for six years. His style is characterised by balanced composition, lifelike drawing and bright colours.

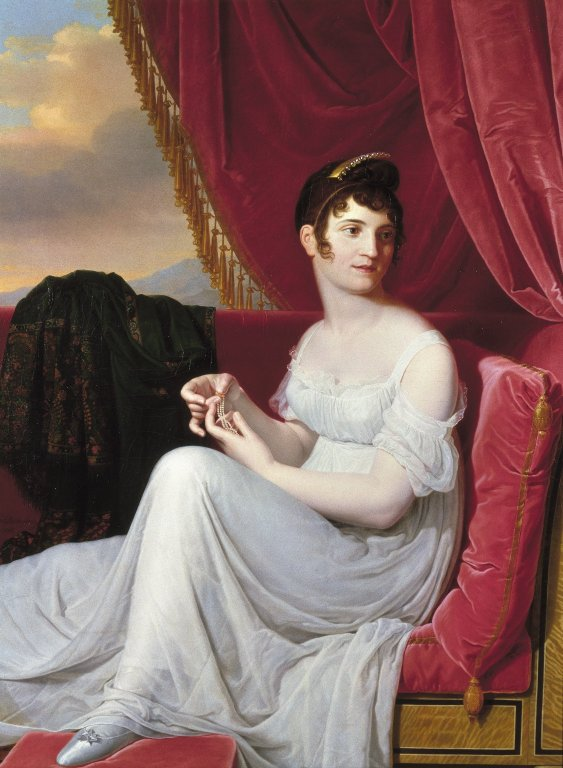
Portrait of Madame Tallien, ca. 1806, now in the Brooklyn Museum

== Paintings ==
- Horatius kills his Sister Camilla, 1785, Le Mans, Musée de Tessé
- Cleopatra Captured by Roman Soldiers after the Death of Mark Antony, 1789, Rochester, Memorial Art Gallery of the University of Rochester
- Portrait of the Family Villers, 1790, Bruges, Groeningemuseum
- Portrait of a Noble Woman, 1806, Brooklyn Museum
- Scene of Deluge, Besançon, Musée des Beaux-Arts et d'Archéologie

== Drawings ==
- The Funeral of Hector, 1793, Brussels, Royal Museum of Fine Arts of Belgium
- Portrait of François Maine de Biran, 1798, location unknown
- Troyan Soldier, 1800-1801, Orléans, Musée des Beaux-Arts
