= Jean-François Legillon =

French painter

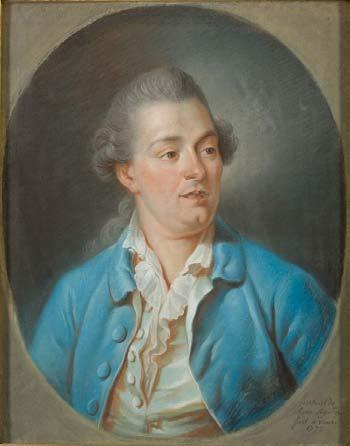
Self-portrait (1772)

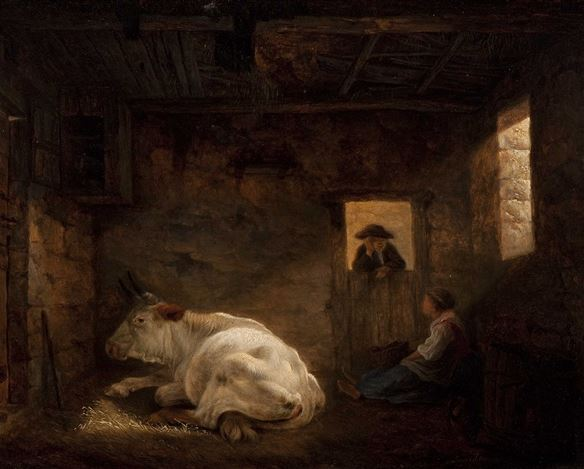
A Cow and a Milkmaid, Resting in the Stable

Jean-François Legillon, originally Jan Frans (1 September 1739 – 23 November 1797) was a Flemish painter who specialized in scenes with cattle. His name is sometimes written as Le Gillon.

== Biography ==
Born in Bruges, he was educated at a Jesuit school and showed an early aptitude for drawing. At the age of twelve, he was already taking lessons at the Brugse Academie, directed by Matthias de Visch. In 1760, he went to Rouen to attend the Académie des Sciences, Belles-lettres et Arts, which had been established by Jean-Baptiste Descamps in 1749. Within two years, he was earning awards at school exhibitions. While there, he also perfected his command of French. Illness interrupted his studies, but he resumed them in 1763 and was back in Bruges by 1766.

He was there for only a year, however, before he left for France again; this time passing through Paris on his way to Marseille, where he took further lessons. Drawing troops of goats that roamed the streets there gave him the idea to become an animal painter. From 1770 to 1772, he visited Rome, where he created numerous watercolors and pastels. He toured Italy from 1772 to 1774, then returned to Paris, where he held his first exhibition at the Salon of 1775 at the Louvre.

He was back in Bruges by 1776 and took some students: Gerardus de San, Jean Charles Verbrugge (1756-1831) and N. van de Steene, about whom nothing is known. It was during this period that he first began to paint in oils. In 1779, he became restless again and travelled through Switzerland until 1780. He settled permanently in Paris in 1782. By 1789, at the insistence of friends, he had prepared some works for reception into the Académie royale de peinture et de sculpture.

After a brief but serious illness, he died in Paris in 1797, while the Revolution was at its height. An old friend from his time in Italy, Joseph-Benoît Suvée, arranged for all of his paintings, drawings and sketches to be sent to his family in Bruges.
