= Hubert de Cock =

Dutch painter (1733–1810)

Hubertus De Cock
- Born: 4 June 1733; Bruges, Dutch Republic
- Died: 12 July 1810 (aged 77)
- Education: Bruges Academy of Fine Arts
- Known for: Painting, Bas-relief
- Notable work: Landscape painting, Jewelry design
- Movement: Neoclassicism
- Relatives: Paul de Cock (brother)

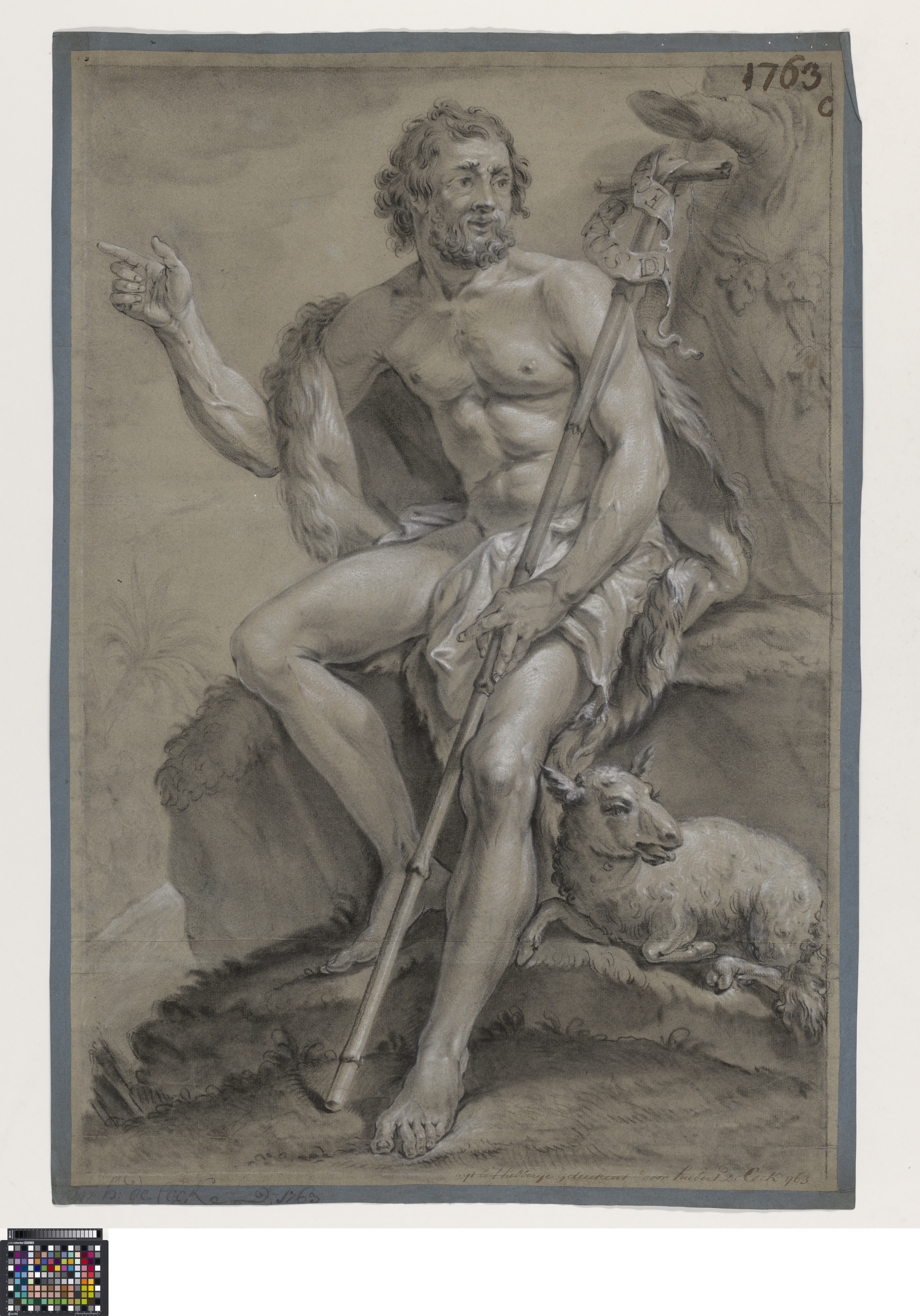
Drawing by De Cock, part of the Musea Brugge collection.

Hubertus “Hubert” De Cock (4 June 1733 – 12 July 1810) was a Dutch painter who lived and worked in Bruges (nowadays Belgium).

== Biography ==
De Cock was born in Bruges as the son of Philippe De Cock and Thérèse Cambier, and the brother of painter and architect Paul de Cock. He studied at the Bruges Academy of Fine Arts from the age of nine, where he studied painting under the direction of Matthias de Visch from 1746. De Cock primarily created bas-relief sculptures and copied paintings.

As a painter, he had a strong sense of composition, worked meticulously, and was known for his refinement. One example of his work can be found in the protected house "De Helm" at Ezelstraat 10-12, an impressive Neoclassical building in the city center of Bruges. The house contains a salon decorated with idyllic landscape paintings by Hubertus De Cock.

He also created designs for jewelry for goldsmiths. For around twenty years, De Cock ran his own drawing school. After his marriage, he and his wife ran a wool trade as well as a business selling prints and paintings.
