= Woryny =

- Village
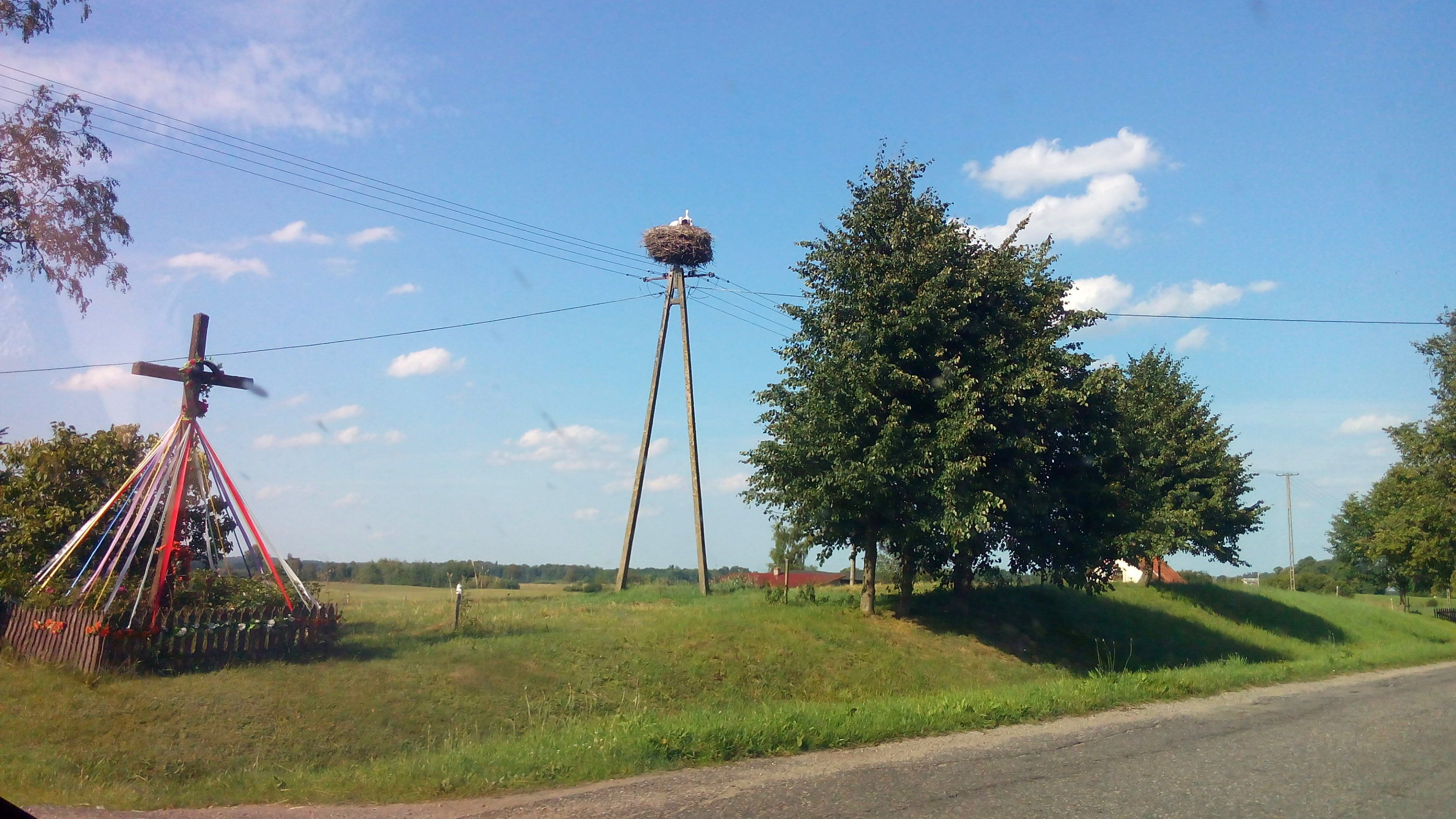
- Wood storks nest in Woryny

- Location within Poland
- Coordinates: 54°18′31″N 20°34′12″E
- Country: Poland
- Voivodeship: Warmian-Masurian
- County: Bartoszyce
- Gmina: Górowo Iławeckie

Woryny [vɔˈrɨnɨ] (German: Worienen) is a village in the administrative district of Gmina Górowo Iławeckie, within Bartoszyce County, Warmian-Masurian Voivodeship, in northern Poland, close to the border with the Kaliningrad Oblast of Russia.

== History ==
On the south-west edge of the village there are traces of a settlement known as Góra Zamkowa (Castle Hill), most likely what was described in medieval documents as Woria or Wore, existing in the pre-Teutonic Knights period. The stronghold in Woryny took advantage of the defensive qualities of being situated at the top of a hill overlooking a stream. The two-part settlement is separated by a dry moat and was most likely inhabited only in one part, with farm animals kept in the second fragment.

Throughout the Napoleonic Battle of Eylau in February 1807 the French generals Nicolas Dahlmann (General Colonel, Commandant des chasseur à cheval de la Garde Impériale francaise) and Jean-Joseph Ange d'Hautpoul were buried at the manor house of Worienen but later exhumed and transferred to France.
