= Jean-Joseph Ange d'Hautpoul =

Napoleonic general

Jean Joseph Ange d'Hautpoul
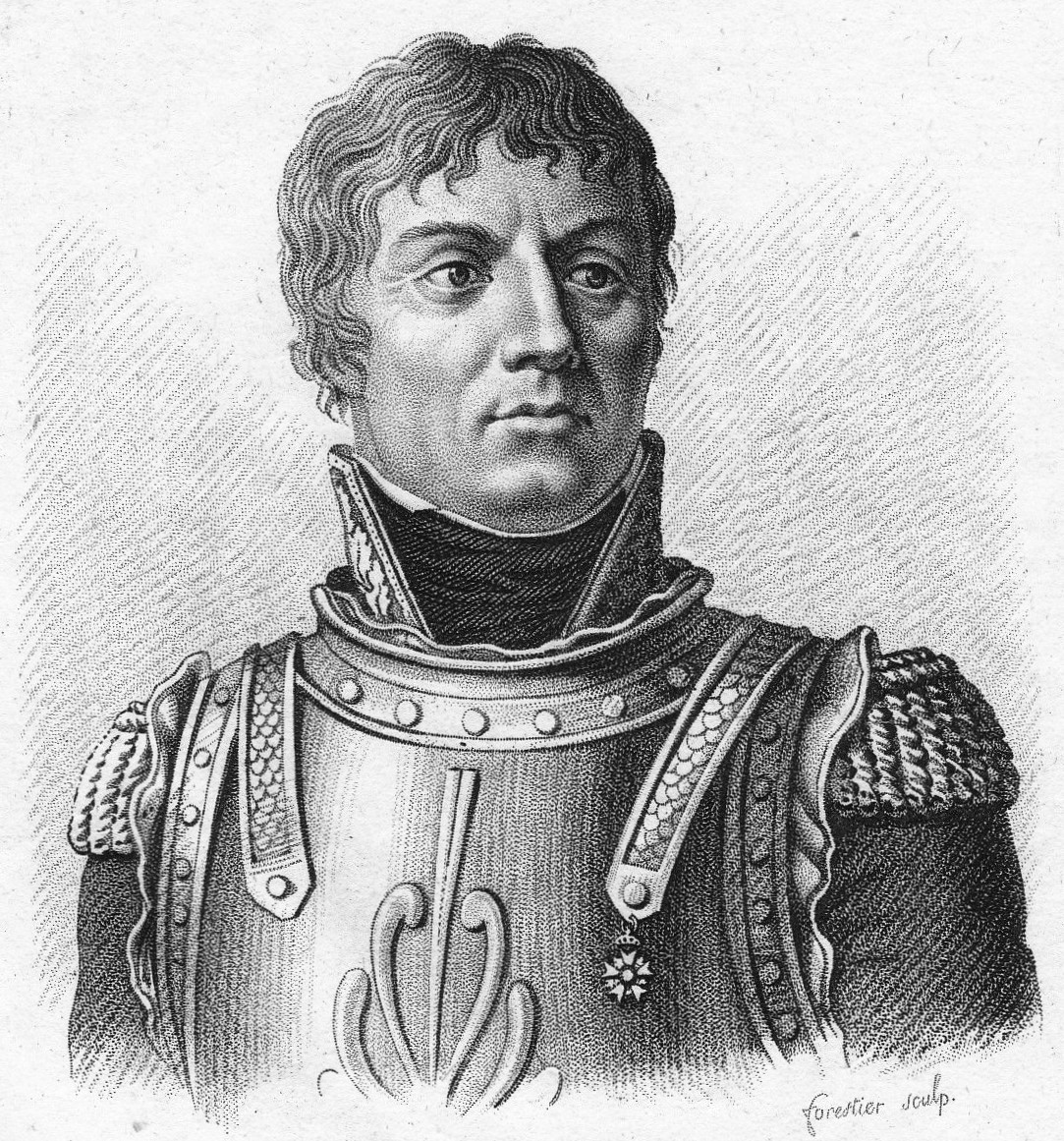
- Born: 13 May 1754; Château de Salette, Cahuzac-sur-Vère, France
- Died: 14 February 1807 (aged 52); Eylau, Prussia
- Military career
- Allegiance: France
- Branch: French Army
- Service years: 1771–1807
- Rank: Général de division
- Conflicts: French Revolutionary Wars; Napoleonic Wars
- Awards: Member of the Legion of Honour (11 December 1803); Grand Officer of the Légion d'honneur (14 June 1804); Grand Eagle of the Légion d'honneur (8 February 1806)
- Other work: Sénat conservateur

Signature
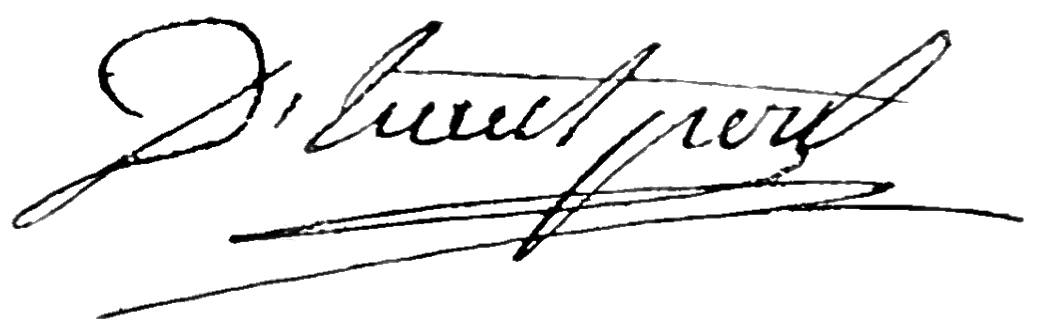

Jean-Joseph Ange d'Hautpoul (French pronunciation: [ʒɑ̃ ʒozɛf ɑ̃ʒ dopul]; 13 May 1754 – 14 February 1807) was a French cavalry general of the Napoleonic Wars. He came from an old noble family of France whose military tradition extended for several centuries.

Efforts by the French Revolutionary government to remove him from his command failed when his soldiers refused to give him up. A big, loud-voiced man, he led from the front of his troops. Although the failure of his cavalry to deploy at the Battle of Stockach (1799) resulted in a court martial, he was exonerated and went on to serve in the Swiss campaign in 1799, at the Second Battle of Stockach, the Battle of Biberach, and later at Battle of Hohenlinden. He served under Michel Ney and Joachim Murat; he was killed in Murat's massive cavalry charge of the Battle of Eylau in 1807.

== Early life ==
Born in an ancient noble family from the Languedoc, he entered the French royal army as a volunteer in 1769. After having served in the Corsican legion, he transferred in 1771 to a Dragoon regiment. From 1777, he served as an officer in the Dragoon Regiment of the Languedoc. By 1792, he had become its colonel.

In 1802, he married Alexandrine Daumy, and they had one child, born 29 May 1806, named Alexandre Joseph Napoléon. His cousin, Alphonse Henri, comte d'Hautpoul, also served in the Napoleonic Wars, as a lieutenant in the Iberian peninsula, and was taken prisoner at the Battle of Salamanca. He later became the 28th prime minister of France, from 1849–1851.

== Revolutionary Wars ==
By contemporary accounts, d'Hautpoul was a big man, possibly taller than Joachim Murat, who was nearly six feet tall. Endowed with broad shoulders and a big voice, he spoke the language of the common soldier, and led from the front. Early in the French Revolution, commissioners visited the various regiments to weed out dangerous, and prospectively traitorous nobles; generally, the commissioners cowed the army into submission, but d'Hautpoul's cavalry regiment refused to be intimidated. When the commissioners came for their colonel, a scion of impoverished nobility, his soldiers refused to give him up: "No d'Hautpoul, no 6th Chasseurs." Thus, despite his noble birth, at the exhortations of his soldiers he remained in the French Revolutionary Army.

d'Hautpoul served in the 1794–1799 campaigns against the armies of the First and Second Coalitions. In April 1794, d'Hautpoul was promoted in the field to general of brigade and he commanded the brigade under both Jacques Desjardin and his successor, François Séverin Marceau-Desgraviers. After the battle of Fleurus, his unit was transferred to the division of François Joseph Lefebvre. In June 1795, his provisional rank of general of brigade was made permanent by the Committee of Public Safety. He distinguished himself in a fight at Blankenberge on 13 September 1795. In June 1796, d'Hautpoul was promoted to general of division and inspector of the cavalry. At Altenkirchen, he was wounded in the shoulder by a musket ball.

After his recovery, d'Hautpoul was given command of the heavy cavalry of the Army of Sambre-et-Meuse under General Paul Grenier. After Neuwied, he was transferred to the Army of England under the command of Lazare Hoche. When the French Directory abandoned the idea of an invasion of England, he was again deployed on the German front, this time as part of the Army of the Danube. After the French loss at the Battle of Ostrach, his Cavalry reserve protected the French retreat from Pfullendorf. A few days later, after failing to lead a timely charge at the Battle of Stockach, he was suspended on orders of the Army commander, Jean-Baptiste Jourdan, who blamed d'Hautpoul for the defeat. Acquitted by a court-martial in Strasbourg, d'Hautpoul resumed his duties at the end of July 1799, having missed the critical actions at the First Battle of Zurich.

In 1799, d'Hautpoul commanded cavalry brigades under Ney, Lecourbe and Baraguey d'Hilliers in the rest of the campaign in northeastern Switzerland. In the German campaign of 1800, he served under Moreau and distinguished himself at the battles of Biberach and Hohenlinden, during which his heavy cavalry was instrumental in disrupting the Austrian infantry defenses.

== Napoleonic wars ==
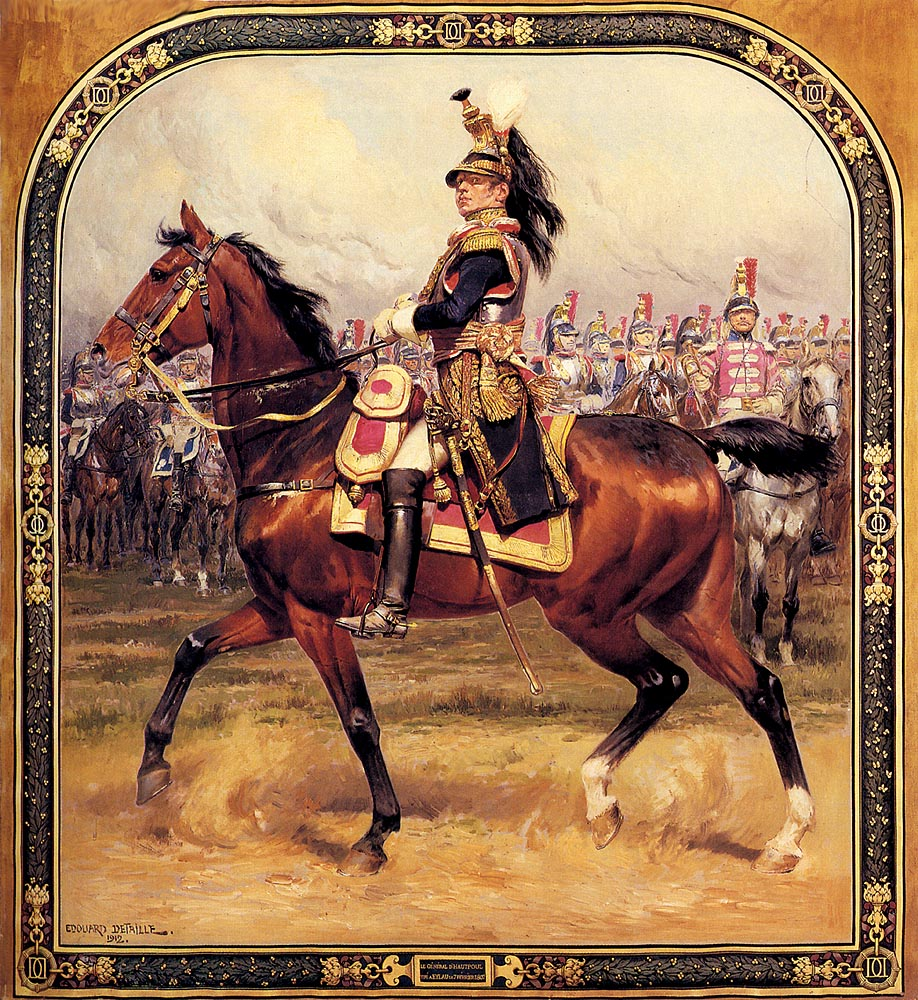
Le Général d'Hautpoul à cheval by Édouard Detaille, 1912

In July 1801, First Consul Bonaparte appointed d'Hautpoul as inspector-general of the cavalry and then awarded him command of the cavalry in the camps of Compiègne and Saint-Omer. In August 1805, d'Hautpoul was given command of the 2nd division of cuirassiers under Joachim Murat. At Austerlitz, d'Hautpoul distinguished himself by leading his heavy cavalry into the Russian center at the Pratzen heights, breaking the infantry squares. In 1804, Napoleon made him a grand officer (grand cordon) of the Légion d'honneur and a senator, which carried with it an annual income of 20,000 francs.

In the War of the Fourth Coalition, d'Hautpoul served at Jena and in the capture of Lübeck. Transferred to the Corps of Marshal Bessières in December 1806, he again served under Murat in the maneuvers in East Prussia in the Winter of 1807.

=== Battle of Eylau ===
When military activity resumed in the winter of 1807, Napoleon hoped to overwhelm a Russian rearguard at Hof near Eylau, which was called "Preußisch Eylau" (and is now within the borders of the Russian Kaliningrad Oblast). He ordered his dragoons to take a bridge; they failed and suffered severe casualties. D'Hautpoul and his cuirassiers—heavy cavalry of big men on big horses—thundered over the bridge and scattered the Russian rearguard. As the retreating infantry fled, d'Hautpoul's cuirassiers captured four guns and two standards. Napoleon was so pleased with d'Hautpoul and his cuirassiers that he embraced the six-foot man in front of his division the next day. In his own turn, d'Hautpoul was so pleased that he announced first, to have such a compliment, he must be willing to die for his emperor, and second, to his troops: "The Emperor has embraced me on behalf of all of you. And I am so pleased with you that I kiss all your arses."

The pursuit of the Russian troops continued. On 7 February 1807, the French arrived outside the village of Eylau, as night was falling. In some confusion, the Imperial coach rumbled into the village, although the Emperor was setting up his camp a few kilometers away. The Russian patrol in the village chased off the coach driver and his men and plundered the Emperor's belongings; in turn, the Imperial escort chased them off. More and more men were sent into the engagement, and in the end the French took the village when the Russians withdrew. Both sides lost 4,000 men in the contest for the village and the Emperor's nightshirt. Settling for the night, they prepared to engage the next day.

The next morning, the two armies of unequal strength faced each other across frozen fields fissured by ice-covered streams and ponds, which were in turn covered by snow and drifts. The snow and gloom meant that neither side was aware of the inequalities of men and artillery. Napoleon opened the engagement by sending Soult's's corps, which successfully pushed the Russian right flank back, nearly turning the Russian force. To follow up on this success, he ordered Pierre Augereau's force to attack the left-center. No sooner had Augereau and VII Corps, plus St. Hilaire's division, sallied out when a sudden snow storm engulfed the battlefield. In white-out conditions, Augereau's entire corps disappeared in a flurry of whirling snow. When the snow cleared, friend and foe alike discovered that the first units onto the field had wandered off course. The line of march should have taken them directly to the Russian flank; have no point of reference, they had instead followed the terrain and led the entire corps parallel to the Russian line, along with a V-shaped formation in which the left and center merged, and directly into the face of the Russian 70–gun batteries. The artillery, although shocked to find a French Corps advancing straight toward them, immediately opened fire, as did the Russian infantry on both sides of Augereau's corps.

The result was devastating. Five thousand French soldiers fell in a matter of minutes and the entire engagement stood on the brink of disaster. Not only did they face the Russian fire, but the French artillery pounded them as well. Augereau's Corps melted under the withering fire, the bayonets of the Russians, and the onslaught of the cavalry; as they retreated to their own lines, Napoleon was nearly captured at the Eylau churchyard, where he had established a lookout post, but his escort cavalry chased the Russians away.

==== Charge at Eylau ====
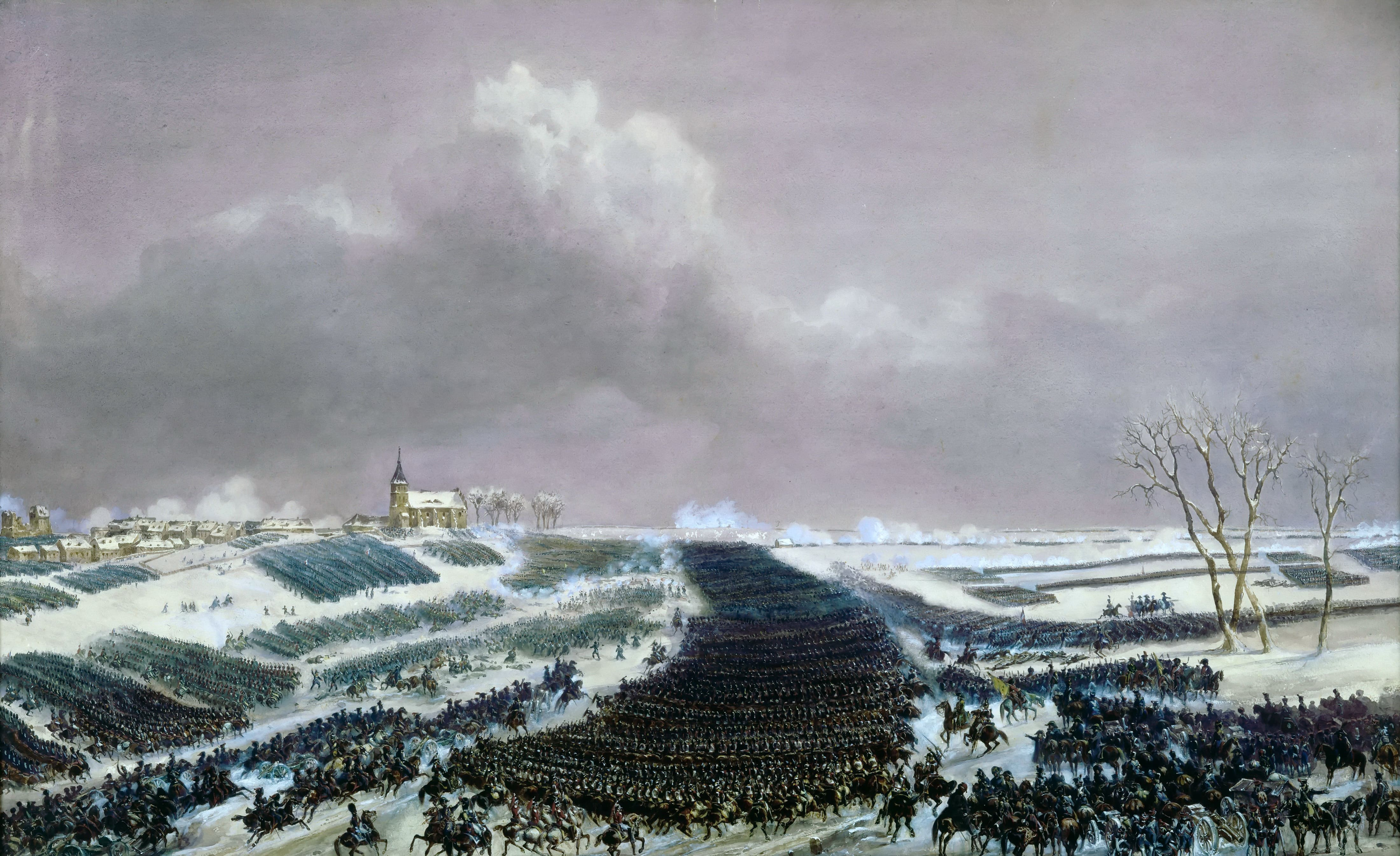
At the Battle of Eylau, Murat's 10,700-man cavalry charged the Russian lines. D'Hautpoul himself led three charges into the Russian infantry squares.

To fill the breach left by Augereau's decimated corps, Napoleon ordered Murat's cavalry reserve, 80 squadrons of 10,700 cavalrymen, into action at 10:30 in the morning. They had to cover 2,500 yards (2,300 m) of snow-covered, obstacle-filled ground, which they could not do at a gallop. Murat's Reserve charged into the Russian squares in two columns: Grouchy's cavalry, d'Hautpoul's cuirassiers and General Louis Lepic's grenadiers—24 squadrons in total—were flank to flank when they hit the Russian center. This was the occasion of Lepic's famous comment, "Heads up, by God! those are bullets, not turds!" Grouchy, Lepic, and d'Hautpoul's horse broke the center, wheeled, and charged a second time. On the second charge, they broke the second formation of squares; at this point, Grouchy's men were forced back, but d'Hautpoul's cuirassiers pounded forward, reaching the Russian reserve.

At this point, the horses were nearly blown, but d'Hautpoul's cuirassiers charged the third line, which they also broke. The Russian Cossacks, assembled in the reserve, entered the melee, but their light horses were no match for the French mounts, big horses confiscated from the Prussians the previous year. The Russian infantry had started to reform their squares behind d'Hautpoul's men. During this charge, d'Hautpoul was struck by artillery grapeshot and badly wounded. Several of his men managed to carry or drag him back to French lines.

Napoleon's valet recounted:

... I seem still to hear the brave d'Hautpoul saying to His Majesty, just as he was galloping off to charge the enemy: "Sire, I am going to show you my big heels; they will go into the enemies' squares as if they were made of butter!" An hour later he was dead. One of his regiments while fighting in an interval of the Russian army, was shot down and cut to pieces by the Cossacks; only eighteen of them escaped. General d'Hautpoul, three times forced to recoil with his division, thrice rallied them to the charge; the third time, he again rushed on the enemy, crying in a loud voice: "Cuirassiers, forward, in the name of God! [F]orward, my brave cuirassiers!" But grapeshot had mowed down too many of these heroes. Very few of them were in condition to follow their leader, who fell, covered with wounds, in the middle of a Russian square into which he had flung himself almost alone.

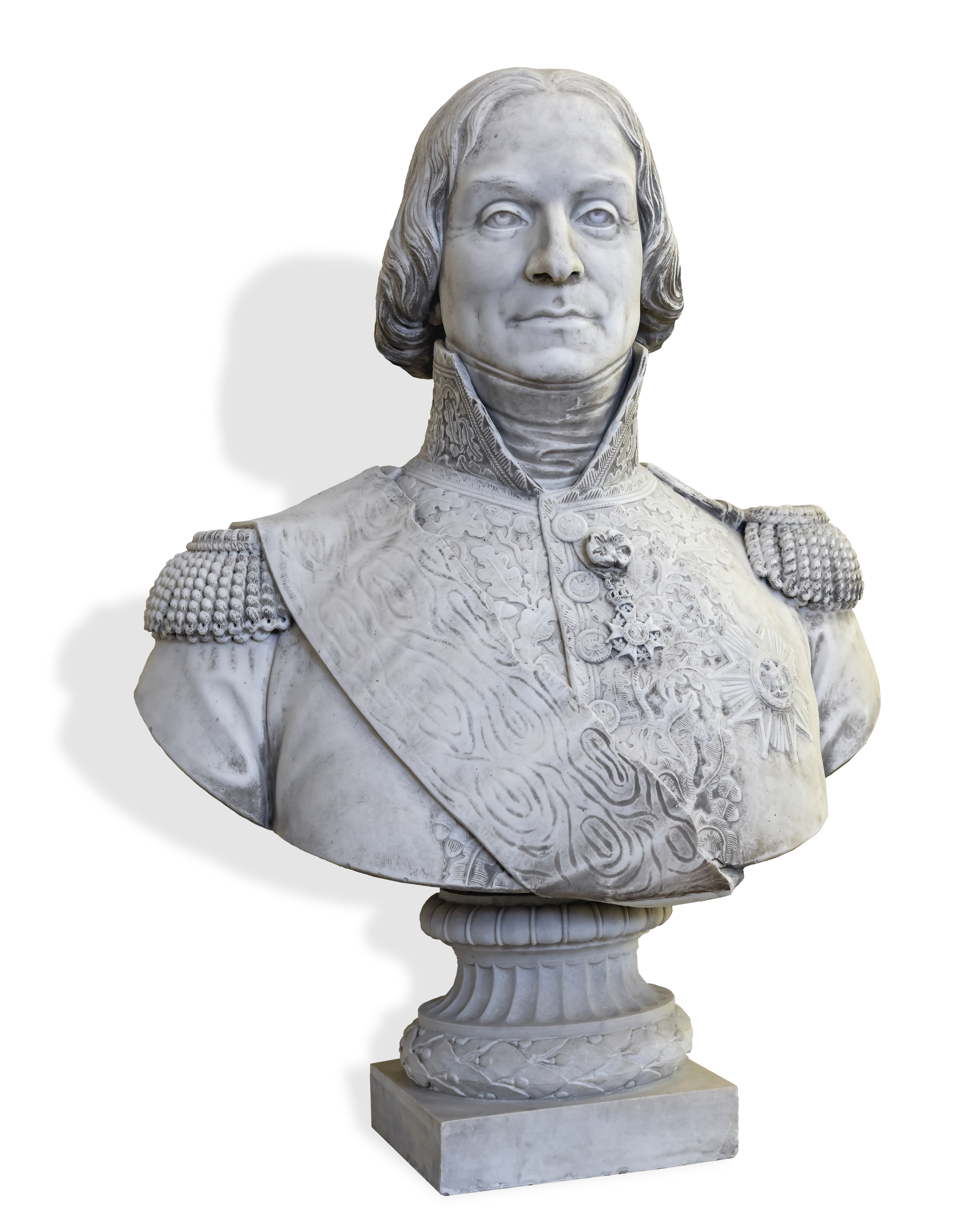
Bust statue of General Jean-Joseph Ange d'Hautpoul.

The Emperor ordered the best surgeons to attend to d'Hautpoul, but they disagreed on the best method of treatment. Against the advice of the military surgeon, Larrey, d'Hautpoul refused to have his leg amputated and died not long afterwards.

There is some disagreement in the records about his actual date of death: the original death record of the parish at Eylau indicates he died of wounds on 1 February 1807, but this was before the battle, and it is possible that the pastor simply left off a digit in his record, or, more likely, that the record was transcribed incorrectly. Other records suggest that he died the day after the battle (8 February), on 11 February, or on 14 February. Originally buried at Worienen, His son, Alexandre Joseph Napoléon, brought his remains to France in 1840 to be buried in the family crypt at the Père Lachaise Cemetery in Paris. D'Hautpoul's heart is conserved in a vault in Les Invalides, and his name is inscribed on Column 16 of the Arc de Triomphe, among the first 384 names to be inscribed on it.

== See also ==
- Names inscribed under the Arc de Triomphe, Eastern pillar, column 16
