= Charles-Auguste van den Berghe =

French painter

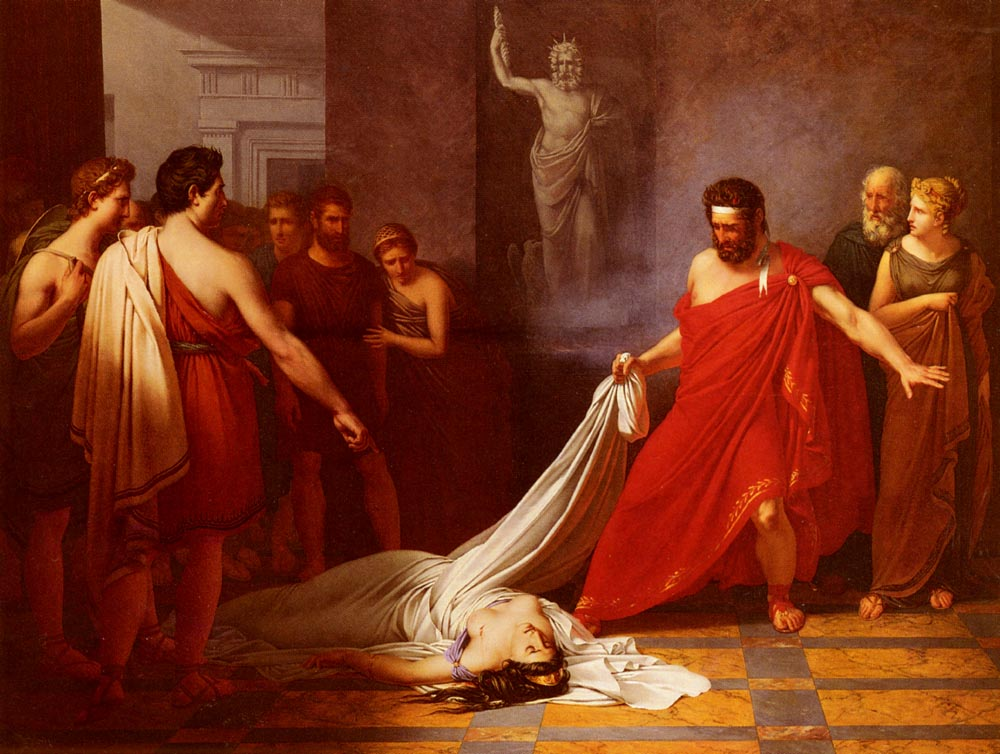
Aegisthus discovers the body of Clytemnestra, his entry for the Prix de Rome competition in 1823, for which he won 3rd place

Charles-Auguste van den Berghe (1798–1853), was a French painter.

He was born in Beauvais as the son of Augustin van den Berghe and became the pupil of Anne-Louis Girodet de Roussy-Trioson.

He died in Paris.
