= Gertrude de Pélichy =

Gertrude de Pelichy
- Born: 26 August 1743; Utrecht
- Died: 6 March 1825 (aged 81); Bruges

Gertrude Cornélie Marie de Pélichy (1743 – 1825) was a painter from the Northern Netherlands active in Paris and Bruges.

Pelichy was born in Utrecht but moved with her family in 1753 to Bruges. She became the pupil of the painter Paul de Cock, and in 1767 she travelled to Paris where she became the pupil of the painter Joseph-Benoît Suvée. She is known for portraits and religious works. Pélichy died in Bruges.

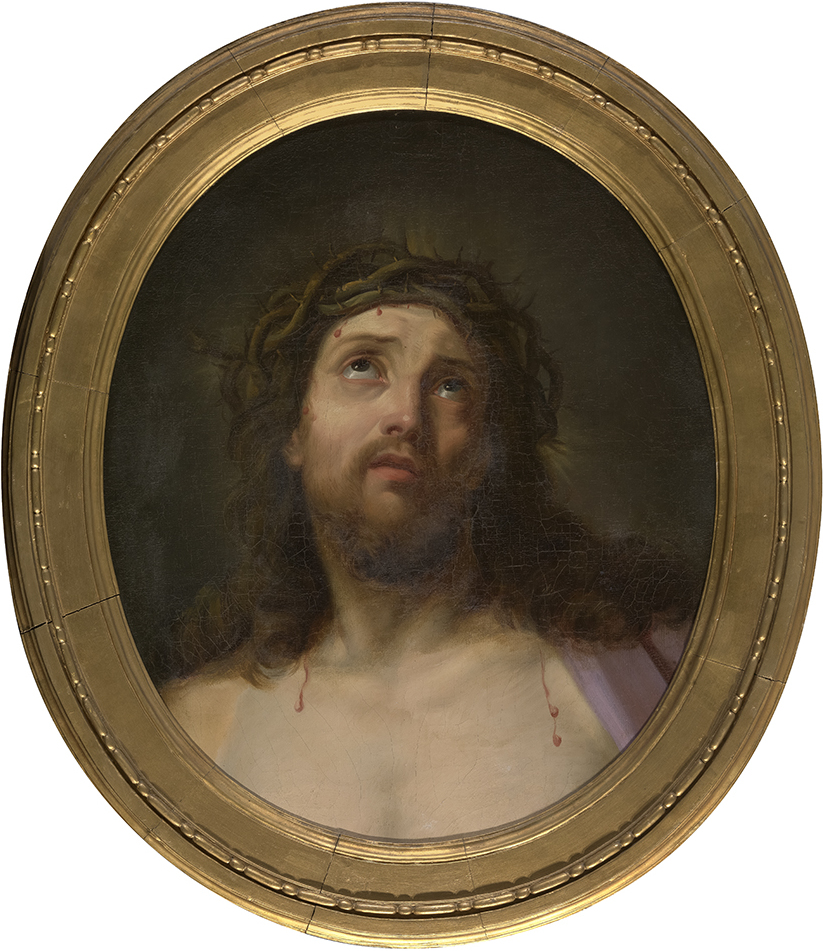
Ecce Homo, 1776, Groeningemuseum

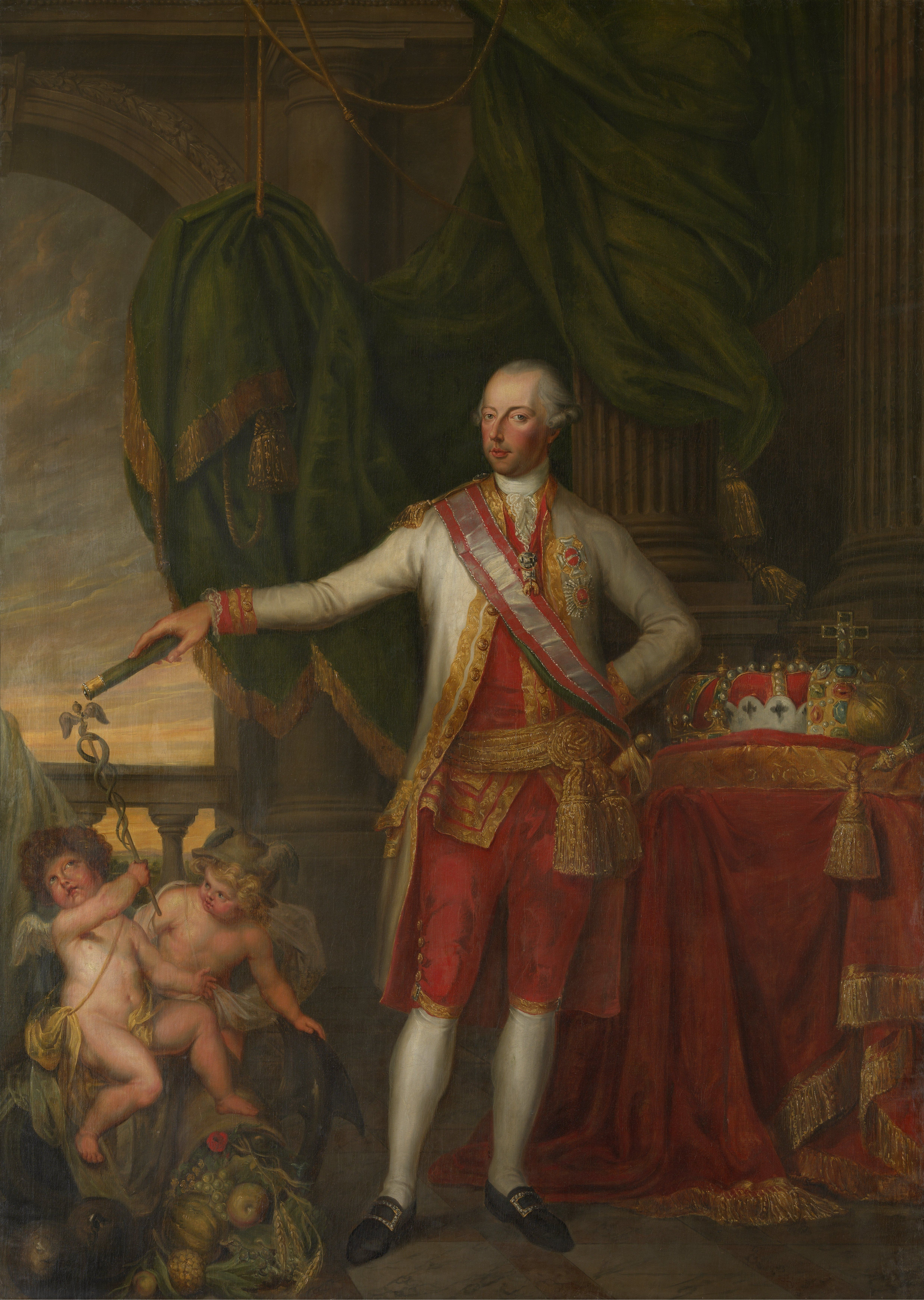
Portrait of the Emperor Joseph II, ca. 1784, Groeningemuseum

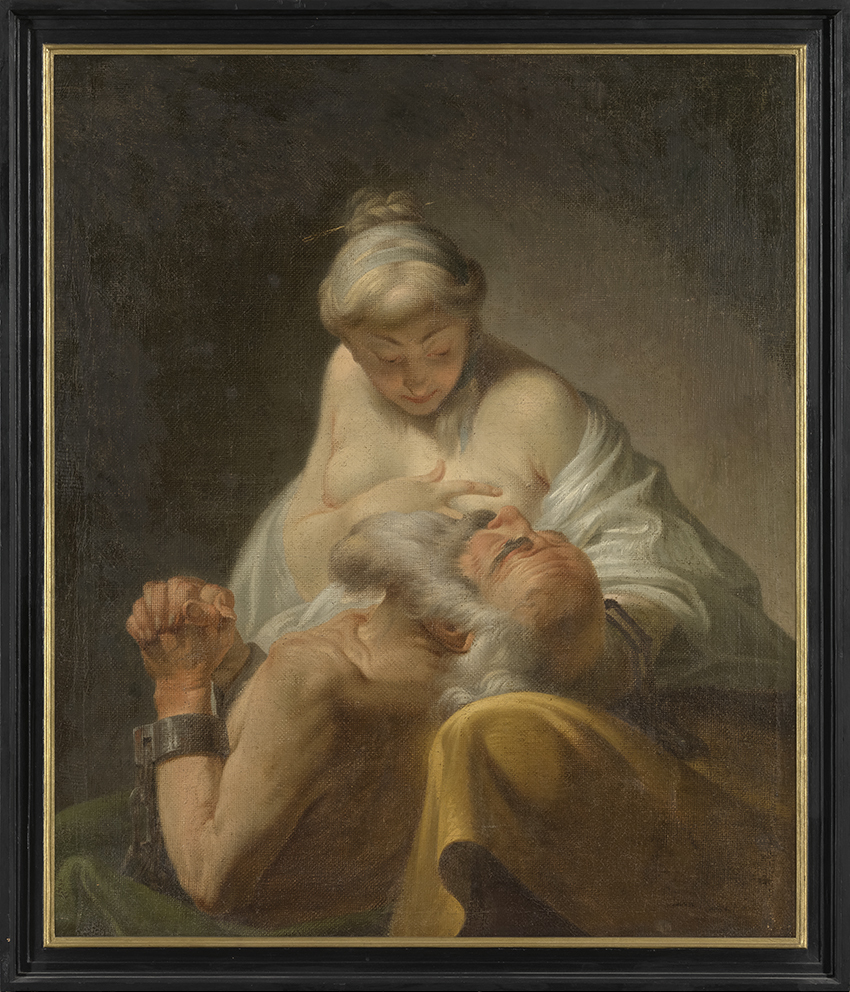
Caritas Romana, Groeningemuseum
