= Albert Gregorius =

Flemish-Belgian painter

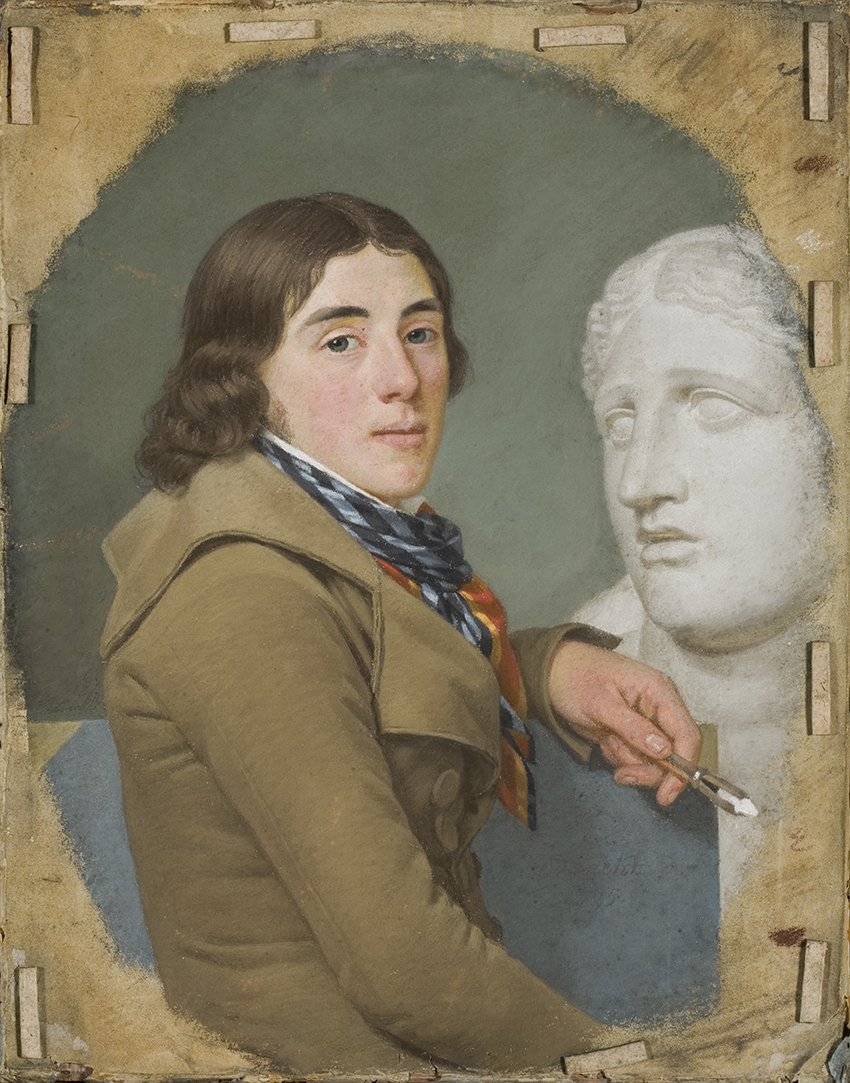
- Portrait by François van der Donckt, 1795
- Born: 26 October 1774
- Died: 25 February 1853 (aged 78)
- Education: Trained by François van der Donckt and Joseph-Benoît Suvée
- Known for: Portrait painting

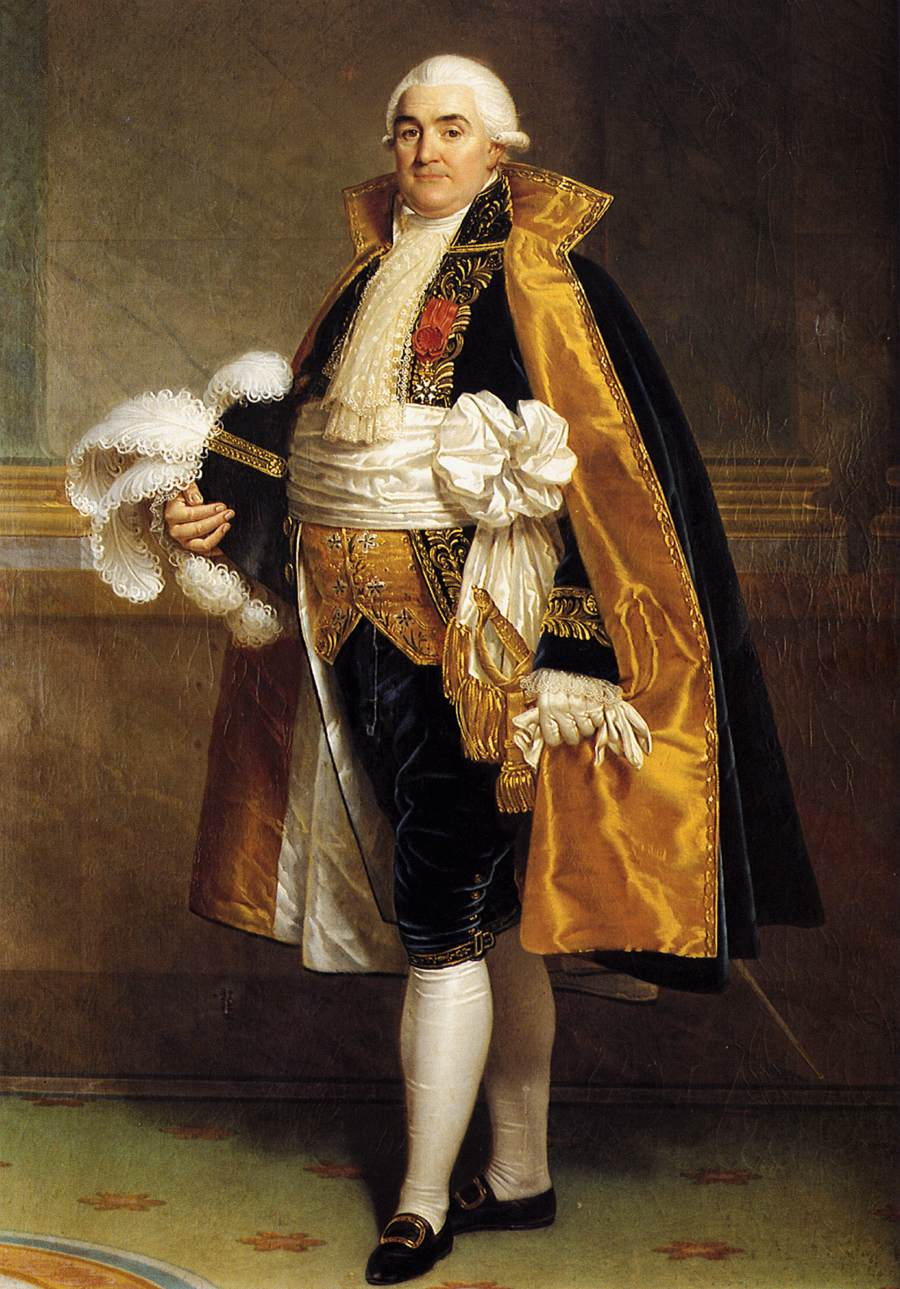
Portrait of Count Charles Antoine Chasset, a member of the Sénat conservateur and envoyé extraordinaire to Metz (1813)

Albert Jacob Frans Gregorius, or Albert Jacques François Grégorius (26 October 1774 – 25 February 1853) was a Flemish-Belgian portrait painter and Director of the art academy in Bruges.

== Biography ==
He was born into a poor, laboring family. His drawing abilities were observed by François van der Donckt, a local portrait painter who took him in, gave him his first lessons and helped him enroll at the art academy. Gregorius was there from 1791 to 1793 and won several awards.

In 1801, he went to Paris, where he was apprenticed to Joseph-Benoît Suvée, who was also from Bruges. Not long after, Suvée went to Rome to become Director of the French Academy, but Gregorius was able to find a position in the studios of Jacques-Louis David. In 1805, he was back in Bruges, making preparations to enter the Prix de Rome, but fell ill and was unable to participate.

After his recovery, he returned to Paris and remained until 1835. He soon established a reputation as a portrait painter and formed an association with other expatriate Flemish artists ("De Club van de Belgen"). After exhibiting in the Ghent Salon, he entered the Paris Salon in 1812 and would continue to display there annually until his departure. In addition to the usual French nobility, he is also known for his portrait of August Wilhelm Schlegel, which is now on display at Coppet Castle.

At the age of 61, he received an appointment as Director of "De Vrije Academie" (now "De Stedelijke Academie") in Bruges. He served until 1852, when he was forced to resign after clashes with colleagues, students and city officials over his conservative approach to art. His best-known student was Ford Madox Brown.

Curiously, on his death certificate he was described as a "widower", but his wife's name was unknown. It has been speculated that he was briefly married during his long stay in France and had no close relatives he cared to notify.

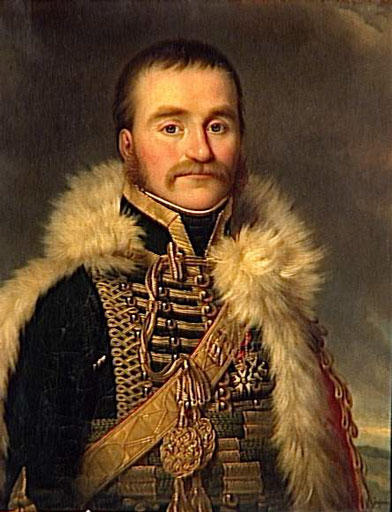
Portrait of General Nicolas Dahlmann (date unknown)

== Sources ==
- "Gregorius, Albert Jacob Frans". In: Allgemeines Lexikon der Bildenden Künstler von der Antike bis zur Gegenwart, Vol.14: Giddens–Gress. E. A. Seemann, Leipzig 1921, pg.580 (Online)
- Gregorius, Albert in: Dictionnaire des peintres belges (Online)
