= Augustin van den Berghe =

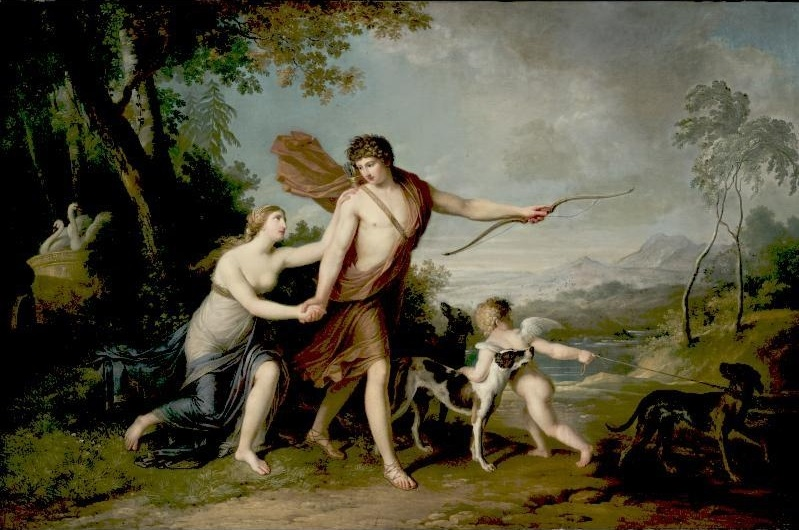
Venus and Adonis

Augustin van den Berghe (1756 – 1836), was a painter born in the Austrian Netherlands.

== Biography ==
He was born in Bruges and became the pupil of Joseph-Benoît Suvée in Paris in 1780. He was the father of Augustin the Younger and is known for historical allegories.

He died in Beauvais.
