= Nicolas Dahlmann =

French general

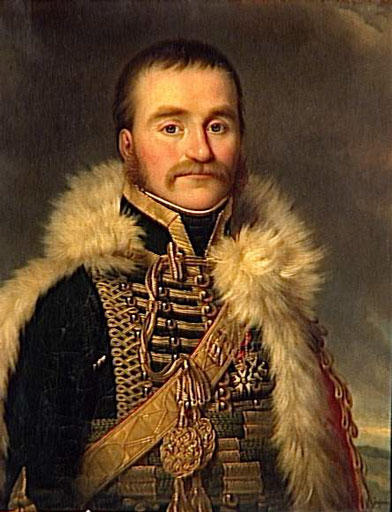
- Portrait by Albert Gregorius
- Born: 7 November 1769; Thionville, France
- Died: 10 February 1807 (aged 37); Pr. Eylau, Prussia
- Military career
- Allegiance: France
- Branch: Cavalry
- Service years: 1777–1807
- Rank: Brigadier General
- Conflicts: French Revolutionary Wars; Napoleonic Wars

Nicolas Dahlmann (French pronunciation: [nikɔlɑ dalmɑn]; 7 November 1769 – 10 February 1807) was a French cavalry general of the Napoleonic Wars.

== Early life ==
Dahlmann was born in Thionville as the son of a trumpeter and enlisted in the French Army in 1777 at the age of 8, where his father and older brother were already serving in the Regiment Dauphin Cavalerie, which later in 1791 became the 12e Régiment de Cavalerie.

== Napoleonic wars ==
Dahlmann served with the infantry and was deployed at the Armee de la Moselle and the Armee des Pyrenees Orientales. He was wounded at his right leg Italie and joined the Guides-a-Cheval de Bonaparte when they were formed in June 1796.

He went to Egypt with the Armee d'Orient and served at Salahieh, modern day El Salheya bordering the Sinai Desert, and Aboukir. He returned to France with Napoleon in 1798 and became Chef d'Escadron of the Chasseurs-a-Cheval in October 1802. He served at Austerlitz and was promoted Colonel-Major of the Chasseurs-a-Cheval de la Garde Imperiale.

Dahlmann saw further action at the Battle of Jena and was promoted to General-de-Brigade in the age of 36.

Throughout the Battle of Eylau in February 1807 he was attached to the Imperial staff but requested to lead his old unit, the Chasseurs à Cheval, in a cavalry charge on 8 February 1807. He was seriously wounded in his right hip from a heavy calibre artillery piece and died on 10 February 1807 in the manor house of Worienen.

Napoleon granted Dahlmann's widow a pension of 6,000 francs and in 1811 accorded his only son the title of Baron de l'Empire at the age of 10. On the instructions of Napoleon, Dahlmann's heart was embalmed and taken to Paris where it was laid to rest in the Pantheon.
