= Césarine Davin-Mirvault =

French artist (1773–1844)

Césarine Henriette Flore Davin-Mirvault
- Born: June 3, 1773; Paris, France
- Died: November 25, 1844 (aged 71); Paris, France
- Known for: Painting

Césarine Henriette Flore Davin-Mirvault (June 3, 1773 – November 25, 1844) was a French artist and painter. She studied under Joseph-Benoît Suvée and Jacques-Louis David, and learned to paint miniatures from Jean-Baptiste Jacques Augustin.

== Biography ==
Césarine Henriette Flore Davin-Mirvault was born in Paris as the daughter of a geographer-engineer, and while her family was not part of the aristocracy it was well connected due to the fact that her godfather was a Count and her godmother a Marquess. She studied painting under Suvée, David, and Augustin, with the latter teaching her to paint portrait miniatures, although she was more focused on learning to teach painting herself.

Davin-Mirvault married an 'inspecteur a Parme' and had two daughters with him. Her husband died in 1824, two years after her final exhibition.

== Career ==
Davin-Mirvault’s career was typical of David’s female students; she was not celebrated during her lifetime, yet she was not completely ignored by critics. Her main focus was portraiture, but she also painted miniatures and genre paintings. Her most renowned work is her Portrait of Antonio Bruni, which is on view at the Frick Collection in New York. Davin-Mirvault exhibited frequently between 1798 and 1822 as recorded in Salon catalogues. She received a medal de deuxiéme classe in the Salon of 1804 for a full length self-portrait. She also received a medal de premiere classe in the Salon of 1814 for one of her entries.

Around the same time as her husband’s death, Davin-Mirvault established a school of drawing and painting for women. Despite the school being well-attended, she died poor in 1844 while living in her oldest daughter’s house.

== Works ==
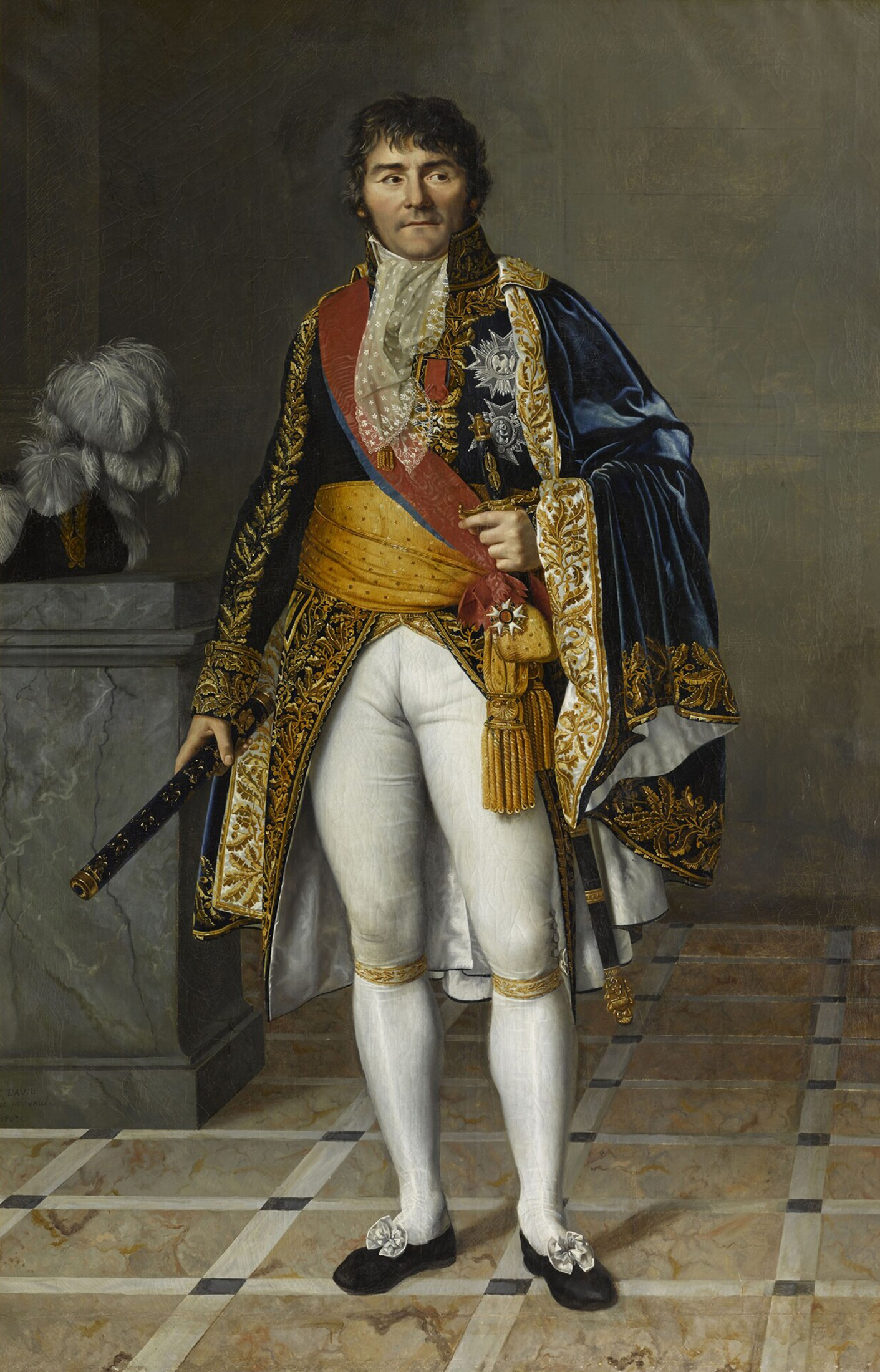
François Joseph Lefebvre, Duke of Dantzig, Marshal of France, portrait from 1807, now at the Palace of Versailles

Most of Davin-Mirvault’s portraits were small-scale as she was accustomed to painting miniatures. Some of the subjects whom she painted in miniature include: 'Citoyenne' Sallatin (the wife of a musician for the Théâtre Feydeau), her teacher Suvée, as well as Napoleon's wife Caroline Bonaparte, and her brother Joachim Murat. Along with miniature portraits, she also painted miniature landscapes, genre scenes, and history scenes. These works include a scene of Hercules titled A Child Preferring Arms to All Other Articles of His Education. A critic praised this work in La Mercure de France, however, he mistakenly thought the artist was a man.

A Young Girl Grieved by the End of "Clarissa" When She Reads the Will is an example of one of Davin-Mirvault’s genre miniatures and was exhibited in the Salon of 1801. She began referring to herself as a student of David after 1804 when her Portrait of Bruni had been exhibited. At this time, Davin-Mirvault stopped exhibiting miniatures most likely as a result of her studies with David giving her a newfound confidence. She then only exhibited portraits, genre paintings, and a single history painting.

Portrait of Bruni is not signed or dated and is painted using muted, dark tones. Great attention is given to the textures of objects within the painting. Bruni is pictured wearing a deep blue coat and tuning a viola. He sits in a dark chair in front of a grey background, with his face, neckcloth, and the upholstery tacks providing bright accents to the darkly painted picture. Bruni’s hair is dusted with powder, which can also be seen on the collar and shoulders of his coat. This is an example of Davin-Mirvault’s “literal-minded all-inclusiveness” that causes issues in some of her other works. The portrait was kept in the collection of Bruni’s descendants until 1952, however, they believed it had been painted by David. In 1952 the portrait was bought by Knoedler and Co. and sold again to the Frick Collection still as a painting by David. The Frick Collection issued a press release on October 7, 1952 stating that the portrait was painted by David basing this attribution on stylistic qualities and the friendship between David and Bruni. However, the portrait was finally correctly attributed to Davin-Mirvault a decade later by Georges Wildenstein who had always suspected it was in fact painted by one of David’s pupils. Wildenstein proved this through the discovery of a listing for the portrait in the Salon Catalogue of 1804. The portrait does look heavily influenced by David due to Davin-Mirvault’s skill at emulating her teacher’s style, especially his precision. Although she did not win an award for the Portrait of Bruni, it was highly praised in her time.

Portrait of François-Joseph Lefebvre, Duc de Dantzig, Maréchal was commissioned in 1804 by Napoleon for the Salles de Maréchaux Tuileries Palace. Davin-Mirvault most likely received this commission because she was supposedly related to Lefebvre. However, the portrait was never exhibited in the Salon. The handling of this portrait seems more primitive when compared to her previous Portrait of Bruni. In addition, the details seem to overpower the subject. However, the portrait has the same precision, impasto highlights and thinly brushed background as the Portrait of Bruni.

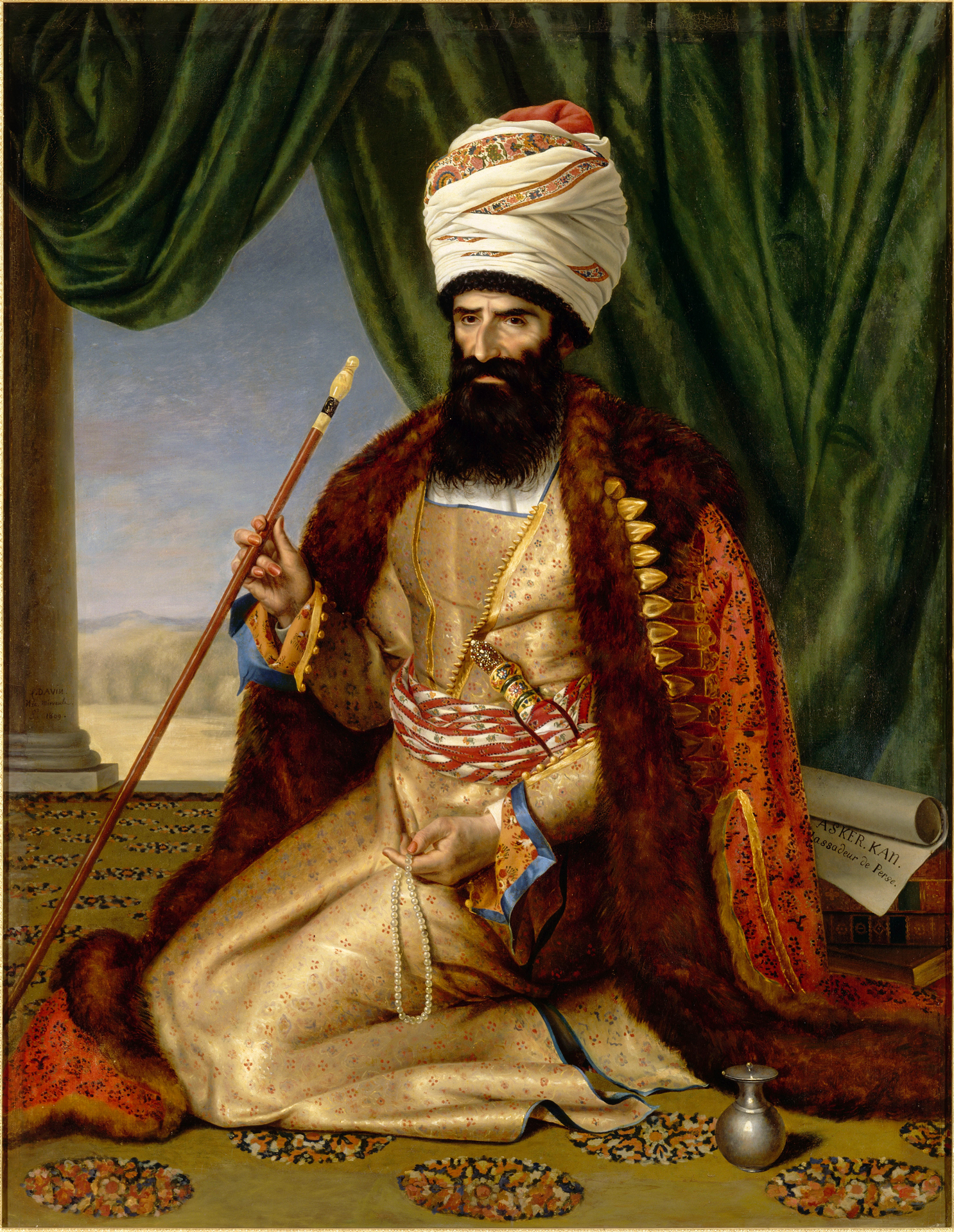
Portrait of Asker-Khan, Ambassador of Persia, from 1809

Portrait of Asker-Khan, Ambassador from Persia in 1808 was exhibited in the Salon of 1810, and her second portrait of the ambassador was exhibited in the Salon of 1814. Louise-Phillipe bought the portrait in 1836 for the Musée de Versailles, where it still remains. The background of the portrait is more architectural than her previous works with a curtain, a column, and a distant landscape. The subject is shown kneeling in prayer on a Persian rug, however, the details are overpowering just as they are in her previous Salon piece. Both the Portrait of Asker-Khan and the Portrait of Lefebvre demonstrate how Davin-Mirvault was accustomed to painting miniatures and was not always as successful at a large scale.

Portrait of Mrs. Pinckney-Horry is painted in an oval shape and looks like an enlarged version of Davin-Mirvault’s miniatures. This portrait is executed differently from her others due to its delicate handling and contours.

Portrait of a Seated Lady demonstrates Davin-Mirvault’s skill at portraying details in a way that is not as overpowering as in some of her other portraits previously discussed. Rather, the intricate decorations of the subject’s clothing compliment her as she sits confidently.

The Beautiful Kitchen Maid was purchased by a prominent collector, Lucien Bonaparte. This work was originally exhibited in the Salon of 1806 with the title The Kitchen Maid and was described as, "one of the best works by a female student of M. David."

The Death of Malek-Adhel was exhibited in the Salon of 1814 and is the only history painting that Davin-Mirvault exhibited. The painting features a dying Hindu nobleman as his lover and father mourn over him. A reviewer for the Salon of 1814 praised Davin-Mirvault for receiving"excellent lessons" from David.

== Sources ==
- "Davin, Césarine Henriette Flore (Mme)". Benezit Dictionary of Artists. 2011.
