= Jan Anton Garemyn =

Flemish painter and engraver (1712–1799)

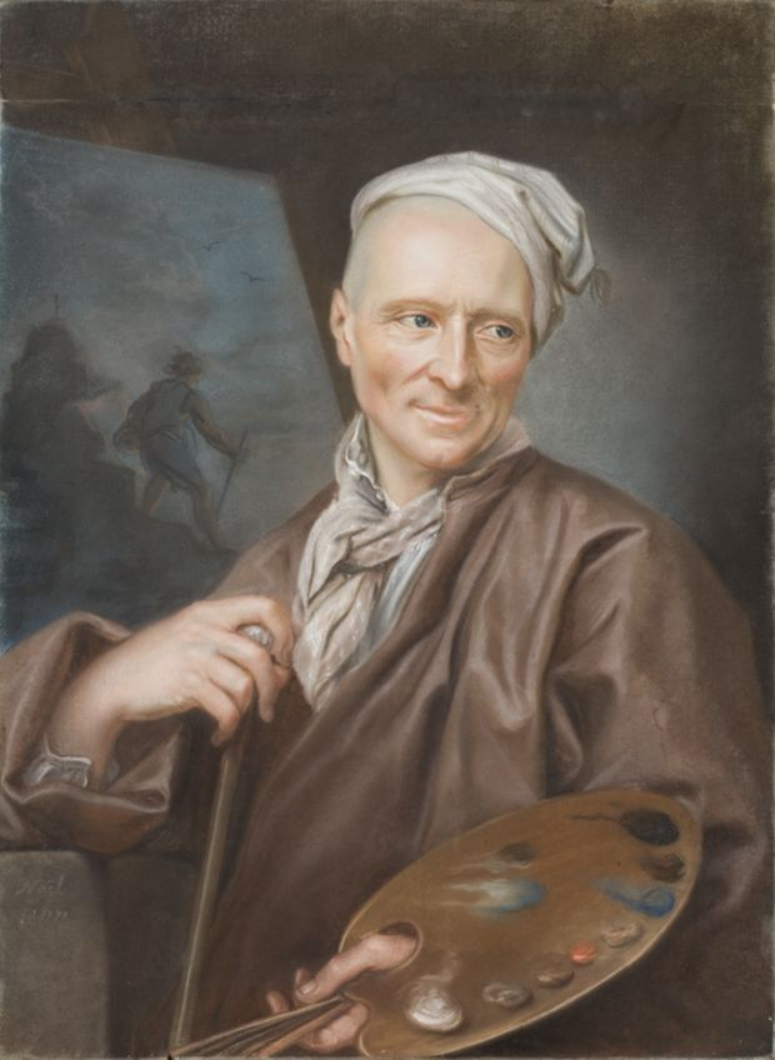
Portrait of Jan Anton Garemijn by Charles-Nicolas Noël, 1771

Jan Anton Garemijn or Jan Anton Garemyn (15 April 1712, Bruges – 23 June 1799, Bruges) was a Flemish painter and engraver and draftsman. He painted biblical subjects, allegorical subjects, genre scenes, rustic scenes, landscapes, portraits and decorative motifs. He is known for his lighthearted depictions of everyday life. As an art teacher and director at the art academy of Bruges, he played an important role in the revival of artistic activity in Bruges.

== Life ==
Garemijn was born in Bruges as the son of Frans Garemijn, a cooper who died when Jan Anton was 7, and Magdalena Missiaens (or Messiaens). He was baptized on 15 April 1712 in the St. Salvator Church of Bruges. He showed early on a talent for drawing. Following his father's death he apprenticed for several years to the sculptor Rochus Aerts. Subsequently he attended the newly established art academy in Bruges where he studied under the painter Jozef Vanden Kerckhove until the latter died in 1724 and the academy ceased to operate effectively. Garemijn then took lessons with the sculptor Hendrick Pulinx, who was one of the promotors of the Academy. He also trained with Lodewijk Roos (Lodewyk Roos), a painter originally from Kortrijk who had moved to Bruges.

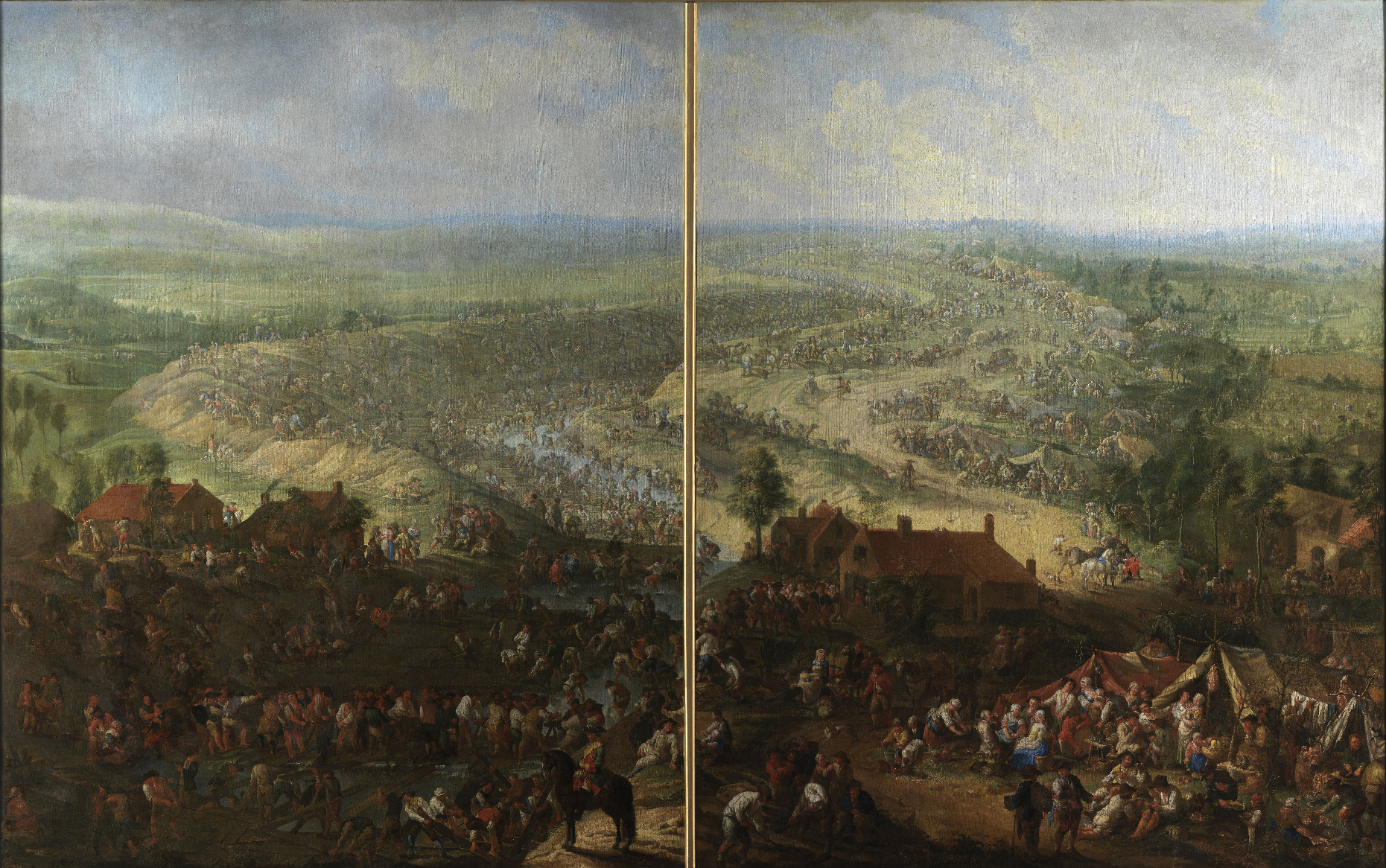
The Digging Out of the Ghent-Bruges Canal

In 1728 Garemijn set up his own workshop. Around this time he came into contact with the genre and portrait painter Jacob Beernaert from Ypres who had moved to Bruges around 1730. Through Beernaert he was inspired to paint genre scenes himself. He also became acquainted with Matthias de Visch, a painter of history paintings and portraits. De Visch had worked in Paris and Italy from which he returned to Bruges in 1732. He later became director of the art academy of Bruges. He introduced Garemijn to Italian painting and also taught him the elegant salon art of Antoine Watteau and François Boucher.

Aanbidding door de herders. Musea Brugge- Groeningemuseum. c. between circa 1712 and circa 1799

Garemijn designed and executed several of the plates for the Chronyke van Vlaenderen (Chronicles of Flanders) published in 1736 by Andreas Wydts. In the 1740s he worked on decorative paintings in various private residences. He prepared 14 small and large cartouches with inscriptions, coats of arms, ornaments and representations of "Hercules and the magnetic stone" on the occasion of the consecration of the 16th Bishop of Bruges in the St. Donatian's Cathedral on 14 July 1743. In 1749 he designed the processions and decorations for the celebration of the 6th centenary of the founding of the Chapel of the Holy Blood in Bruges. In 1753 he received from the minister plenipotentiary of the Austrian Netherlands Johann Karl Philipp von Cobenzl the commission to paint a large canvas depicting the Digging Out of the Ghent-Bruges Canal, an important public project of that time.

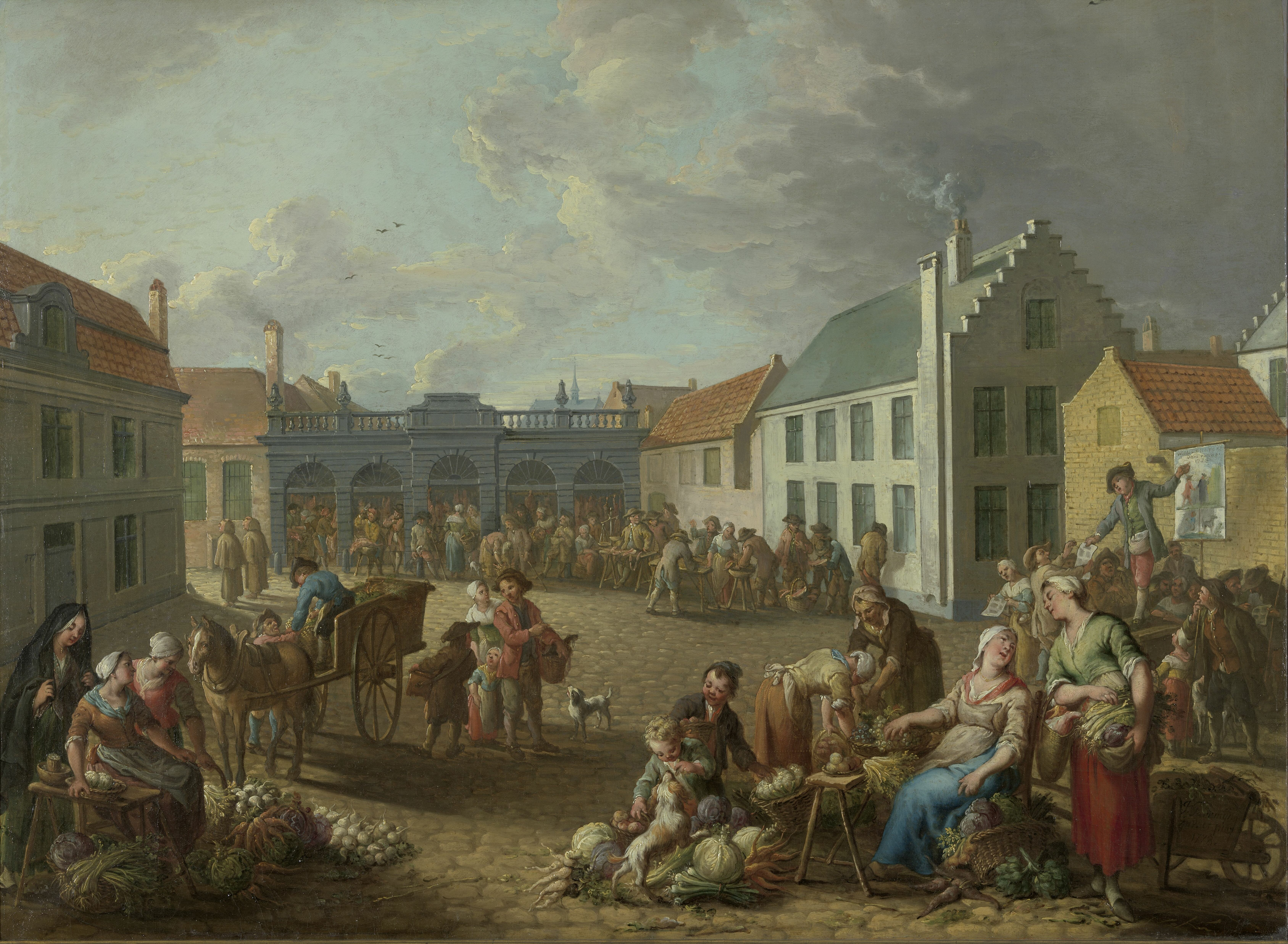
The Vegetable Market on the Pandreitje, 1778, the Groeningemuseum

He became director at the art academy of Bruges in 1765 after the death of Matthias de Visch in that year. After this appointment, he obtained many commissions from the clergy, the nobility and the middle class of Bruges. He also received commissions from other cities such as a commission for a Calling of Saint Rumboldus for the St. Rumbold's Cathedral in Mechelen. In 1768 he obtained in his capacity as director of the academy permission from the chapter of the St. Donatian's Cathedral to inscribe an epitath in memory of the famous Bruges painter Jan van Eyck in the Cathedral. In 1765 he retired as a director of the academy of Bruges. In 1778 he painted his famous The Vegetable Market on the Pandreitje (Groeningemuseum), which shows his talent in depicting in a lively manner large group scenes in a wide setting.

The numerous religious scenes he painted are in the conventional style he had learned from the Baroque masters. He was much more spontaneous in paintings depicting the picturesque aspects of everyday life. These paintings were often commissioned to be hung as decorative panels in salons and dining rooms.

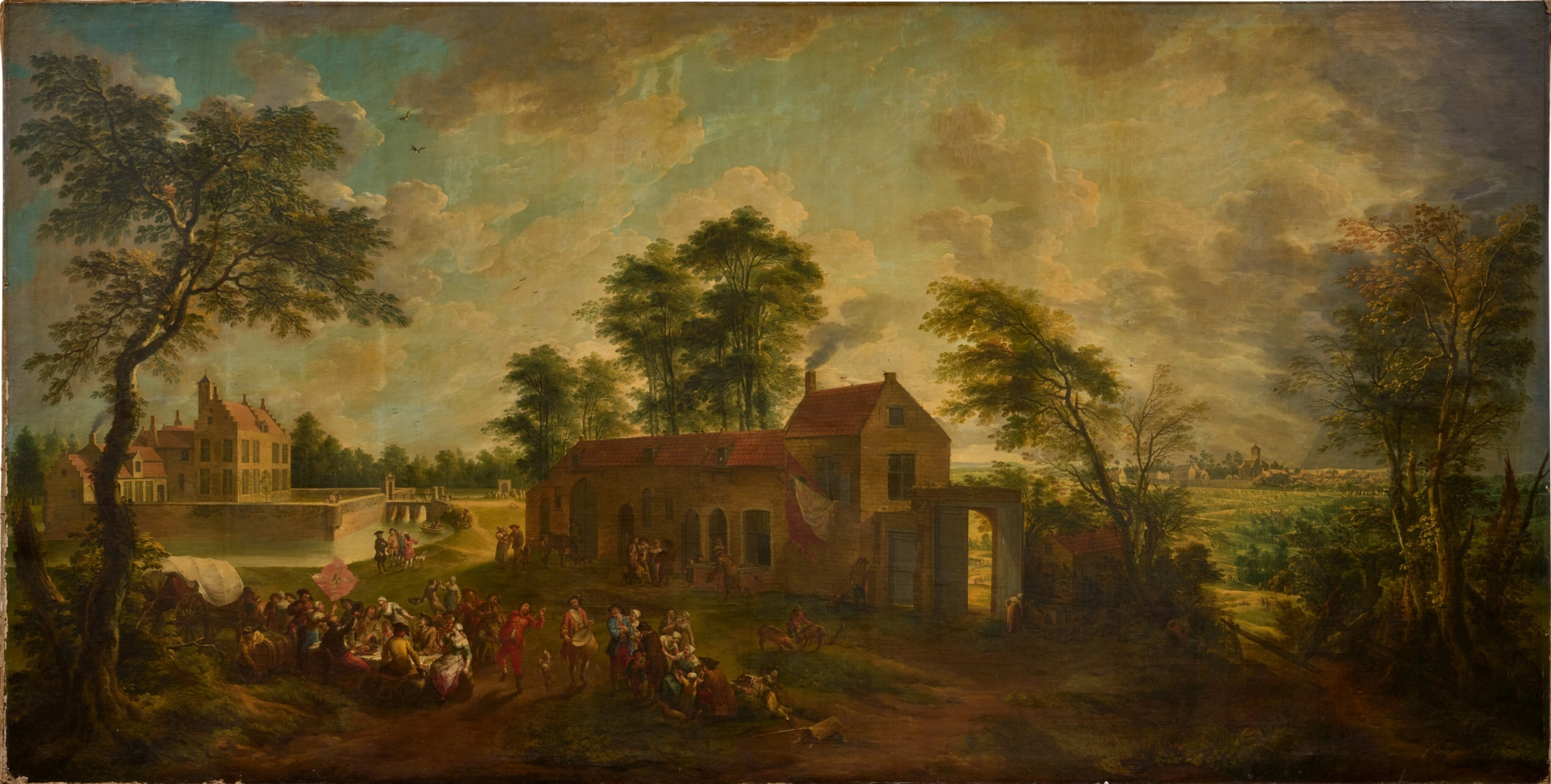
Peasants feasting in front of a castle with Dudzele village in the background, collaboration with Constantin van Eecke

As director of the academy, Garemijn also taught drawing from the male nude model. While supervising the drawing class, he himself drew numerous naked young men in various poses, drawings that are largely preserved in the collection of the Bruges museums. In 1775, a dispute arose with other teachers and Garemijn resigned.

Garemijn was a hardworking artist whose motto was 'Nulla dies sine linea' (Latin for: No day without a line). Free from family responsibilities, the bachelor was looked after by his mother and later by his sister. After the death of his mother and then his sister Anna in 1789, he decided to marry his 24-year-old maid Francisca Achtergael (Dudzele, 1767 - Bruges, 1847) and, after some resistance, agreed to have her two children registered in his name: Jan Jozef (born in 1796, only recognized by Garemijn in 1799) and Frans Jan (born in 1798). A third child, Marie-Anne (1799-1873) was born three months after his death. The probable father of these children was one of his former nude models, the resident tailor Jan Olivier Staffijn (1763-1826), who became the widow's second husband after Garemijn's death and had two more children with her: Joseph (born in 1804) and Louis (born in 1807). Garemijn left behind thousands of works, mainly drawings, by himself and other artists.
