= Joseph-Benoît Suvée =

Flemish painter (1743–1807)

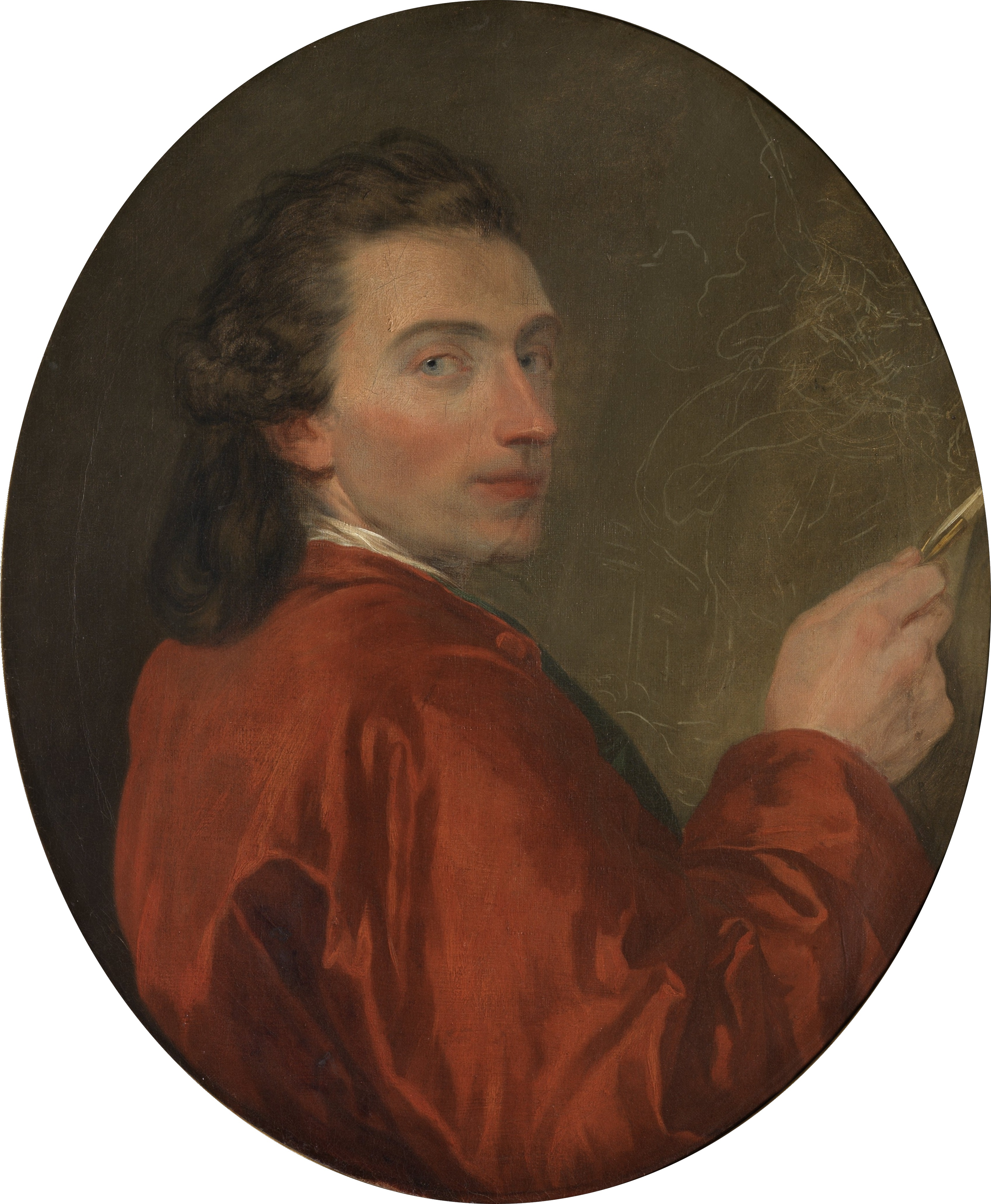
- Self-portrait (1771)
- Born: 3 January 1743; Bruges, Austrian Netherlands
- Died: 9 February 1807 (aged 64); Rome, Papal States
- Education: Pupil of Matthias de Visch and Jean-Jacques Bachelier
- Known for: Painting
- Notable work: Cornelia, Mother of the Gracchi (1795)
- Movement: Neo-classicism
- Awards: Prix de Rome (1771)

Signature
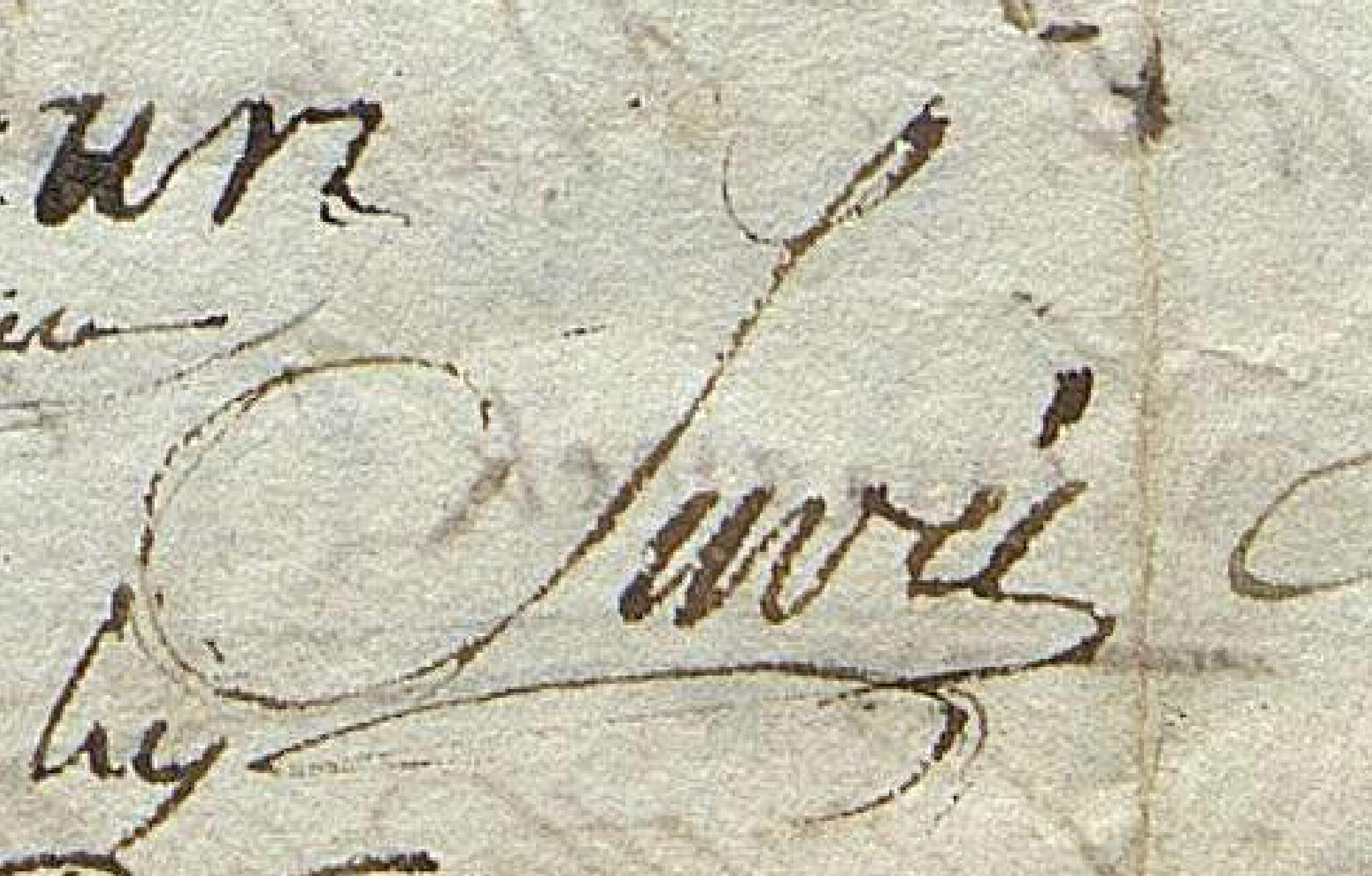

Joseph-Benoît Suvée (3 January 1743 – 9 February 1807) was a Flemish painter strongly influenced by French neo-classicism.

== Biography ==
Suvée was born in Bruges. Initially a pupil of Matthias de Visch, he came to France aged 19 and became a pupil of Jean-Jacques Bachelier. In 1771, he won the Prix de Rome. In Rome from 1772 to 1778, he prolonged the usual duration allowed to pensionaries of the French Academy in Rome. He was named an academician on his return to Paris and he opened an art school for young women at the Louvre. One of his students was Constance Mayer. He emulated and competed with Jacques-Louis David, earning his enduring hatred.

Named the French Academy in Rome's director in 1792, replacing François-Guillaume Ménageot, he was imprisoned for a while in the Prison Saint-Lazare and only able to take up the post in 1801. After a brilliant career, and a six years' stay in Rome as the Academy's Director, he died there suddenly.

His works include Achilles depositing the body of Hector at the feet of the body of Patroclus, (1769, Louvre), and Cornelia, mother of the Gracchi, (1795, Louvre).

His pupils were Jean-Baptiste Joseph Autrique (1777–1853), Augustin van den Berghe, Marie Bouliard, Cornelis Cels, Césarine Henriette Flore Davin, Joseph-François Ducq, Jean-Bernard Duvivier, Guillielmus Petrus Geysen (1761–1827), Albert Gregorius, Jean-François Legillon, Constance Mayer, Jozef Karel De Meulemeester (1774–1836), Joseph Denis Odevaere, Gertrude de Pélichy, Pierre Joseph Petit (1768–1825), Ange René Ravault (1766–1845), Jacques-Albert Senave, Charles Spruyt (1769–1851), Philip van der Wal (1774–?), and François Wynckelman. Anna Barbara Bansi, with whom he is said to have had an affair, was another pupil.

== Selected paintings ==
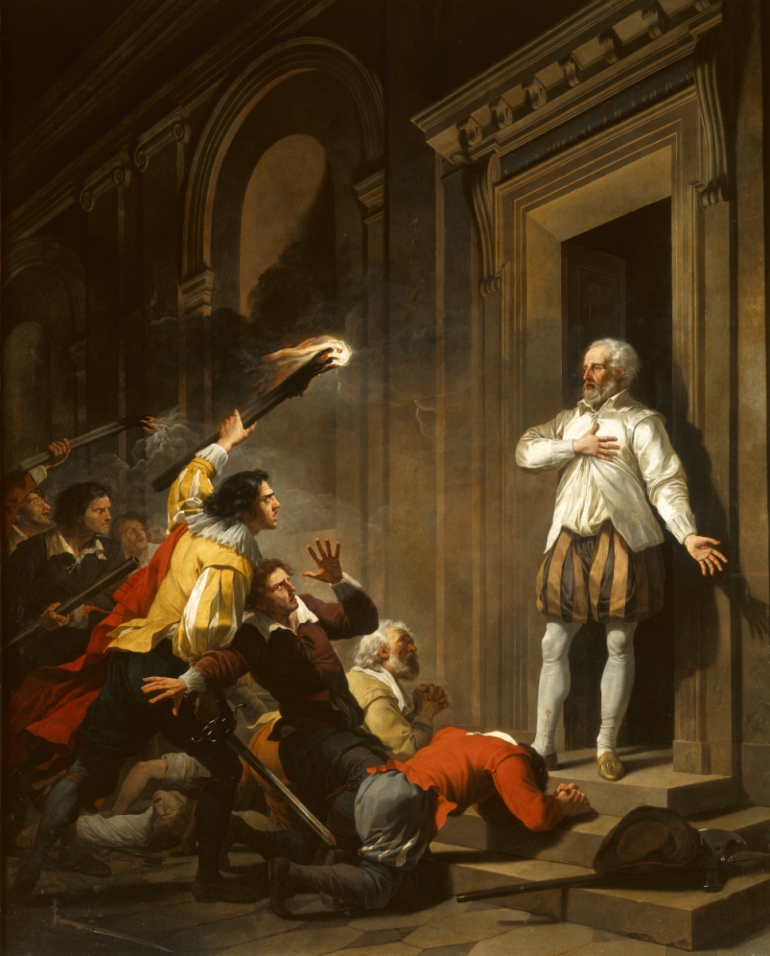
Admiral Coligny Confronts His Assassins, 1787

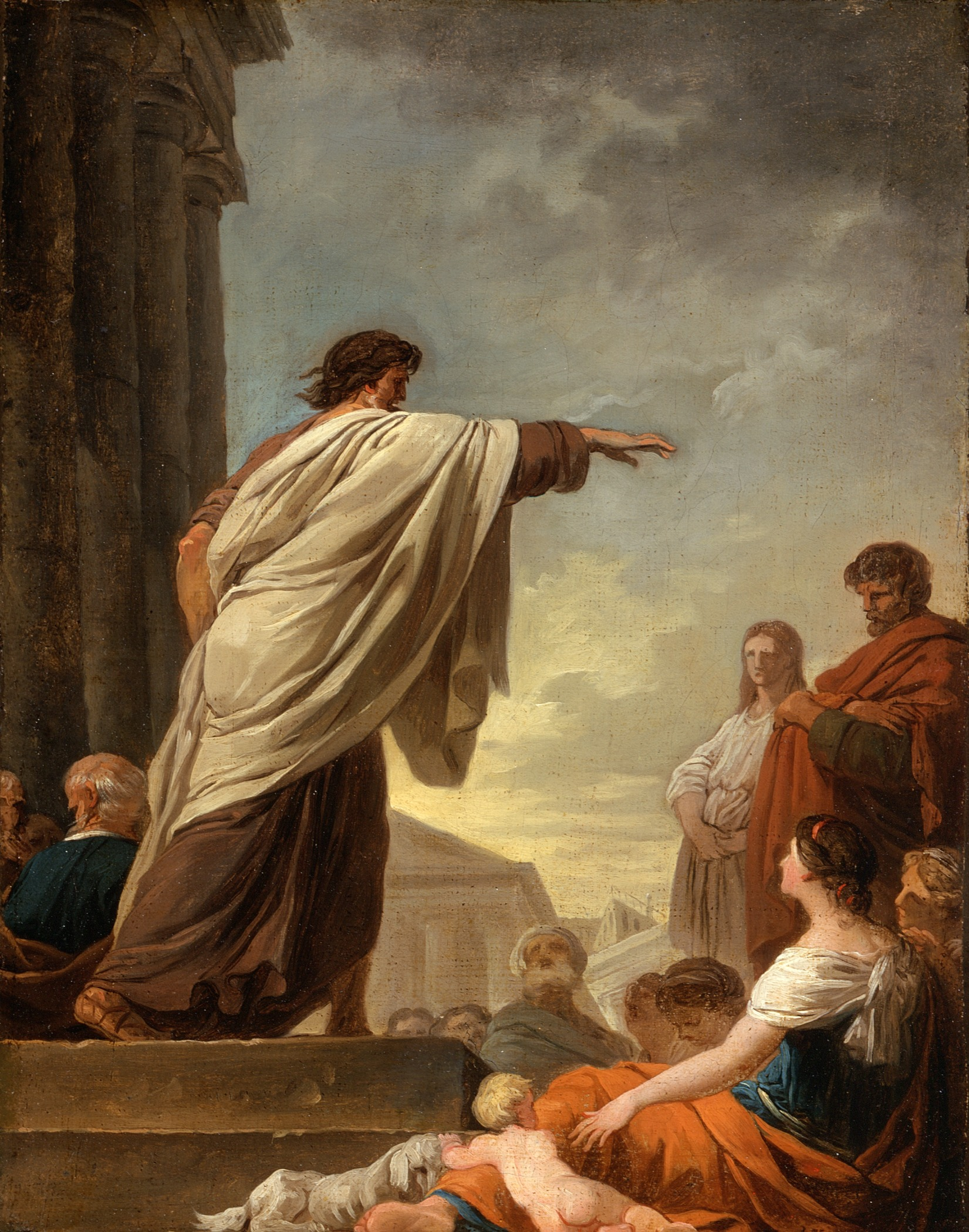
The Predication of
Saint Paul

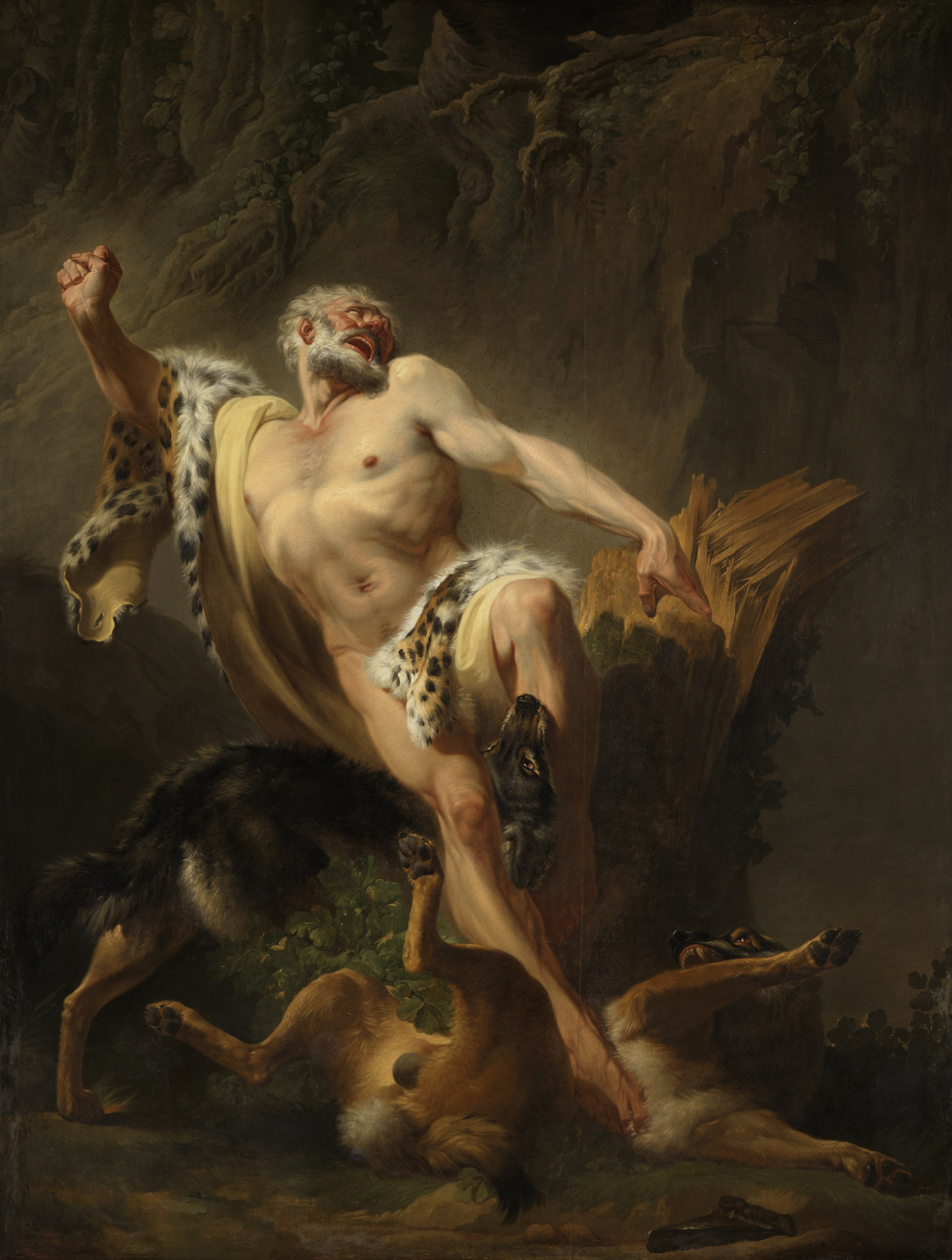
Milo of Croton

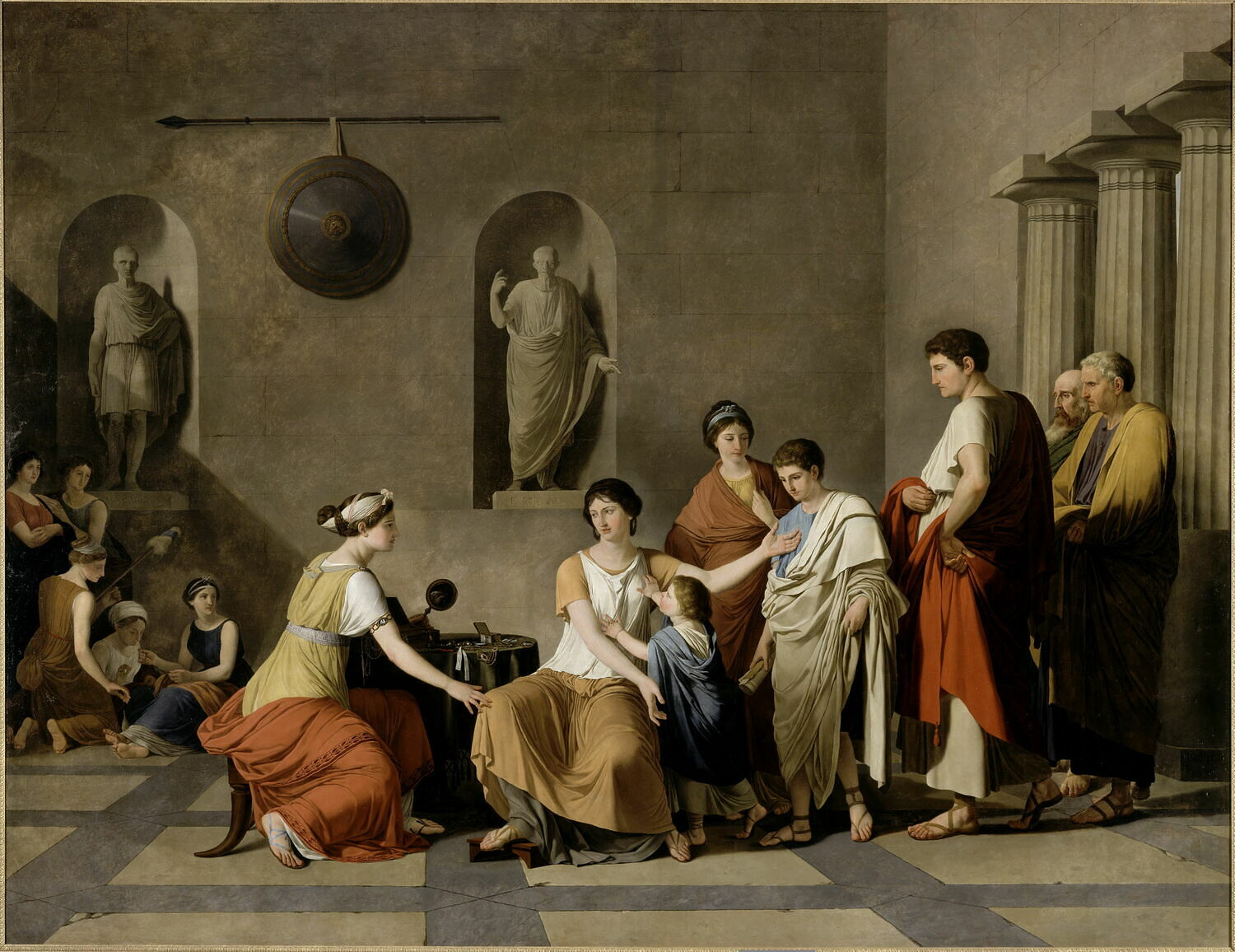
Cornelia, mother of the Gracchi

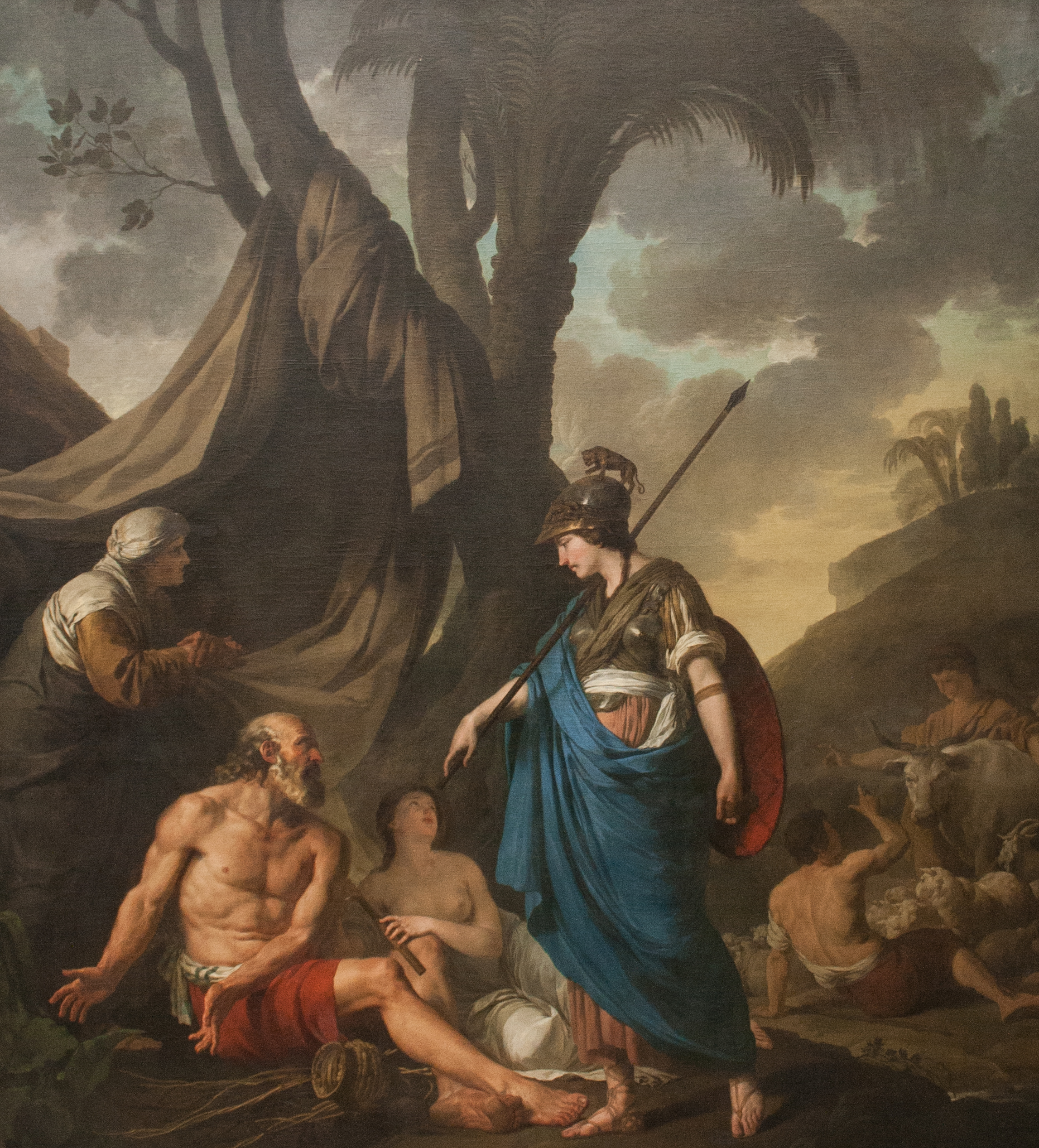
Erminia and the Shepherds
