= Matthias de Visch =

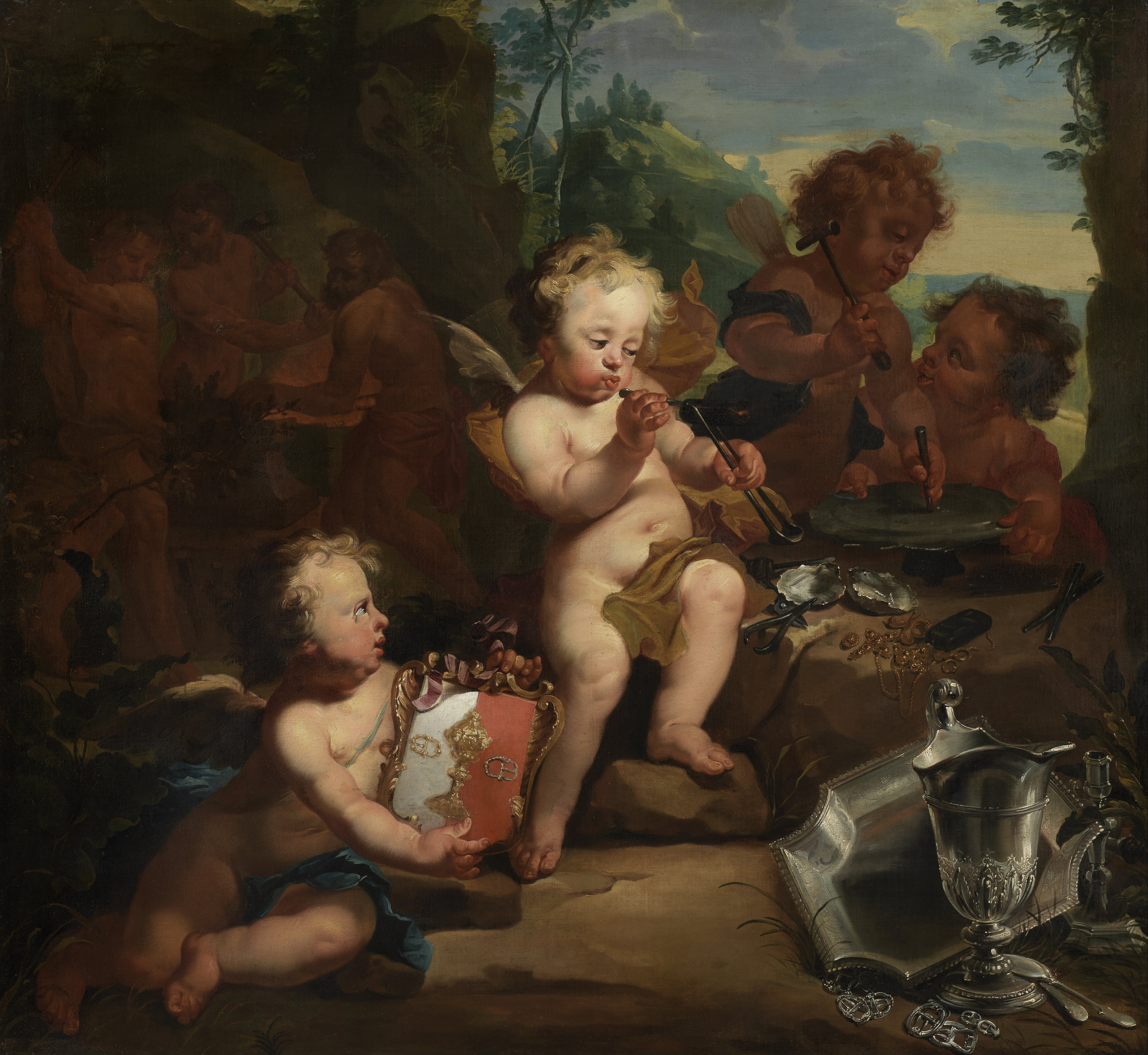
Allegory of goldsmithing

Matthias de Visch or Matthijs de Visch (22 March 1701 in Reninge – 23 April 1765 in Bruges) was a Flemish painter of history paintings and portraits.

== Life ==
He was a pupil of Joseph van den Kerckhove in Bruges. To continue his artistic training, he travelled to Paris and Italy, returning in 1732. He gave art lessons at his home from 1735 and played a key role in the reopening of the Bruges Academy of Art in 1739. He acted as its director from then until his death. The academy played a pioneering role in promoting neoclassicism in the Southern Netherlands. In 1737 he married Petronilla Iweins.

His pupils included Jean Garemyn, Paul de Cock, Pieter (I) Pepers, Jacques de Rijcke, and Joseph-Benoît Suvée.

== Work ==
De Visch painted diverse subjects, but is primarily known for his religious scenes and portraits. His style has a late-Baroque character, but can be regarded a transitional to the rococo in particular in his use of soft tones.
