= Gniewkowo (disambiguation) =

Gniewkowo may refer to:

== Locations ==
- Gniewkowo, town in Kuyavian–Pomeranian Voivodeship, Poland
  - Gmina Gniewkowo, municipality in Kuyavian–Pomeranian Voivodeship, Poland
- Gniewkowo, village in Greater Poland Voivodeship, Poland
- Gniewkowo, village in Masovian Voivodeship, Poland
- Gniewkowo, part of village of Sągnity in Bartoszyce County, Warmian–Masurian Voivodeship, Poland
- Gniewkowo, part of village of Gronowo, Mrągowo County, Warmian–Masurian Voivodeship, Poland

== States ==
- Duchy of Gniewkowo, 14th century duchy

== Events ==
- Battle of Gniewkowo, 1375 battle of Władysław the White's Rebellion
