= Półwiosek =

Settlement in Warmian-Masurian Voivodeship, Poland

- Location within Poland
- Coordinates: 54°18′56″N 20°25′53″E
- Country: Poland
- Voivodeship: Warmian-Masurian
- County: Bartoszyce
- Gmina: Górowo Iławeckie
- Time zone: UTC+1 (CET)
  - Summer (DST): UTC+2 (CEST)
- Vehicle registration: NBA

Półwiosek is a settlement in the administrative district of Gmina Górowo Iławeckie, in Bartoszyce County, Warmian-Masurian Voivodeship, in northern Poland.

From 1945 to 1958 Półwiosek was administratively located in the Iławka County in the Masurian District and Olsztyn Voivodeship.
