= Stega Wielka =

Former village in Warmian-Masurian Voivodeship, Poland

- Location within Poland
- Coordinates: 54°18′N 20°19′E
- Country: Poland
- Voivodeship: Warmian-Masurian
- County: Bartoszyce
- Gmina: Górowo Iławeckie
- Time zone: UTC+1 (CET)
  - Summer (DST): UTC+2 (CEST)
- Vehicle registration: NBA

Stega Wielka is an abandoned village in the administrative district of Gmina Górowo Iławeckie, within Bartoszyce County, Warmian-Masurian Voivodeship, in northern Poland.

From 1945 to 1958 Stega Wielka was administratively located in the Iławka County in the Masurian District and Olsztyn Voivodeship.
