= Dzikowo Iławeckie =

- Village
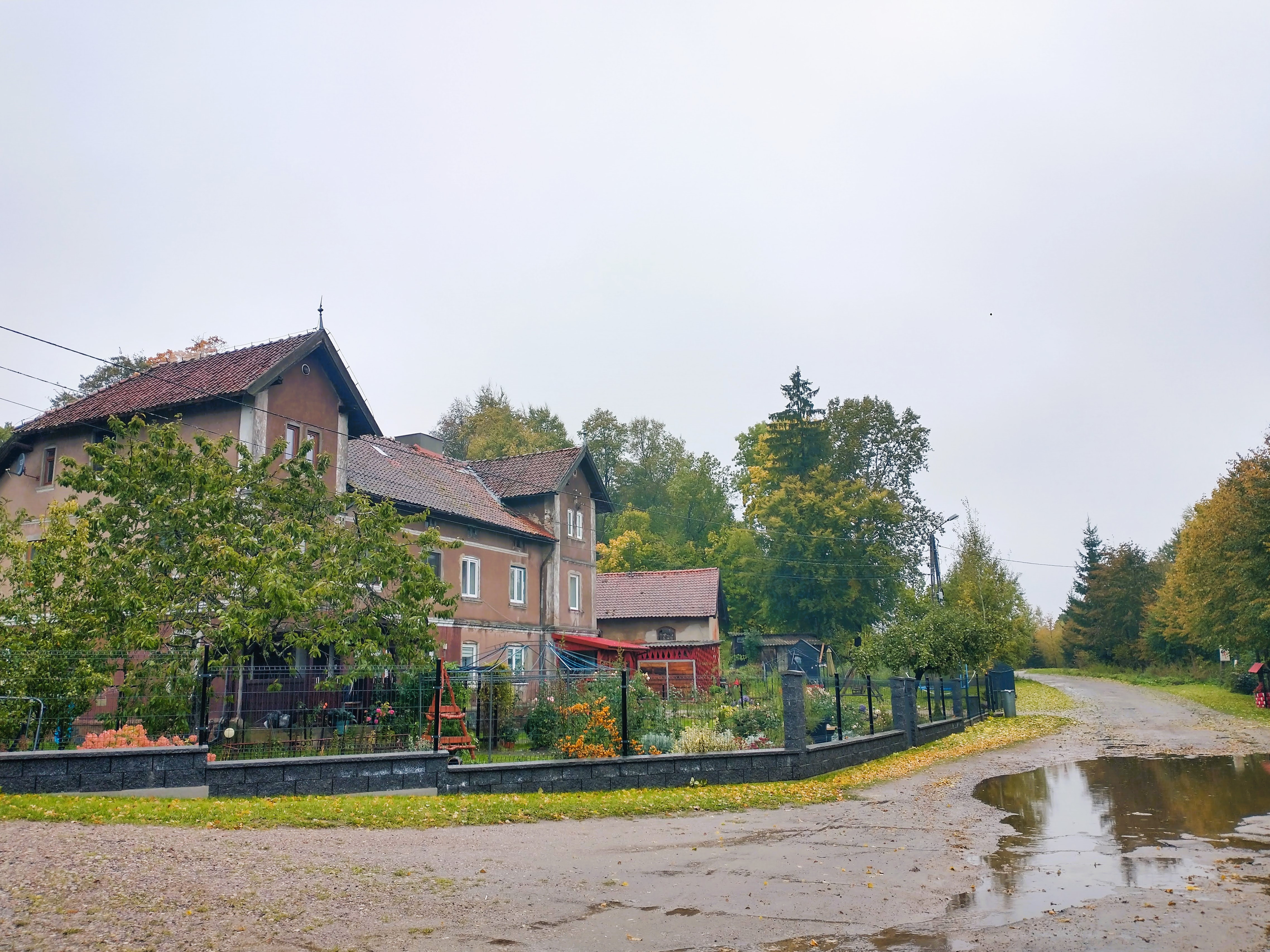

- Location within Poland
- Coordinates: 54°19′49″N 20°24′24″E
- Country: Poland
- Voivodeship: Warmian-Masurian
- County: Bartoszyce
- Gmina: Górowo Iławeckie

Population
  - Total: 290
- Time zone: UTC+1 (CET)
  - Summer (DST): UTC+2 (CEST)
- Vehicle registration: NBA

Dzikowo Iławeckie [d͡ʑiˈkɔvɔ iwaˈvɛt͡skʲɛ] (German: Wildenhoff) is a village in the administrative district of Gmina Górowo Iławeckie, within Bartoszyce County, Warmian-Masurian Voivodeship, in northern Poland, close to the border with the Kaliningrad Oblast of Russia.

== History ==
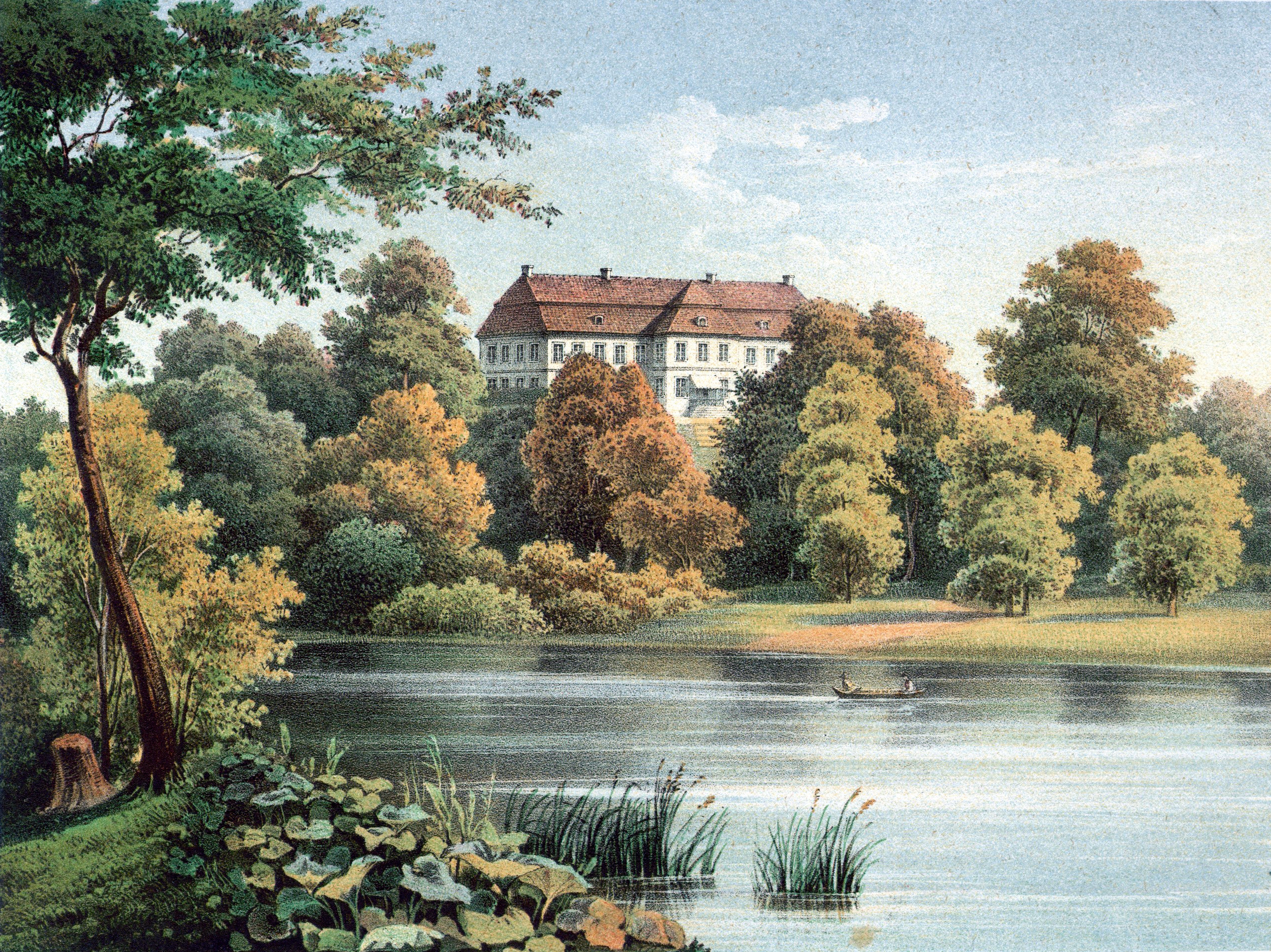
19th-century view of the local palace

In 1454, King Casimir IV Jagiellon incorporated the region into the Kingdom of Poland. After the subsequent Thirteen Years' War (1454–1466), it was a part of Poland as a fief held by the Teutonic Order. In 1491 the Teutonic Order awarded the Old Prussian settlement of Ampunden, sized 12 "Hufen", a square measure of the Teutonic Knights, to the nobleman Paul Pregel and after the abolition of the Monastic state of the Teutonic Knights Ampunden was awarded to the former Teutonic Knight Friedrich Truchseß von Waldburg by Duke Albert of Prussia in 1535. The name Ampunden was soon changed to Wildenhoff, which became the parent house of the Waldburg family. After the death of Gebhard Truchseß von Waldburg his wife married Otto von Schwerin in 1656, constituting the von Schwerin-Wildenhoff family, owner of the manor of Wildenhoff and advowson of the Church of Landsberg (Górowo Iławeckie) until 1945. In 1705 a large baroque palace was built by Friedrich Wilhelm Graf von Schwerin, which was completely destroyed in 1945.

In autumn 1944 several works of art from museums of Königsberg were evacuated to Wildenhoff, rumours also claimed the famous Amber Room might have been part of these pieces. In fact the head of the Königsberg museums administration, Dr. Alfred Rohde, visited Wildenhoff in October 1944 and organized several transports, excavations made in 1960 delivered some remains of different pieces of art, but no indications of the Amber Room theory.

After World War II the village again became part of Poland, under territorial changes demanded by the Soviet Union at the Potsdam Conference. Initially it was known as Dzikowo Warmińskie. From 1945 to 1958 the village was administratively located in the Iławka County, first in the Masurian District and, from 1946, in the Olsztyn Voivodeship. In 1947, it was renamed to Dzikowo Iławeckie.

== Population ==
Historical population
Year	Pop.	±%
1933	367	—
1939	334	−9.0%
2008	290	−13.2%
