= Kandyty =

- Village
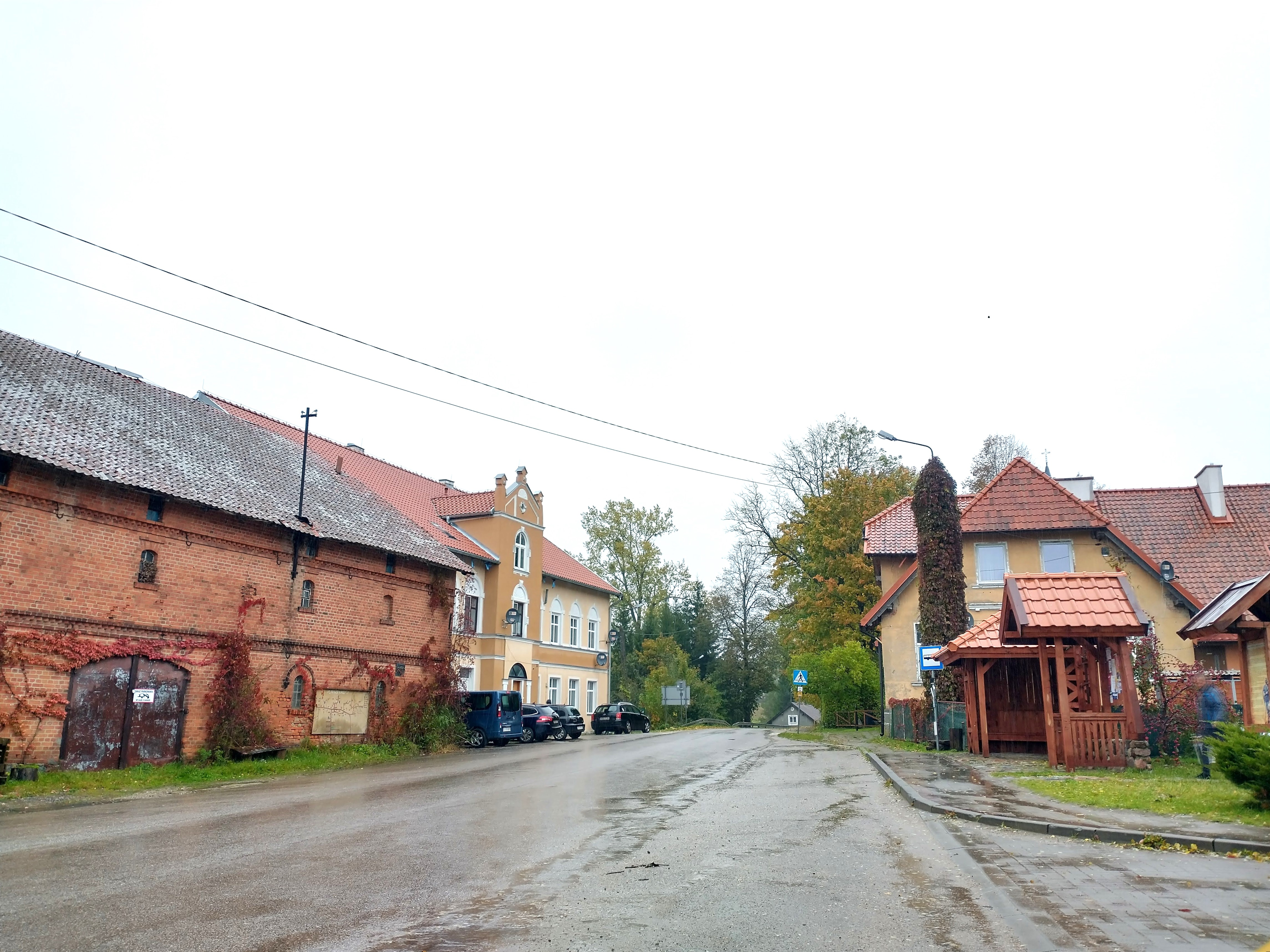

- Location within Poland
- Coordinates: 54°19′1″N 20°22′10″E
- Country: Poland
- Voivodeship: Warmian-Masurian
- County: Bartoszyce
- Gmina: Górowo Iławeckie

Population
  - Total: 980
- Time zone: UTC+1 (CET)
  - Summer (DST): UTC+2 (CEST)
- Vehicle registration: NBA

Kandyty [kanˈdɨtɨ] is a village in the administrative district of Gmina Górowo Iławeckie, within Bartoszyce County, Warmian-Masurian Voivodeship, in northern Poland, close to the border with the Kaliningrad Oblast of Russia.

== History ==
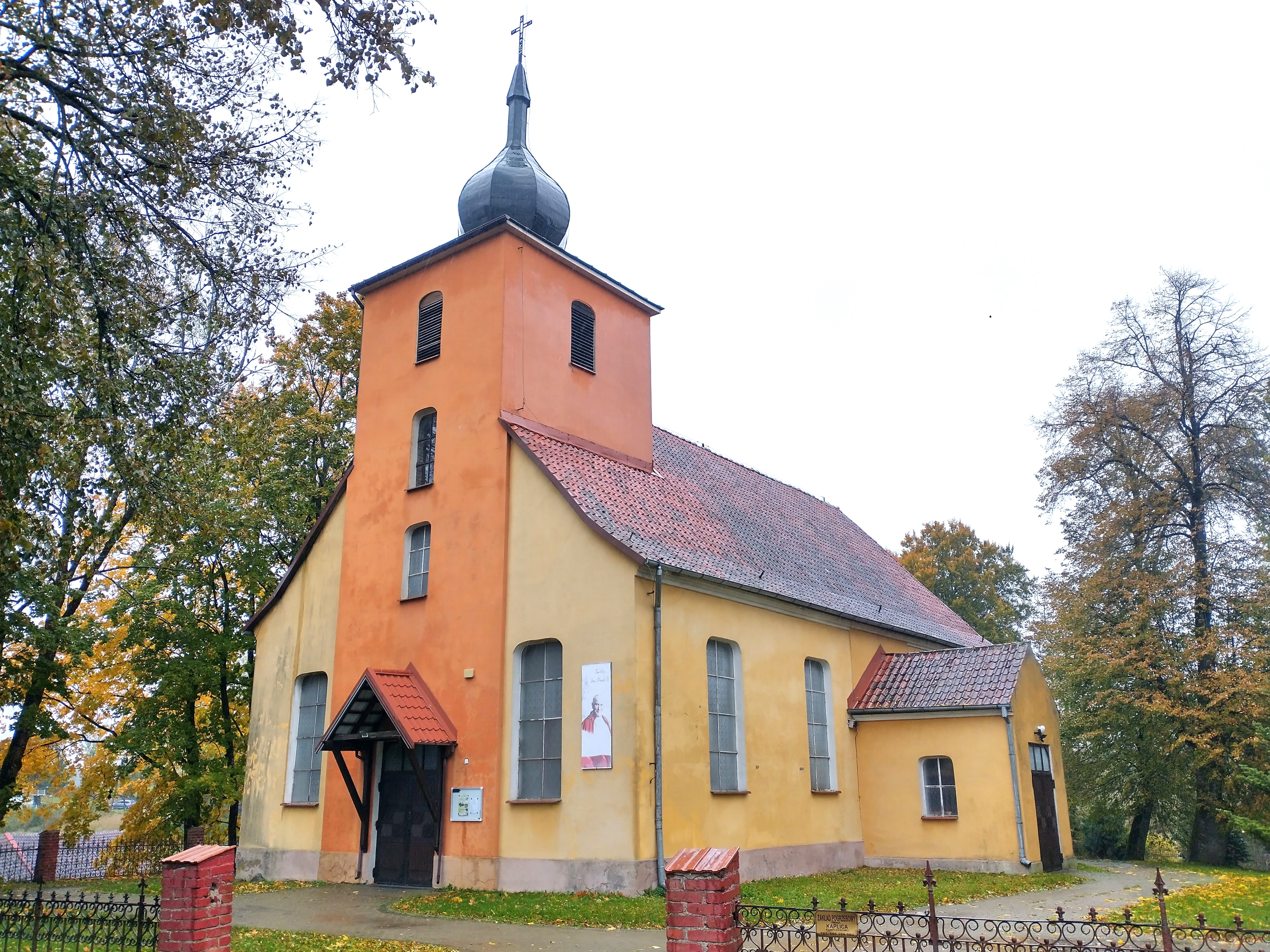
Church of the Nativity of the Virgin Mary in Kandyty

In 1285 the ownership of an area named "Catithen" in the Old Prussian area of Natangia was awarded to the Sudovian nobleman Skomand by the Teutonic Order. The name probably derives back to the Old Prussian term for a small ford. About 1350, throughout the German Settlement in the East, a village "Canditten", sized 80 "Hufen", a square measure of the Teutonic Knights, and a church was founded by the Order. Throughout the Polish-Teutonic Hunger War of 1414 the village and the church was destroyed by Polish troops, the priest and seven farmers were killed. An estimated damage of 3,500 Mark in the village and 1,000 Mark at the Church was calculated by the Teutonic Knights. In 1454, King Casimir IV Jagiellon incorporated the region into the Kingdom of Poland. The village suffered throughout the subsequent Polish-Teutonic Thirteen Years' War of 1454–1466. Per the peace treaty of 1466, it was a part of Poland as a fief held by the Teutonic Order. It was given as a pawn to the nobleman Paul Pregel in 1491. The church was completely destroyed in the horsemen's War of 1521, only four farmers lived here in 1540. In 1575 the landlord Truchseß von Waldburg re-established the Church. In 1664 the von Schwerin family of Wildenhoff became the landlords, which lasted until the abolition of serfdom in Prussia.

In 1820 2 manors, 21 farms, 4 cottages and 6 craftsmen existed.

From the 18th century, it was part of the Kingdom of Prussia, and from 1871 to 1945 it part of Germany, within which was administratively located in the province of East Prussia. The village was occupied by the Soviet Red Army on 18 February 1945 throughout the East Prussian Offensive. After World War II the area became again part of Poland under the terms of the Potsdam Agreement.

From 1959 to 1961 it was administratively located in the Górowo County in the Olsztyn Voivodeship.

== Population ==
Historical population

| Year | Pop. | ±% |
|---|---|---|
| 1820 | 256 | — |
| 1846 | 540 | +110.9% |
| 1871 | 765 | +41.7% |
| 1895 | 772 | +0.9% |

| Year | Pop. | ±% |
|---|---|---|
| 1933 | 803 | +4.0% |
| 1939 | 930 | +15.8% |
| 2008 | 980 | +5.4% |
