= Głamsławki =

Former village in Warmian-Masurian Voivodeship, Poland

- Location within Poland
- Coordinates: 54°20′49″N 20°43′38″E
- Country: Poland
- Voivodeship: Warmian-Masurian
- County: Bartoszyce
- Gmina: Bartoszyce
- Time zone: UTC+1 (CET)
  - Summer (DST): UTC+2 (CEST)
- Vehicle registration: NBA

Głamsławki is an abandoned village in the administrative district of Gmina Bartoszyce, in Bartoszyce County, Warmian-Masurian Voivodeship, in northern Poland.

From 1945 to 1958 Głamsławki was administratively located in the Iławka County in the Masurian District and Olsztyn Voivodeship.

== Archaeology ==
Archaeological excavations at Głamsławki have revealed evidence of the West Balt Barrow Culture in the form of burial mounds, with evidence suggesting the site was an important place for funerary rituals and cremations.
