= Bodzewo, Warmian-Masurian Voivodeship =

Former village in Warmian-Masurian Voivodeship, Poland

Bodzewo
- Location within Poland
- Coordinates: 54°22′N 20°43′E
- Country: Poland
- Voivodeship: Warmian-Masurian
- County: Bartoszyce
- Gmina: Bartoszyce
- Time zone: UTC+1 (CET)
  - Summer (DST): UTC+2 (CEST)
- Vehicle registration: NBA

Bodzewo is an abandoned village in the administrative district of Gmina Bartoszyce, in Bartoszyce County, Warmian-Masurian Voivodeship, in northern Poland.

From 1945 to 1958 Bodzewo was administratively located in the Iławka County in the Masurian District and Olsztyn Voivodeship.
