= Pieszkowo =

- Village
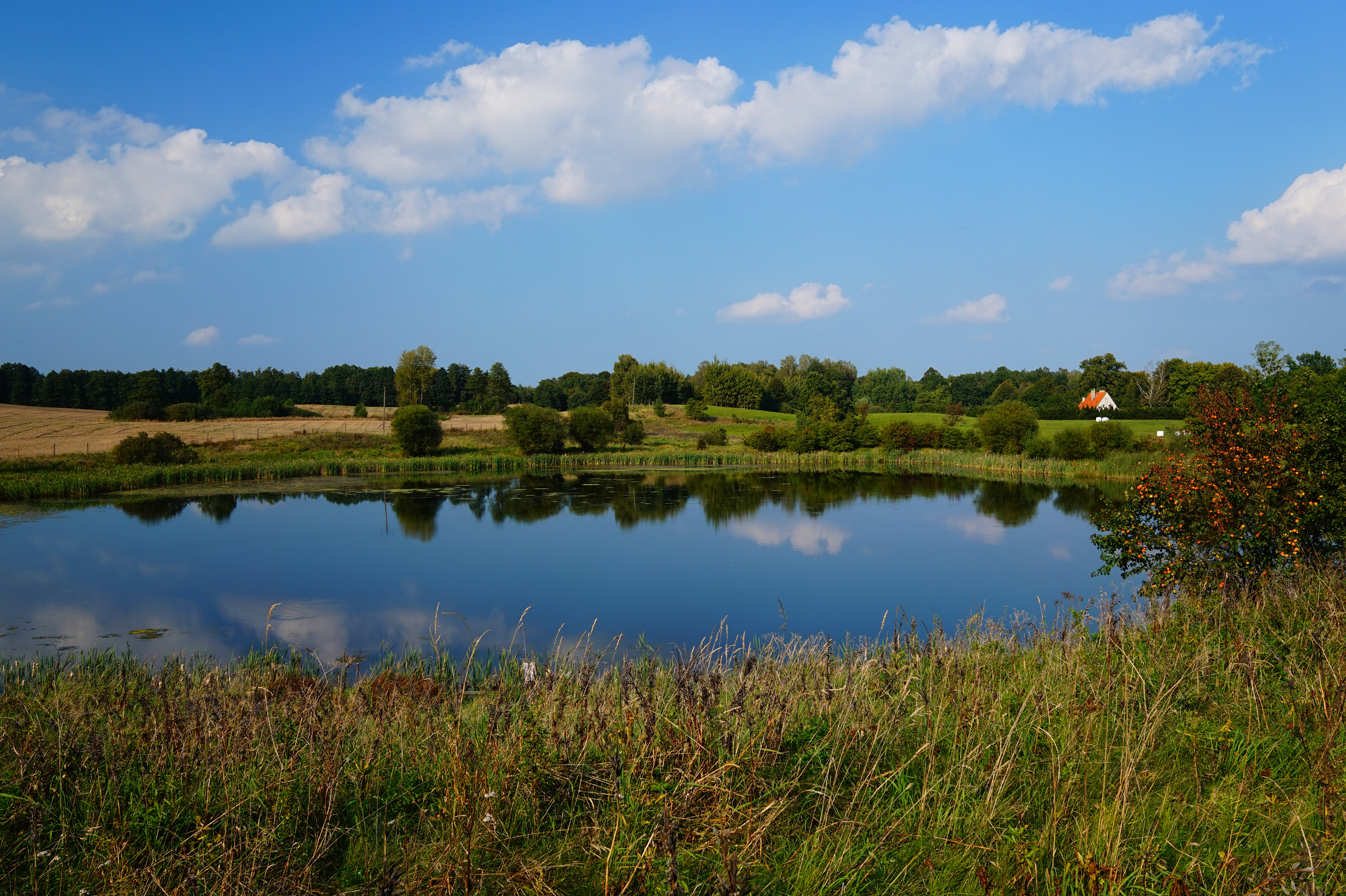

- Location within Poland
- Coordinates: 54°12′56″N 20°30′11″E
- Country: Poland
- Voivodeship: Warmian-Masurian
- County: Bartoszyce
- Gmina: Górowo Iławeckie
- Time zone: UTC+1 (CET)
  - Summer (DST): UTC+2 (CEST)
- Vehicle registration: NBA

Pieszkowo [pjɛʂˈkɔvɔ] is a village in the administrative district of Gmina Górowo Iławeckie, within Bartoszyce County, Warmian-Masurian Voivodeship, in northern Poland, close to the border with the Kaliningrad Oblast of Russia.

== History ==
Historically, Polish-language services were held in the local church.

From 1945 to 1958 the village was administratively located in the Iławka County in the Masurian District and Olsztyn Voivodeship. From 1959 to 1961 it was administratively located in the Górowo County in the Olsztyn Voivodeship.

== Notable people ==
- Klaas Reimer (1770–1837) the founder of the Kleine Gemeinde, a Mennonite denomination
