= Gałajny =

- Village
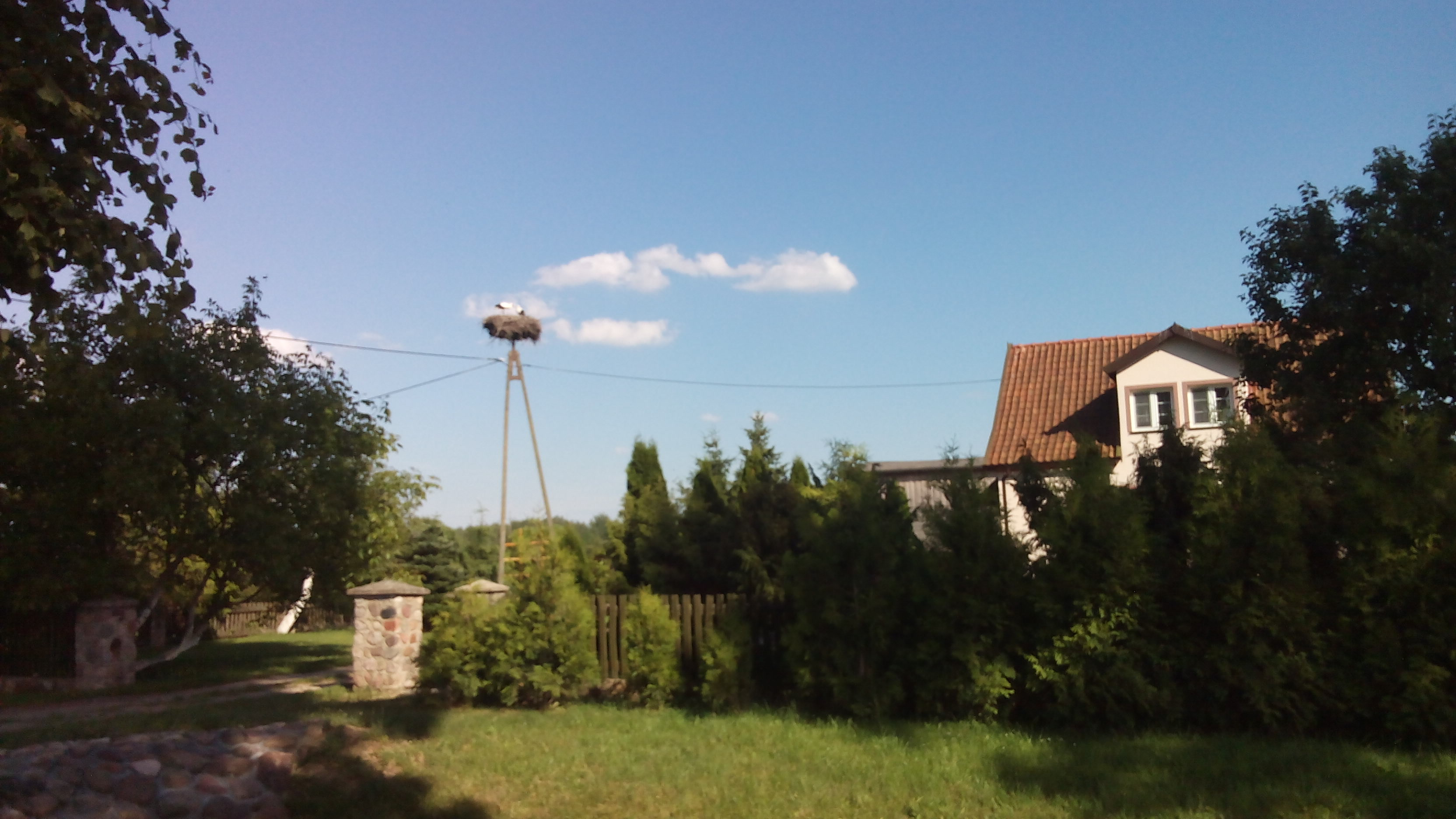

- Location within Poland
- Coordinates: 54°20′5″N 20°34′42″E
- Country: Poland
- Voivodeship: Warmian-Masurian
- County: Bartoszyce
- Gmina: Górowo Iławeckie

Population
  - Total: 176
- Time zone: UTC+1 (CET)
  - Summer (DST): UTC+2 (CEST)
- Vehicle registration: NBA

Gałajny [ɡaˈwai̯nɨ] is a village in the administrative district of Gmina Górowo Iławeckie, within Bartoszyce County, Warmian-Masurian Voivodeship, in northern Poland, close to the border with the Kaliningrad Oblast of Russia.

From 1945 to 1958 the village was administratively located in the Iławka County in the Masurian District and Olsztyn Voivodeship. From 1959 to 1961 it was administratively located in the Górowo County in the Olsztyn Voivodeship.
