= Bądze, Warmian-Masurian Voivodeship =

Bądze
- Village
- Location within Poland
- Coordinates: 54°13′57″N 20°33′21″E
- Country: Poland
- Voivodeship: Warmian-Masurian
- County: Bartoszyce
- Gmina: Górowo Iławeckie
- Time zone: UTC+1 (CET)
  - Summer (DST): UTC+2 (CEST)
- Vehicle registration: NBA

Bądze [ˈbɔnd͡zɛ] (German: Bensen) is a village in the administrative district of Gmina Górowo Iławeckie, within Bartoszyce County, Warmian-Masurian Voivodeship, in northern Poland, close to the border with the Kaliningrad Oblast of Russia.

From 1945 to 1958 the village was administratively located in the Iławka County in the Masurian District and Olsztyn Voivodeship.
