= Piasty Wielkie =

- Village
- Location within Poland
- Coordinates: 54°16′28″N 20°31′38″E
- Country: Poland
- Voivodeship: Warmian-Masurian
- County: Bartoszyce
- Gmina: Górowo Iławeckie
- Time zone: UTC+1 (CET)
  - Summer (DST): UTC+2 (CEST)
- Vehicle registration: NBA

Piasty Wielkie [ˈpjastɨ ˈvjɛlkʲɛ] is a village in the administrative district of Gmina Górowo Iławeckie, within Bartoszyce County, Warmian-Masurian Voivodeship, in northern Poland, close to the border with the Kaliningrad Oblast of Russia.

== History ==
The name derives back to the Old Prussian term "paustre" for wilderness and was first mentioned in 1414 as a location of a mill and a settlement of four free Old Prussians in the region of Natangia with 27 cultivated and 3 desolate "Haken", a square measure of the Teutonic Knights.

In 1454, King Casimir IV Jagiellon incorporated the region into the Kingdom of Poland. After the subsequent Thirteen Years' War (1454–1466), it was part of Poland as a fief held by the Teutonic Order.

In 1858 the manor was bought by Bethel Henry Strousberg, a railway pioneer who fell into bankruptcy in 1875.

From 1945 to 1958 the village was administratively located in the Iławka County in the Masurian District and Olsztyn Voivodeship.

== Population ==
Historical population
Year	Pop.	±%
1933	291	—
1939	247	−15.1%
