= Augamy =

- Village
- Location within Poland
- Coordinates: 54°22′27″N 20°22′1″E
- Country: Poland
- Voivodeship: Warmian-Masurian
- County: Bartoszyce
- Gmina: Górowo Iławeckie

Augamy [auˈɡamɨ] (German: Augam) is a village in the administrative district of Gmina Górowo Iławeckie, within Bartoszyce County, Warmian-Masurian Voivodeship, in northern Poland, close to the border with the Kaliningrad Oblast of Russia.

== History ==
The Old-Prussian village of Owgam was mentioned in the chronicles of the Teutonic Knights in 1414, when recording losses after the Polish-Teutonic war. During the Thirteen Years' War the village was completely depopulated and only resettled a century later.

In 1686, a woman called Englersche of Augam was imprisoned and accused of witchcraft. Her trial took place in Górowo Iławeckie, during which the alleged witch confessed to negotiating with the devil. Taking into account the convict's conversion and repentance, the sentence was changed from being burnt alive to a beheading and then burning the body. The village of Augam may be related to a settlement mentioned in Teutonic documents from 1339 called Laumygabis (Mount Laum).

== Population ==
- 1933: 292
- 1939: 282
