= Czyprki =

Czyprki may refer to the following places:

- Czyprki, Bartoszyce County in Warmian-Masurian Voivodeship (north Poland)
- Czyprki, Ełk County in Warmian-Masurian Voivodeship (north Poland)
- Czyprki, Giżycko County in Warmian-Masurian Voivodeship (north Poland)
