= Malinowo =

Malinowo may refer to the following places:

- Malinowo, Bielsk County in Podlaskie Voivodeship (north-east Poland)
- Malinowo, Siemiatycze County in Podlaskie Voivodeship (north-east Poland)
- Malinowo, Wysokie Mazowieckie County in Podlaskie Voivodeship (north-east Poland)
- Malinowo, Pomeranian Voivodeship (north Poland)
- Malinowo, Bartoszyce County in Warmian-Masurian Voivodeship (north Poland)
- Malinowo, Działdowo County in Warmian-Masurian Voivodeship (north Poland)
- Malinowo, Olsztyn County in Warmian-Masurian Voivodeship (north Poland)
