= Lipniki =

Lipniki may refer to:

- Lipniki, Kuyavian-Pomeranian Voivodeship (north-central Poland)
- Lipniki, Lublin Voivodeship (east Poland)
- Lipniki, Podlaskie Voivodeship (north-east Poland)
- Lipniki, Garwolin County in Masovian Voivodeship (east-central Poland)
- Lipniki, Maków County in Masovian Voivodeship (east-central Poland)
- Lipniki, Ostrołęka County in Masovian Voivodeship (north-east Poland)
- Lipniki, Sierpc County in Masovian Voivodeship (north-central Poland)
- Lipniki, Węgrów County in Masovian Voivodeship (east-central Poland)
- Lipniki, Opole Voivodeship (south-west Poland)
- Lipniki, Bartoszyce County in Warmian-Masurian Voivodeship (north Poland)
- Lipniki, Szczytno County in Warmian-Masurian Voivodeship (north Poland)
- Lipniki, Wołyń Voivodeship, Volhynia

== See also ==
- Jonathan Lipnicki
