= Żywkowo, Warmian-Masurian Voivodeship =

Żywkowo
- Village
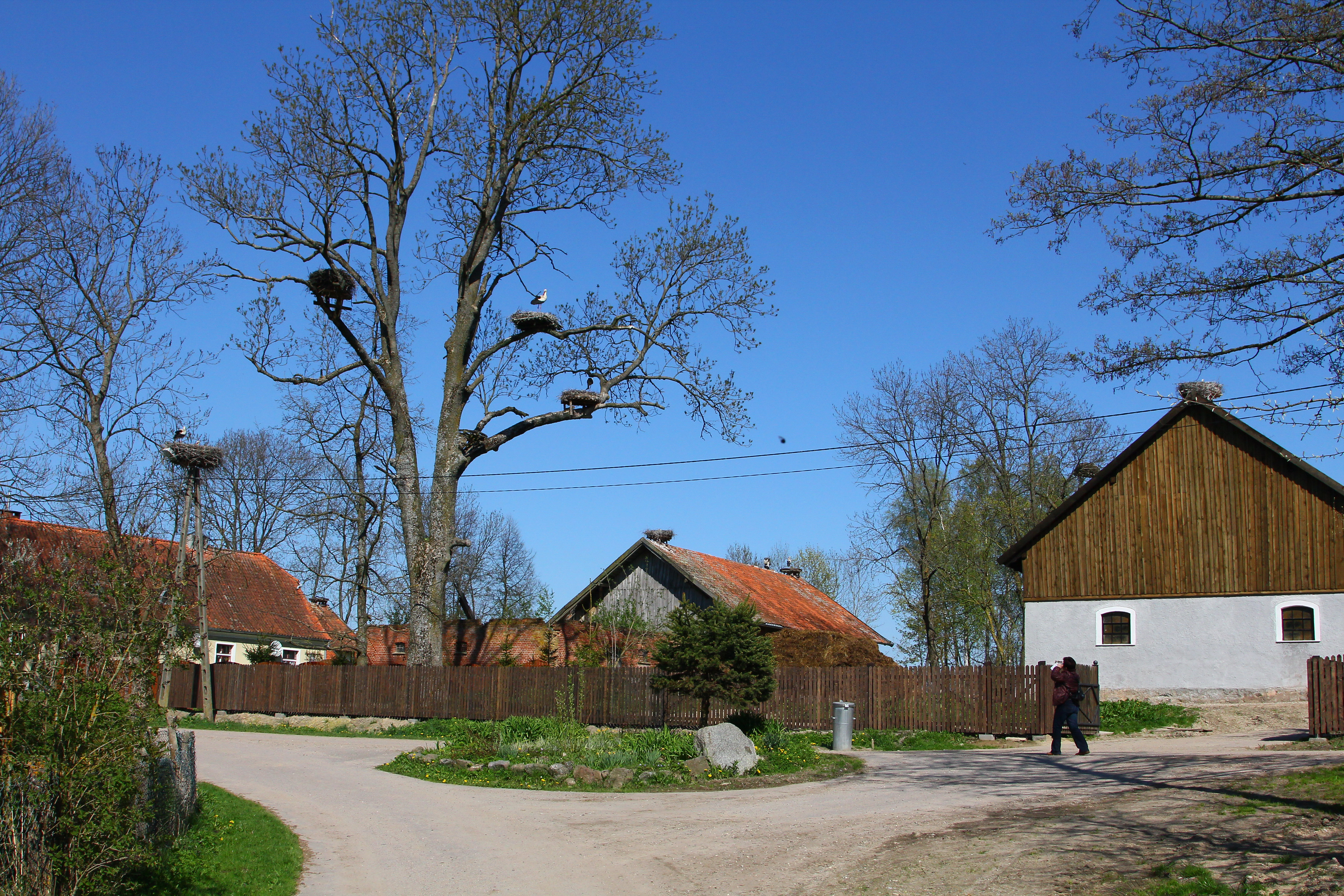
- Stork's nests in Żywkowo
- Interactive map of Żywkowo
- Location within Poland
- Coordinates: 54°22′15.02″N 20°35′33.14″E
- Country: Poland
- Voivodeship: Warmian-Masurian
- County: Bartoszyce
- Gmina: Górowo Iławeckie
- Population: 30
- Time zone: UTC+1 (CET)
  - Summer (DST): UTC+2 (CEST)
- Postal code: 11-220
- Vehicle registration: NBA

Żywkowo [ʐɨfˈkɔvɔ] (German: Schewecken) is a village in the administrative district of Gmina Górowo Iławeckie, within Bartoszyce County, Warmian-Masurian Voivodeship, in northern Poland, close to the border with the Kaliningrad Oblast of Russia.

It is one of the most popular Polish so called "Storks villages". For 30 inhabitants accrue about 160 storks and 42 nests.
