= Żołędnik =

- Village
- Location within Poland
- Coordinates: 54°14′30″N 20°26′45″E
- Country: Poland
- Voivodeship: Warmian-Masurian
- County: Bartoszyce
- Gmina: Górowo Iławeckie

Żołędnik [ʐɔˈwɛndnik] (German: Sienken)( is a village in the administrative district of Gmina Górowo Iławeckie, within Bartoszyce County, Warmian-Masurian Voivodeship, in northern Poland, close to the border with the Kaliningrad Oblast of Russia.
