= Stega Mała =

- Village
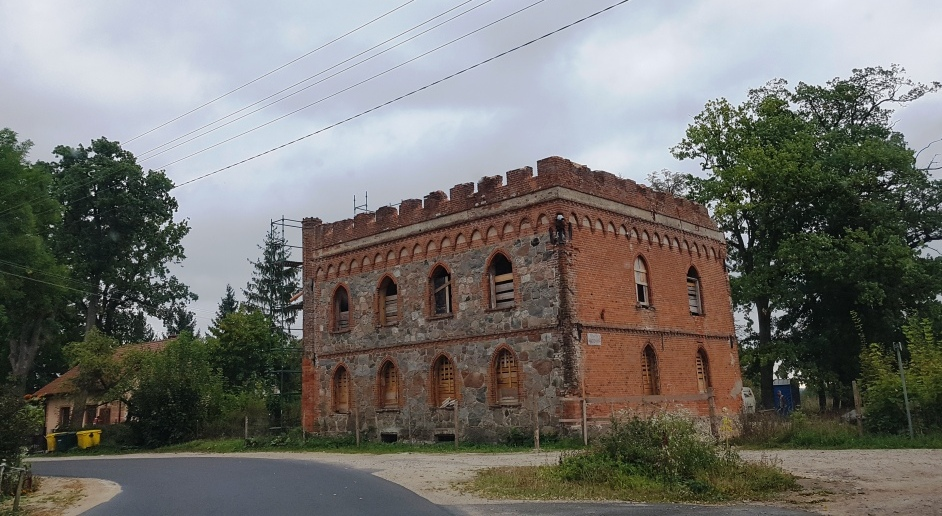

- Location within Poland
- Coordinates: 54°18′39″N 20°18′40″E
- Country: Poland
- Voivodeship: Warmian-Masurian
- County: Bartoszyce
- Gmina: Górowo Iławeckie

Stega Mała [ˈstɛɡa ˈmawa] (German: Klein Steegen) is a village in the administrative district of Gmina Górowo Iławeckie, within Bartoszyce County, Warmian-Masurian Voivodeship, in northern Poland, close to the border with the Kaliningrad Oblast of Russia.
