= Worławki, Bartoszyce County =

Worławki
- Village
- Location within Poland
- Coordinates: 54°16′37″N 20°25′58″E
- Country: Poland
- Voivodeship: Warmian-Masurian
- County: Bartoszyce
- Gmina: Górowo Iławeckie

Worławki [vɔrˈwafki] (German: Worlack) is a village in the administrative district of Gmina Górowo Iławeckie, within Bartoszyce County, Warmian-Masurian Voivodeship, in northern Poland, close to the border with the Kaliningrad Oblast of Russia.
