= Wojmiany =

- Village
- Location within Poland
- Coordinates: 54°18′43″N 20°32′14″E
- Country: Poland
- Voivodeship: Warmian-Masurian
- County: Bartoszyce
- Gmina: Górowo Iławeckie

Wojmiany [vɔi̯ˈmjanɨ] (German: Woymanns) is a village in the administrative district of Gmina Górowo Iławeckie, within Bartoszyce County, Warmian-Masurian Voivodeship, in northern Poland, close to the border with the Kaliningrad Oblast of Russia.
