= Nerwiki =

- Village
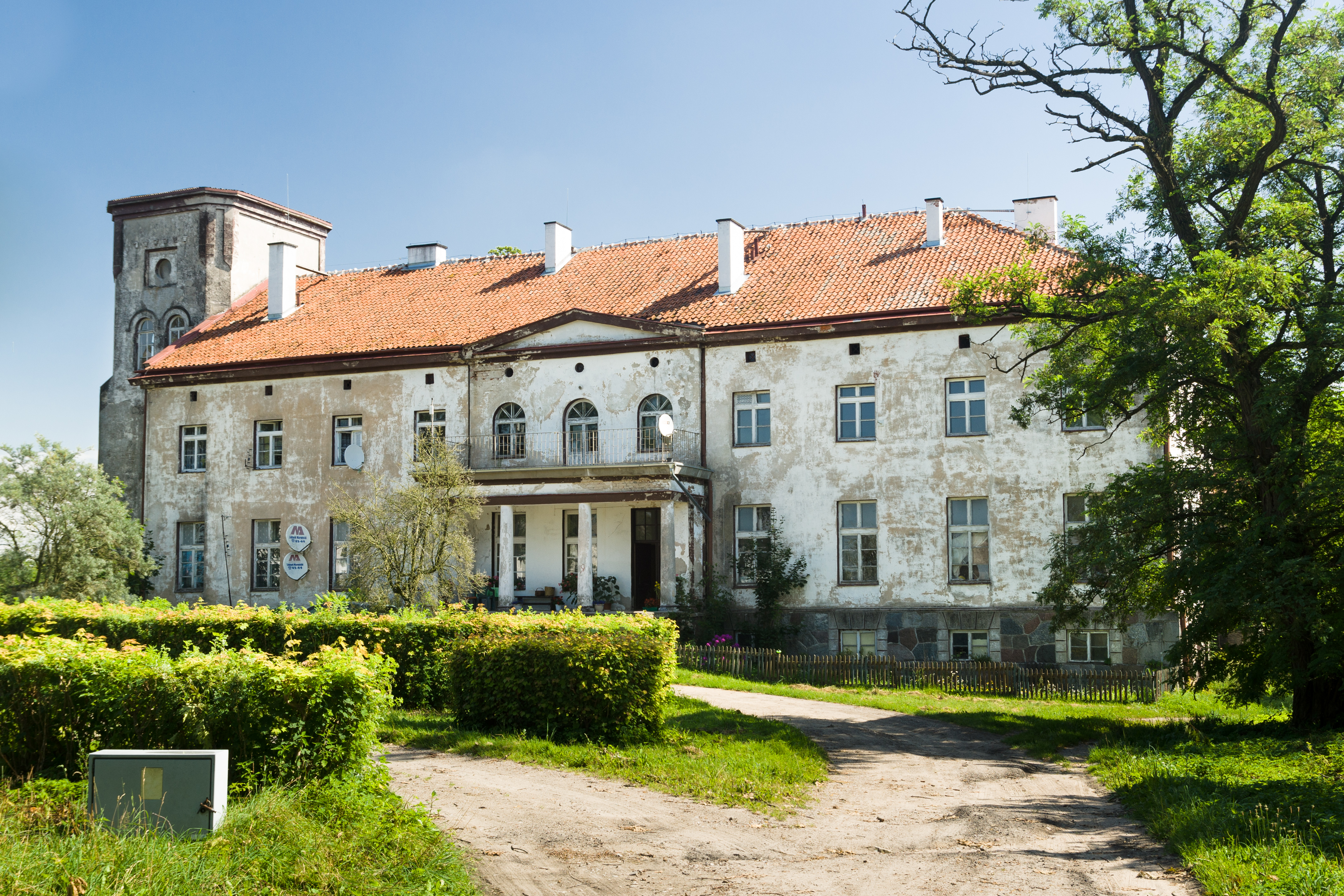
- A palace in Nerwiki.

- Location within Poland
- Coordinates: 54°11′N 20°31′E
- Country: Poland
- Voivodeship: Warmian-Masurian
- County: Bartoszyce
- Gmina: Górowo Iławeckie

Nerwiki [nɛrˈviki] is a village in the administrative district of Gmina Górowo Iławeckie, within Bartoszyce County, Warmian-Masurian Voivodeship, in northern Poland, close to the border with the Kaliningrad Oblast of Russia.
