= Kanie Iławeckie =

- Village
- Location within Poland
- Coordinates: 54°13′17″N 20°31′58″E
- Country: Poland
- Voivodeship: Warmian-Masurian
- County: Bartoszyce
- Gmina: Górowo Iławeckie
- Population: 70

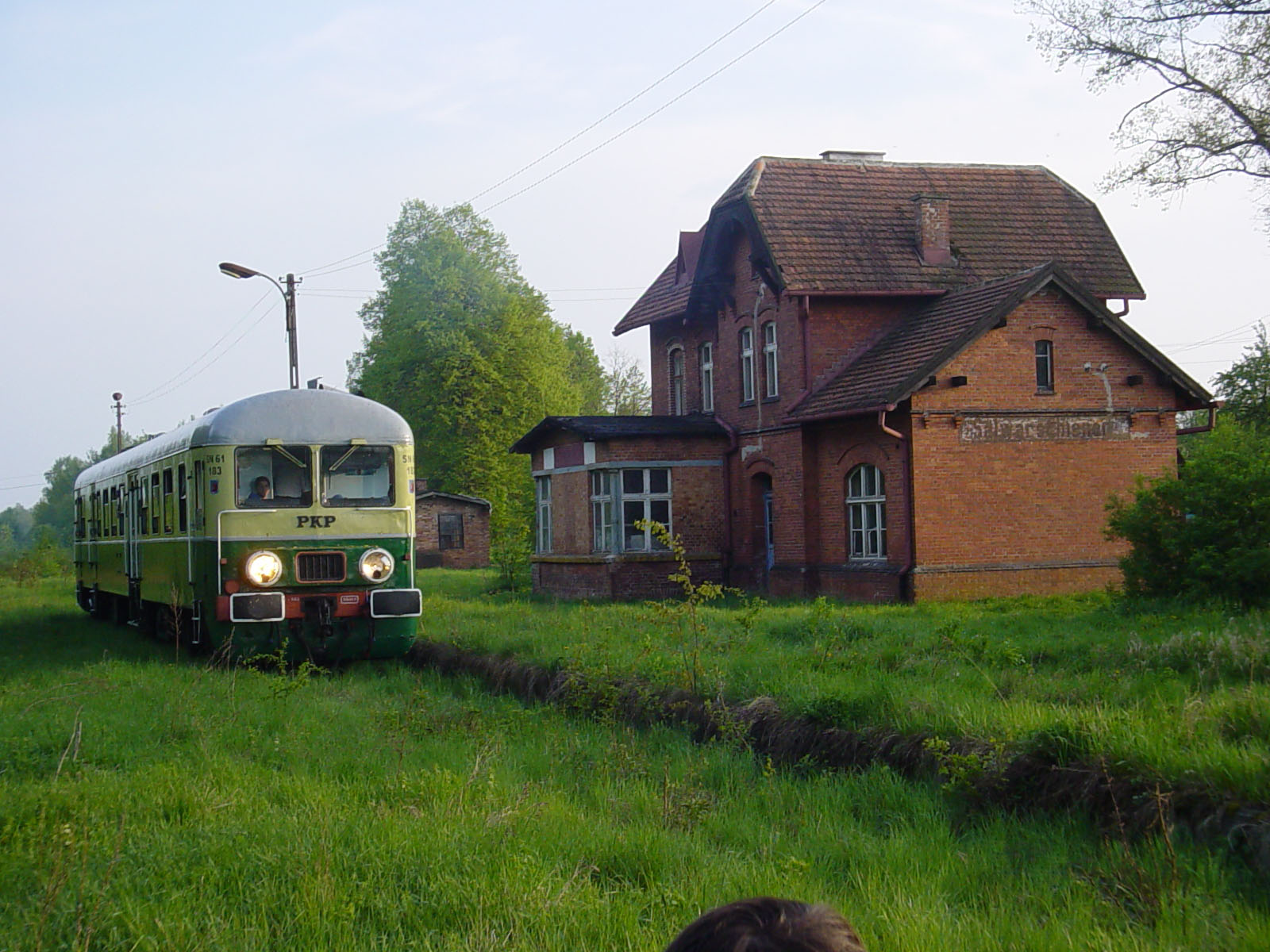
The station

Kanie Iławeckie [ˈkaɲɛ iwaˈvɛt͡skʲɛ] (German: Salwarschienen) is a village in the administrative district of Gmina Górowo Iławeckie, within Bartoszyce County, Warmian-Masurian Voivodeship, in northern Poland, close to the border with the Kaliningrad Oblast of Russia.
