= Krasnołąka, Bartoszyce County =

Krasnołąka
- Village
- Location within Poland
- Coordinates: 54°19′N 20°31′E
- Country: Poland
- Voivodeship: Warmian-Masurian
- County: Bartoszyce
- Gmina: Górowo Iławeckie
- Population: 320

Krasnołąka [krasnɔˈwɔnka] is a village in the administrative district of Gmina Górowo Iławeckie, within Bartoszyce County, Warmian-Masurian Voivodeship, in northern Poland, close to the border with the Kaliningrad Oblast of Russia.
