= Skarbiec, Warmian-Masurian Voivodeship =

Skarbiec
- Village
- Location within Poland
- Coordinates: 54°18′N 20°18′E
- Country: Poland
- Voivodeship: Warmian-Masurian
- County: Bartoszyce
- Gmina: Górowo Iławeckie

Skarbiec [ˈskarbjɛt͡s] is a village in the administrative district of Gmina Górowo Iławeckie within Bartoszyce County, Warmian-Masurian Voivodeship, in northern Poland. It is close to the border with the Kaliningrad Oblast of Russia.
