= Grądzik, Warmian-Masurian Voivodeship =

Grądzik
- Village
- Location within Poland
- Coordinates: 54°22′4″N 20°36′1″E
- Country: Poland
- Voivodeship: Warmian-Masurian
- County: Bartoszyce
- Gmina: Górowo Iławeckie

Grądzik [ˈɡrɔnd͡ʑik] is a village in the administrative district of Gmina Górowo Iławeckie, within Bartoszyce County, Warmian-Masurian Voivodeship, in northern Poland, close to the border with the Kaliningrad Oblast of Russia.
