= Dęby, Warmian-Masurian Voivodeship =

Dęby
- Village
- Location within Poland
- Coordinates: 54°19′42″N 20°28′52″E
- Country: Poland
- Voivodeship: Warmian-Masurian
- County: Bartoszyce
- Gmina: Górowo Iławeckie
- Population: 350

Dęby ([ˈdɛmbɨ] German: Eichen) is a village in the administrative district of Gmina Górowo Iławeckie, within Bartoszyce County, Warmian-Masurian Voivodeship, in northern Poland, close to the border with the Kaliningrad Oblast of Russia.

== Population ==
- 1933: 290
- 1939: 323
- 2008: 350
