= Zielenica, Warmian-Masurian Voivodeship =

Zielenica
- Village
- Location within Poland
- Coordinates: 54°14′N 20°31′E
- Country: Poland
- Voivodeship: Warmian-Masurian
- County: Bartoszyce
- Gmina: Górowo Iławeckie
- Population: 460

Zielenica [ʑɛlɛˈnit͡sa] (German: Grünwalde)is a village in the administrative district of Gmina Górowo Iławeckie, within Bartoszyce County, Warmian-Masurian Voivodeship, in northern Poland, close to the border with the Kaliningrad Oblast of Russia. Above the village, towards the west, lays the highest hill in the area

A vast necropolis was located near Zielenica in the form of individual kurgans separated by several hundred meters. The first mounds, surrounded by a stone circle, were discovered in the late nineteenth century with richly decorated dishes and elements of bronze ornaments in them.

== Population ==
- 1933: 429
- 1939: 406
