= Janikowo, Warmian-Masurian Voivodeship =

Janikowo
- Village
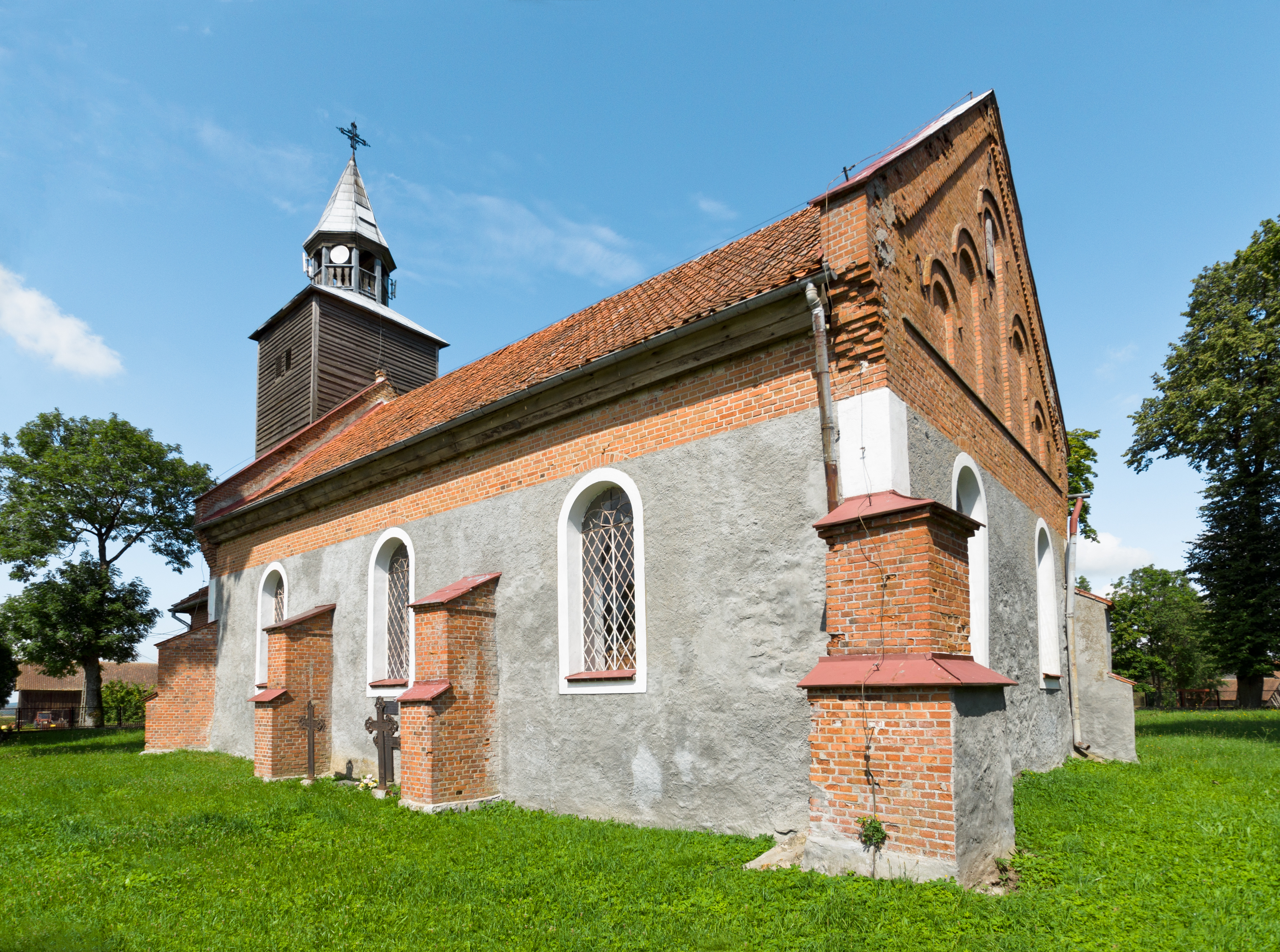
- Our Lady of the Rosary chapel

- Location within Poland
- Coordinates: 54°13′33.24″N 20°27′39.96″E
- Country: Poland
- Voivodeship: Warmian-Masurian
- County: Bartoszyce
- Gmina: Górowo Iławeckie
- Population: 540

Janikowo [janiˈkɔvɔ] is a village in the administrative district of Gmina Górowo Iławeckie, within Bartoszyce County, Warmian-Masurian Voivodeship, in northern Poland, close to the border with the Kaliningrad Oblast of Russia.

== Population ==
- 1933: 462
- 1939: 457
