= Wągniki, Bartoszyce County =

Wągniki
- Village
- Location within Poland
- Coordinates: 54°16′21″N 20°24′17″E
- Country: Poland
- Voivodeship: Warmian-Masurian
- County: Bartoszyce
- Gmina: Górowo Iławeckie
- Population: 70

Wągniki [vɔnɡˈniki] is a village in the administrative district of Gmina Górowo Iławeckie, within Bartoszyce County, Warmian-Masurian Voivodeship, in northern Poland, close to the border with the Kaliningrad Oblast of Russia.
