= Nowa Karczma, Warmian-Masurian Voivodeship =

Nowa Karczma
- Village
- Location within Poland
- Coordinates: 54°15′51″N 20°37′01″E
- Country: Poland
- Voivodeship: Warmian-Masurian
- County: Bartoszyce
- Gmina: Górowo Iławeckie
- Population: 235

Nowa Karczma [ˈnɔva ˈkart͡ʂma] is a village in the administrative district of Gmina Górowo Iławeckie, within Bartoszyce County, Warmian-Masurian Voivodeship, in northern Poland, close to the border with the Kaliningrad Oblast of Russia.
