= Gniewkowo, Mrągowo County =

Gniewkowo
- Location within Poland Location within Warmian-Masurian Voivodeship
- Coordinates: 53°38′35″N 21°22′37″E
- Country: Poland
- Voivodeship: Warmian-Masurian
- County: Mrągowo
- Gmina: Mrągowo
- Time zone: UTC+1 (CET)
  - Summer (DST): UTC+2 (CEST)
- Postal code: 11-700
- Car plates: NMR

Gniewkowo (Polish: [ɡɲɛfˈkɔ.vɔ]) is a former settlement, currently located within the village of Gronowo, Warmian-Masurian Voivodeship, Poland, located in the Gmina Mrągowo, Mrągowo County. It is located in the region of Masuria.

== History ==
Gniewkowo used to be a folwark near Gronowo. In 1838, it had 1 house, inhabited by 11 people. In 1871, the owner of Gniewkowo and Gronowo was Fresin, who rent the area to his relative, that lived in Gniewkowo. In 1907, the owner of the land consisting of Gronowo and Gniewkowo, with the size of 675 ha, was Rittmeister Georg von Fresin. Until 1945 its name was Heinrichssorge, with the name Vorwerk Heinrichssorge being additionally used between 1938 and 1945. After the area being given to Poland after the end of World War II, it was renamed to the name Owczarnia. In 1949 it was renamed to the name Gniewkowo. In 1973, the village was located within the sołectwo of Gronowo, though its name wasn't used in the village's census from that year.

Currently, the settlement is located within the village of Gronowo, with the name not being used anymore by settlements lists such as TERYT and PRNG.
