= Dobrzynka, Warmian-Masurian Voivodeship =

Dobrzynka
- Village
- Location within Poland
- Coordinates: 54°17′24″N 20°17′46″E
- Country: Poland
- Voivodeship: Warmian-Masurian
- County: Bartoszyce
- Gmina: Górowo Iławeckie

Dobrzynka [dɔˈbʐɨnka] (German: Guttenfeld) is a village in the administrative district of Gmina Górowo Iławeckie, within Bartoszyce County, Warmian-Masurian Voivodeship, in northern Poland, close to the border with the Kaliningrad Oblast of Russia.
