= Pareżki =

- Village
- Location within Poland
- Coordinates: 54°20′0″N 20°26′23″E
- Country: Poland
- Voivodeship: Warmian-Masurian
- County: Bartoszyce
- Gmina: Górowo Iławeckie

Pareżki [paˈrɛʂki] (German: Parösken) is a village in the administrative district of Gmina Górowo Iławeckie, within Bartoszyce County, Warmian-Masurian Voivodeship, in northern Poland, close to the border with the Kaliningrad Oblast of Russia.

== Population ==
- 1933: 145
- 1939: 225
