= Wokiele =

- Village
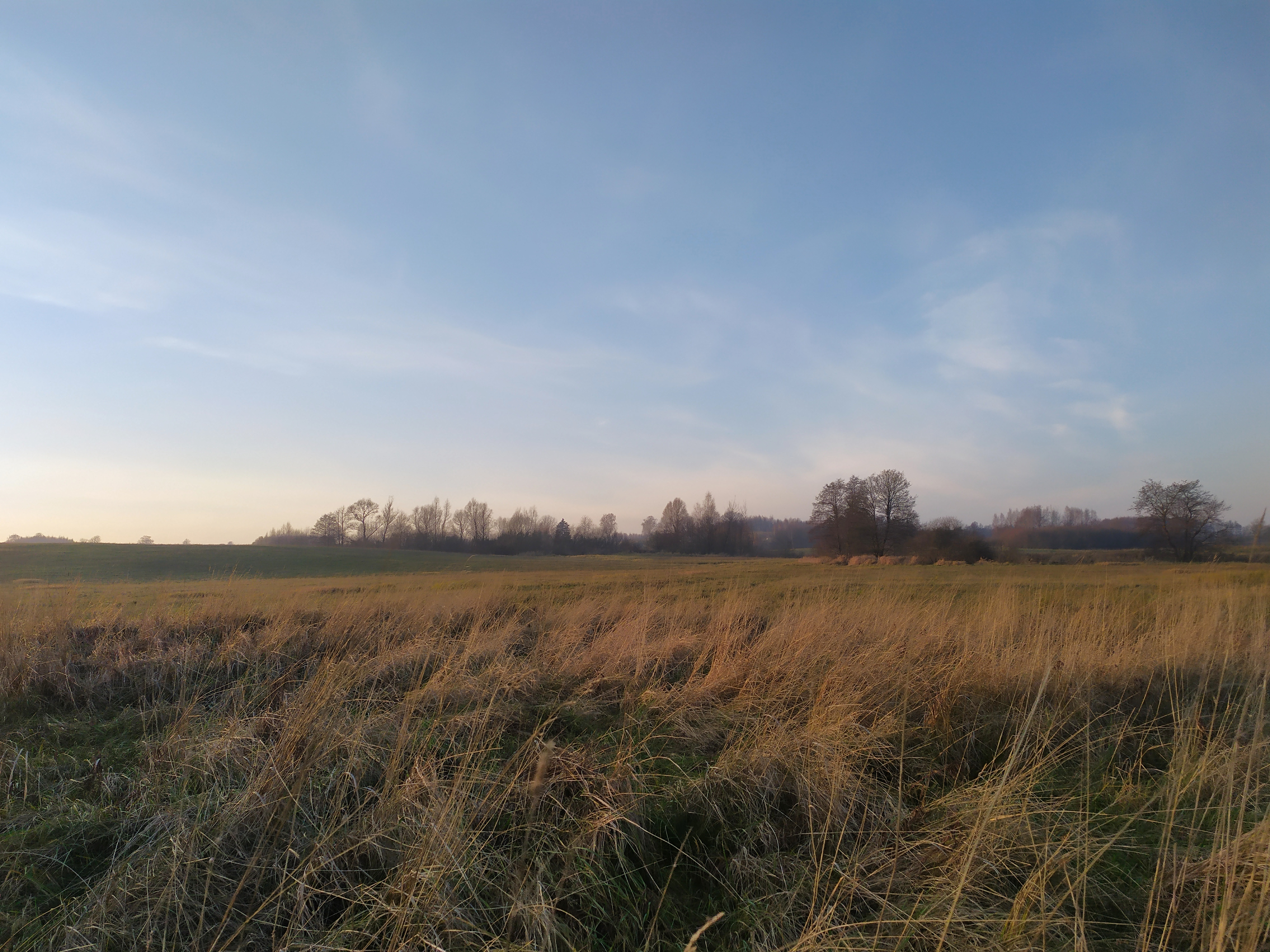

- Location within Poland
- Coordinates: 54°19′37″N 20°33′05″E
- Country: Poland
- Voivodeship: Warmian-Masurian
- County: Bartoszyce
- Gmina: Górowo Iławeckie

Wokiele [vɔˈkʲɛlɛ] (German: Wokellen) is a village in the administrative district of Gmina Górowo Iławeckie, within Bartoszyce County, Warmian-Masurian Voivodeship, in northern Poland, close to the border with the Kaliningrad Oblast of Russia.

The village was mentioned in 1570 as Wockellenn, in 1785 as Wockellen. In 1889 it was a 279 ha estate belonging to the Struve family who were also owners of the nearby village of Piasty Wielkie. It was marked in a map from 1907 as Gut Wokellen.
