= Klaas Reimer =

Klaas Reimer (1770–1837) was the founder of the Kleine Gemeinde, a Mennonite denomination that still exists in Latin America, but underwent radical changes in Canada where it is now called the Evangelical Mennonite Conference. Ethnic Mennonite remigrants from Latin America brought the original Kleine Gemeinde back to Canada and the US.

== Biography ==
Reimer was born in 1770 to Heinrich Reimer and Agatha Epp (b. 1745) in the Vistula delta Mennonite settlement of Petershagen, Prussia, located about 35 km east of the city of Danzig (Gdańsk). Heinrich died while his son was still young; his mother later remarried Abraham Janzen (1747–1822), a wealthy farmer. During his childhood, Reimer received no formal education.

At age twenty, Klaas was baptized and accepted into the Danzig Mennonite fellowship. In 1792, he moved to Neuenhuben, a village just east of Danzig, where he joined a newly established Werder Gemeinde, a Mennonite splinter church.

Six years later, at the age of 28, Klaas married Maria Epp (1760–1806), who was ten years his senior. Maria was the daughter of Peter Epp, a highly influential Mennonite church leader. Maria died in 1806 at age 46. Klaas and Maria had only one child, Aganetha, who was born in 1801, who later dies an early death in Russia. About three months after his first wife died, Reimer remarried to Helena von Riesen (1787–1846), together they had ten children, of which three sons and two daughters survived to adulthood.

Reimer was ordained into the ministry in 1801. In 1804, he led a group of about 30 adults in an immigration to south Russia, settling in the newly opened Mennonite colony, Molotschna, in the spring of 1805. Here, Reimer was frequently in conflict with the elder of the colony, Jacob Enns, who attempted to have the local authorities silence him. Reimer appealed to Chortitza elder Johann Wiebe, only to be threatened by Wiebe with banishment if he did not stop his activities. The struggle finally came to a head in 1812, when Reimer and eighteen of his followers began to hold their own church meetings in private homes. Seen as a secession by the Molotschna leadership, Reimer was threatened with dire punishment, including exile to Siberia. Reimer was joined by another minister, Cornelius Janzen, and about 20 members, who together recognized themselves as a separate church body in 1814. Similar groups in several villages seceded at the same time. These later united to form the Kleine Gemeinde, which was recognized by the Russian government and granted the same rights and privileges of the main Mennonite group. The hostility against Reimer and his fellowship toned down somewhat a few years later, when Elder Enns died.

Reimer's challenges were not limited to the main Mennonite body from which they separated. He also faced difficult challenges within his own fellowship. A crisis that has been called the false-humility movement almost destroyed the Kleine Gemeinde in 1828–29 and for a time threatened his leadership. A faction within the church apparently dwelt on guilt and fear and attempted a daily routine of extreme asceticism and self-inflicted punishment. When Reimer strongly admonished this faction in a sermon, many in the congregation walked out in disapproval. At a special meeting, his leadership was challenged and barely survived a vote of confidence. Over time, the movement subsided and Reimer regained control of the fellowship.

On December 18, 1837, Klaas Reimer died in Lindenau, Molotschna, South Russia at the age of 67 years.

=== Legacy ===
Reimer remains a controversial figure in Mennonite history. One of Reimer's prominent critics was Mennonite historian Peter M. Friesen (1849–1914) who wrote that Reimer was "devoid of any joyous knowledge of God's grace" and that his movement "was too narrow-minded, too frightened, too isolationist and opposed to education, it never made a profound impact." Delbert Plett, an outspoken advocate of Reimer, writes that "Klaas Reimer was a conservative intellectual whose voice speaks with singular clarity over the centuries."

Reimer's autobiography, penned in 1836, has been translated into English and published in the book Leaders by Mennonite historian Delbert Plett.

Direct descendants of Klaas Reimer include authors Miriam Toews, David Bergen, Casey Plett and Andrew Unger.
