= Toprzyny =

- Village
- Location within Poland
- Coordinates: 54°21′25″N 20°34′49″E
- Country: Poland
- Voivodeship: Warmian-Masurian
- County: Bartoszyce
- Gmina: Górowo Iławeckie

Toprzyny [tɔˈpʂɨnɨ] (German: Topprienen) is a village in the administrative district of Gmina Górowo Iławeckie, within Bartoszyce County, Warmian-Masurian Voivodeship, in northern Poland, close to the border with the Kaliningrad Oblast of Russia.

== Population ==
- 1820:120
- 1846:155
- 1871:313
- 1895:217
- 1930:490
- 1939:439
