= Glądy, Bartoszyce County =

Glądy
- Village
- Location within Poland
- Coordinates: 54°14′6″N 20°25′26″E
- Country: Poland
- Voivodeship: Warmian-Masurian
- County: Bartoszyce
- Gmina: Górowo Iławeckie
- Population: 270

Glądy [ˈɡlɔndɨ] is a village in the administrative district of Gmina Górowo Iławeckie, within Bartoszyce County, Warmian-Masurian Voivodeship, in northern Poland, close to the border with the Kaliningrad Oblast of Russia.

== Population ==
- 1933: 673
- 1939: 660
