= Pudlikajmy =

- Village
- Location within Poland
- Coordinates: 54°11′38″N 20°29′43″E
- Country: Poland
- Voivodeship: Warmian-Masurian
- County: Bartoszyce
- Gmina: Górowo Iławeckie

Pudlikajmy [pudliˈkai̯mɨ] (German: Pudelkeim) is a village in the administrative district of Gmina Górowo Iławeckie, within Bartoszyce County, Warmian-Masurian Voivodeship, in northern Poland, close to the border with the Kaliningrad Oblast of Russia.

== Population ==
- 1933: 196
- 1939: 181
