= Kumkiejmy =

- Village
- Location within Poland
- Coordinates: 54°21′N 20°31′E
- Country: Poland
- Voivodeship: Warmian-Masurian
- County: Bartoszyce
- Gmina: Górowo Iławeckie

Kumkiejmy [kumˈkʲɛi̯mɨ] is a village in the administrative district of Gmina Górowo Iławeckie, within Bartoszyce County, Warmian-Masurian Voivodeship, in northern Poland, close to the border with the Kaliningrad Oblast of Russia.

== Population ==
- 1933: 356
- 1939: 389
