= Kumkiejmy Przednie =

- Village
- Location within Poland
- Coordinates: 54°20′22″N 20°32′56″E
- Country: Poland
- Voivodeship: Warmian-Masurian
- County: Bartoszyce
- Gmina: Górowo Iławeckie

Kumkiejmy Przednie [kumˈkʲɛi̯mɨ ˈpʂɛdɲɛ] is a village in the administrative district of Gmina Górowo Iławeckie, within Bartoszyce County, Warmian-Masurian Voivodeship, in northern Poland, close to the border with the Kaliningrad Oblast of Russia.
