= Warszkajty =

- Village
- Location within Poland
- Coordinates: 54°21′32″N 20°38′3″E
- Country: Poland
- Voivodeship: Warmian-Masurian
- County: Bartoszyce
- Gmina: Górowo Iławeckie
- Population: 0

Warszkajty [varʂˈkai̯tɨ] (German: Warschkeiten)is a former village in the administrative district of Gmina Górowo Iławeckie, within Bartoszyce County, Warmian-Masurian Voivodeship, in northern Poland, directly at the border to the Kaliningrad Oblast of Russia.

== Population ==
- 1933: 286
- 1939: 321
