= Piaseczno, Bartoszyce County =

Piaseczno
- Village
- Location within Poland
- Coordinates: 54°13′08″N 20°33′04″E
- Country: Poland
- Voivodeship: Warmian-Masurian
- County: Bartoszyce
- Gmina: Górowo Iławeckie

Piaseczno [pjaˈsɛt͡ʂnɔ] is a village in the administrative district of Gmina Górowo Iławeckie, within Bartoszyce County, Warmian-Masurian Voivodeship, in northern Poland, close to the border with the Kaliningrad Oblast of Russia.
