= Wiewiórki, Warmian-Masurian Voivodeship =

Wiewiórki
- Village
- Location within Poland
- Coordinates: 54°16′29″N 20°34′19″E
- Country: Poland
- Voivodeship: Warmian-Masurian
- County: Bartoszyce
- Gmina: Górowo Iławeckie
- Population: 380

Wiewiórki [vjɛˈvjurki] (German: Eichhorn) is a village in the administrative district of Gmina Górowo Iławeckie, within Bartoszyce County, Warmian-Masurian Voivodeship, in northern Poland, close to the border with the Kaliningrad Oblast of Russia.

== History ==
Eichhorn has been founded by German settlers throughout the Ostsiedlung in the Monastic state of the Teutonic Knights and was first mentioned in 1414, when the settlement was damaged by Polish troops in the Polish-Teutonic Hunger War. In 1419 the local Inn was mentioned as desolate, in 1437 the existing 46 "Hufen", a square measure of the Teutonic Knights, were cultivated, while the Inn was still desolate. Eichhorn has been property of the Teutonic Order and the Dukes of Prussia until about 1600, when it was bought by the von Lehndorff family and changed its landlords until the abolition of serfdom in Prussia. In 1833 23 farmers, 6 cottagers and 6 craftsmen were living in the village.

== Population ==
- 1820: 247
- 1846: 352
- 1871: 468
- 1895: 416
- 1930: 386
- 1939: 337
