= Malinowo, Bartoszyce County =

Malinowo
- Settlement
- Location within Poland
- Coordinates: 54°19′22″N 20°23′26″E
- Country: Poland
- Voivodeship: Warmian-Masurian
- County: Bartoszyce
- Gmina: Górowo Iławeckie

Malinowo [maliˈnɔvɔ] is a settlement in the administrative district of Gmina Górowo Iławeckie, within Bartoszyce County, Warmian-Masurian Voivodeship, in northern Poland, close to the border with the Kaliningrad Oblast of Russia.
