= Czyprki, Bartoszyce County =

Czyprki
- Village
- Location within Poland
- Coordinates: 54°19′18″N 20°33′45″E
- Country: Poland
- Voivodeship: Warmian-Masurian
- County: Bartoszyce
- Gmina: Górowo Iławeckie
- Population: 124

Czyprki [ˈt͡ʂɨprki] (German: Zipperken) is a village in the administrative district of Gmina Górowo Iławeckie, within Bartoszyce County, Warmian-Masurian Voivodeship, in northern Poland, close to the border with the Kaliningrad Oblast of Russia.

The village was founded in the 14th century under the name Tapperlauken. In 1537 the village was purchased by Merten Zipperka and already in 1570 it appeared in the records under the new name Zipperken.
