= Dwórzno, Warmian-Masurian Voivodeship =

Dwórzno
- Village
- Location within Poland
- Coordinates: 54°15′N 20°28′E
- Country: Poland
- Voivodeship: Warmian-Masurian
- County: Bartoszyce
- Gmina: Górowo Iławeckie
- Population: 580

Dwórzno [ˈdvuʐnɔ] (German: Hoofe) is a village in the administrative district of Gmina Górowo Iławeckie, within Bartoszyce County, Warmian-Masurian Voivodeship, in northern Poland, close to the border with the Kaliningrad Oblast of Russia.

Hoofe was the scene of the "Bataille de Hoff" throughout the Napoleonic Battle of Eylau in February 1807.

== Population ==
- 1933: 531
- 1939: 519
