= Gronowo, Mrągowo County =

Gronowo
- Village
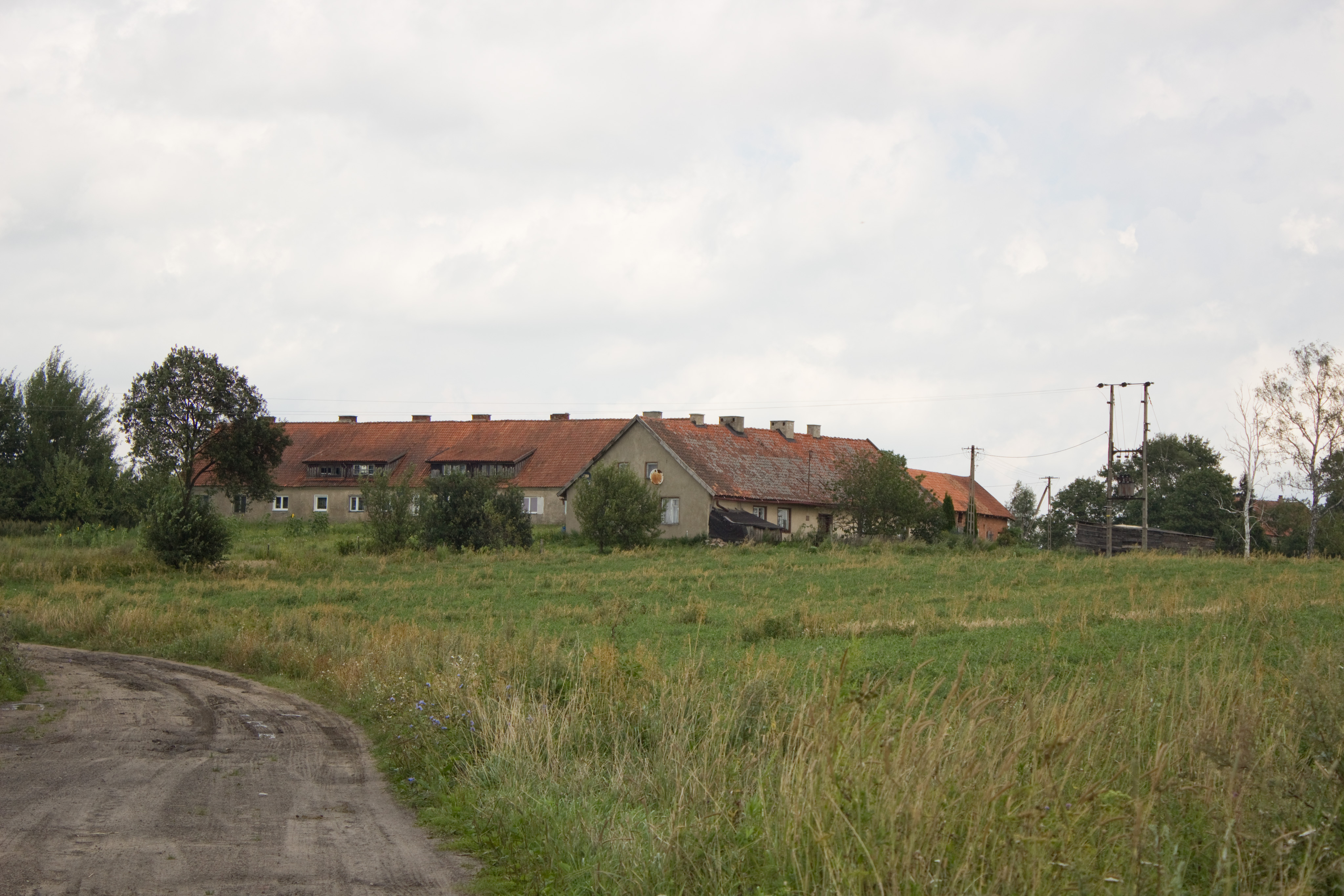

- Location within Poland
- Coordinates: 53°59′N 21°22′E
- Country: Poland
- Voivodeship: Warmian-Masurian
- County: Mrągowo
- Gmina: Mrągowo
- Postal code: 11-700
- Vehicle registration: NMR

Gronowo [ɡrɔˈnɔvɔ] is a village in the administrative district of Gmina Mrągowo, within Mrągowo County, Warmian-Masurian Voivodeship, in northern Poland. It is located in the region of Masuria.

As a result of the Treaty of Versailles the 1920 East Prussian plebiscite was organized on 11 July 1920 under the control of the League of Nations, which resulted in 80 votes to remain in Germany and none for Poland. Thus the village remained part of Germany until 1945.
