= Górowo Iławeckie =

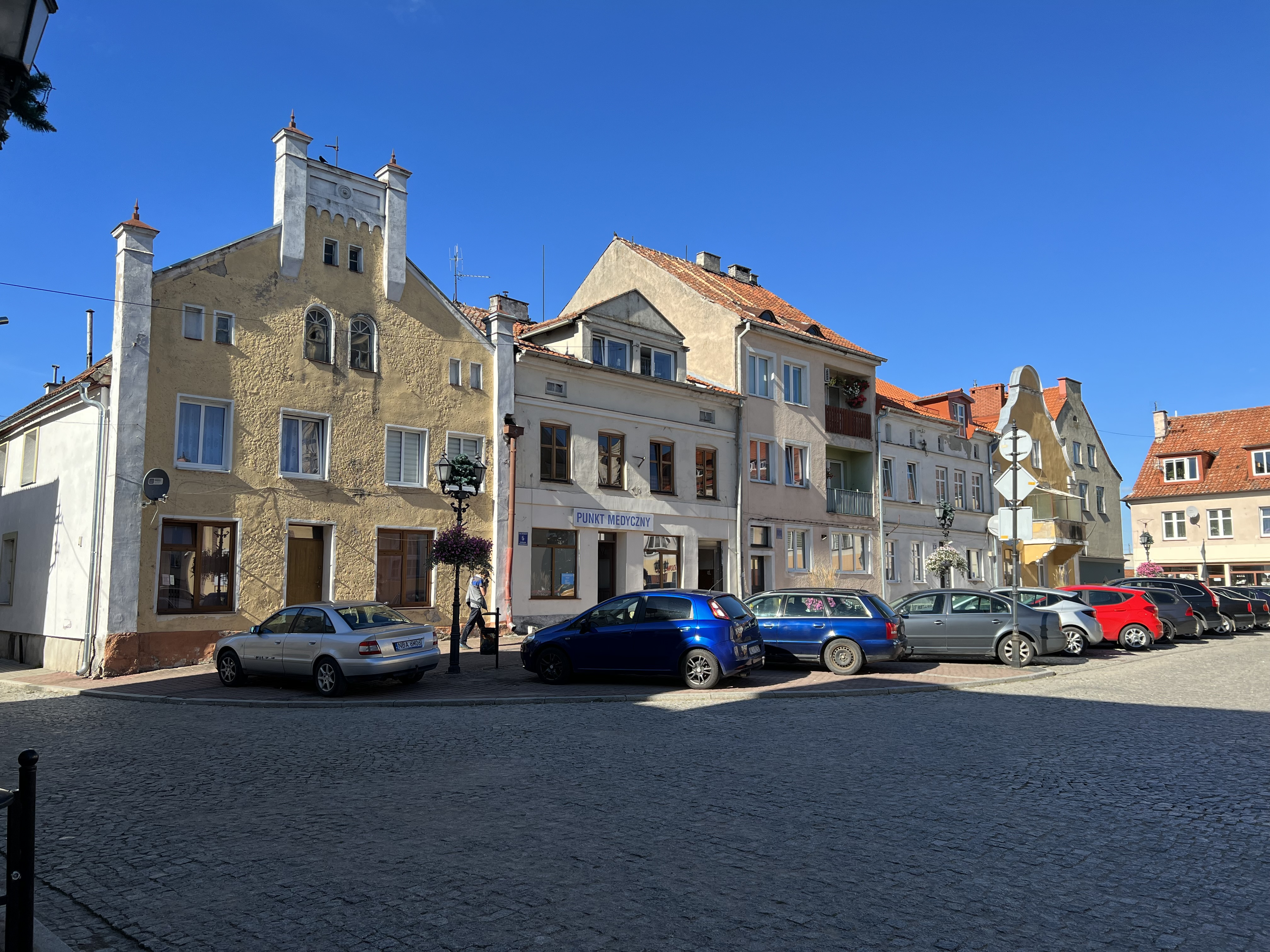
- Old Town

- Coat of arms
- Interactive map of Górowo Iławeckie
- Location within Poland
- Coordinates: 54°17′10″N 20°29′30″E
- Country: Poland
- Voivodeship: Warmian-Masurian
- County: Bartoszyce
- Gmina: Górowo Iławeckie (urban gmina)
- Established: 14th century

Area
  - Total: 3.32 km^{2} (1.28 sq mi)

Population (2016)
  - Total: 4,068
  - Density: 1,230/km^{2} (3,170/sq mi)
- Time zone: UTC+1 (CET)
  - Summer (DST): UTC+2 (CEST)
- Postal code: 11-220
- Vehicle registration: NBA
- Website: http://www.gorowoilaweckie.pl/

Górowo Iławeckie (Polish pronunciation: [ɡuˈrɔvɔ iwaˈvɛt͡skʲɛ]; German: Landsberg in Ostpreußen) or simply Górowo, is a town in northern Poland, located in the Bartoszyce County, Warmian-Masurian Voivodeship, with 4,068 inhabitants (2016). The town has a land area of 3.32 square kilometres (1.28 sq mi) and is the smallest municipality (gmina) in terms of geographical size in Poland.

== History ==
=== Early history ===
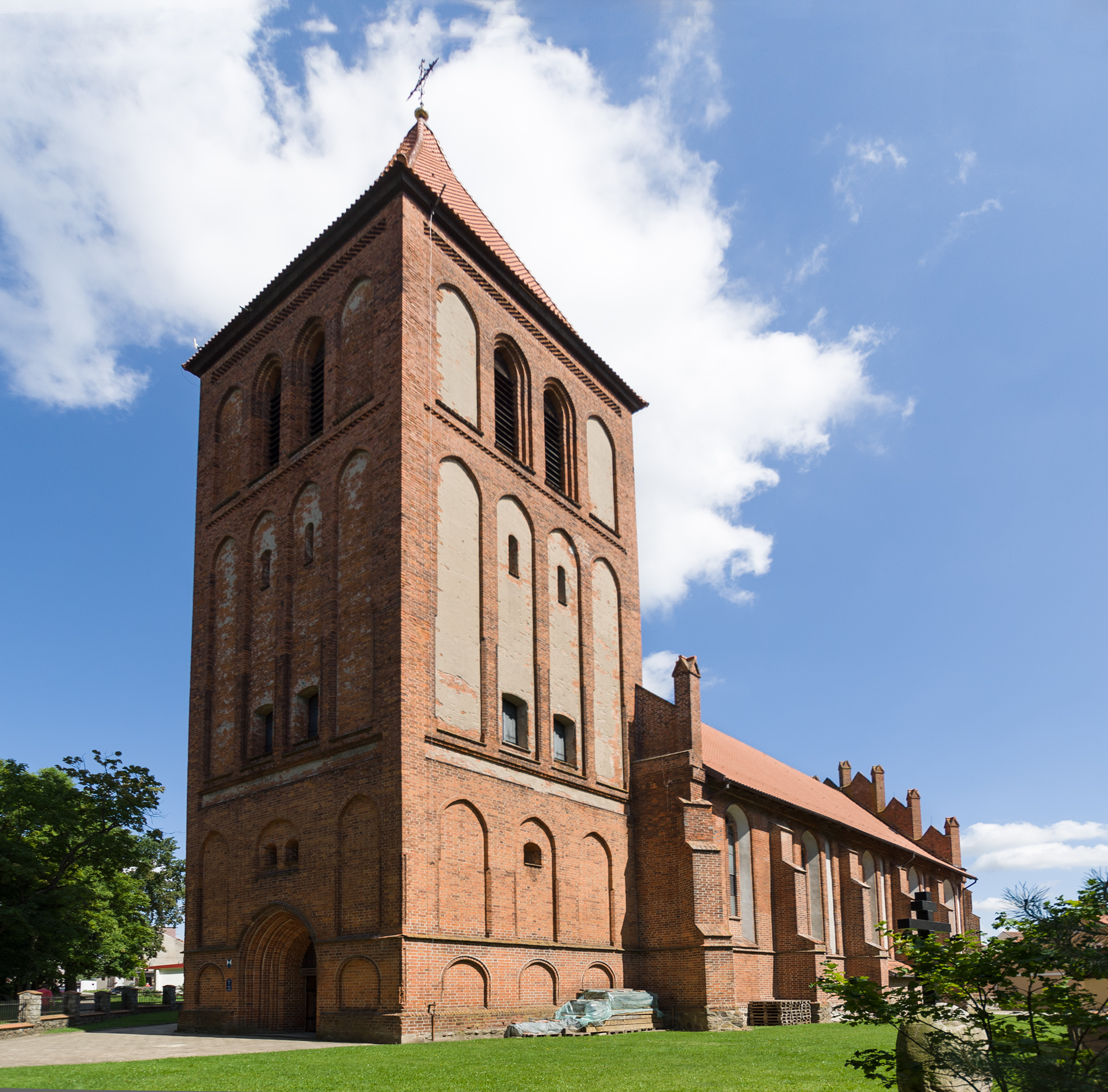
Gothic Exaltation of the Holy Cross church

The town was founded by the Teutonic Knights commander of Balga, Heinrich von Muro, on 5 February 1335 at the crossroads of Balga-Heilsberg (Lidzbark Warmiński) and Bartenstein (Bartoszyce)-Mehlsack (Pieniężno) in the heart of the Old Prussian region of Natangia. It was largely destroyed in the wars of 1414 and 1456.

In 1440, the town was a founding member of the Prussian Confederation opposing the Teutonic Order. In 1454, King Casimir IV Jagiellon, at the request of the confederation, signed the act of incorporation of the region to the Kingdom of Poland, an event that sparked the Thirteen Years’ War (1454–1466). The townspeople recognized the Polish King as rightful ruler, hence the town became part of Poland. After the Second Peace of Thorn in 1466 the Teutonic Order regained authority over the town as a fief of the Polish Crown. After 1525 it was held by the newly formed secular Ducal Prussia. After the battle of Grunwald and owing to the economic weakness following this defeat, the Teutonic Order was not able to pay off his debts to its mercenaries anymore, so the town was pawned to Nikolaus von Taubenheim in 1482. Throughout the centuries, the small town changed landlords, eventually the town was the property of the von Schwerin family from 1664 to 1808.

In 1710, 767 out of ca. 1000 inhabitants died of the plague.

=== The Napoleonic era ===
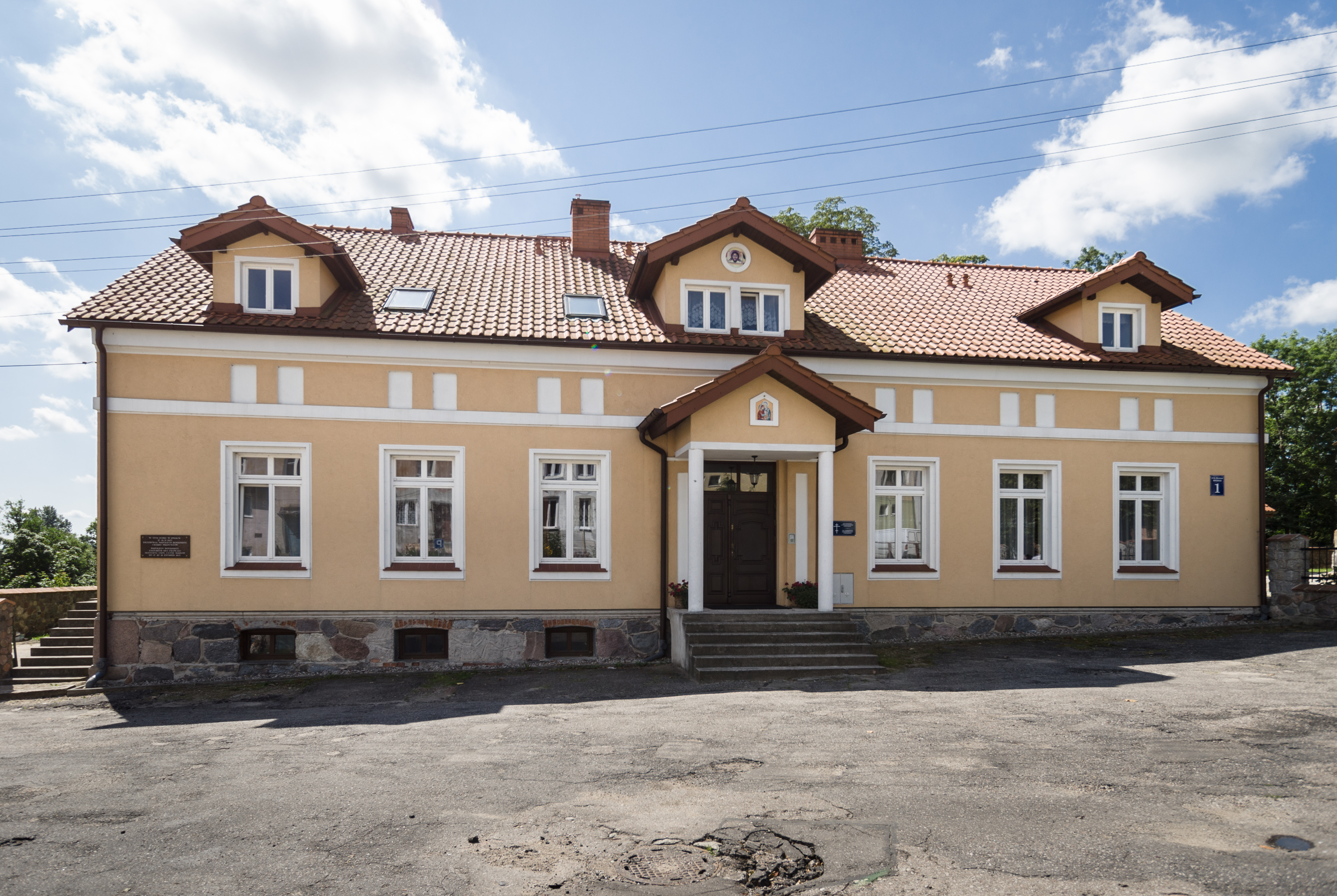
Place of stay of Napoleon on 17–18 February 1807

After the Battle of Eylau in February 1807, French Emperor Napoleon Bonaparte took lodging at the presbytery of the Lutheran church on 16–17 February 1807, just a few days after the Russian General Bagration. The church itself was used as a camp for Russian prisoners captured at Eylau and at the earlier battle of Hoofe (Dwórzno). 8,000 wounded French soldiers were left in Landsberg. The town suffered from these battles and lost almost half of its inhabitants in the year 1807 due to hunger and disease following this war; in February and March 1807 alone, 400 inhabitants of the Landsberg region died. In 1809, the town counted only 1126 inhabitants and was closer to a village.

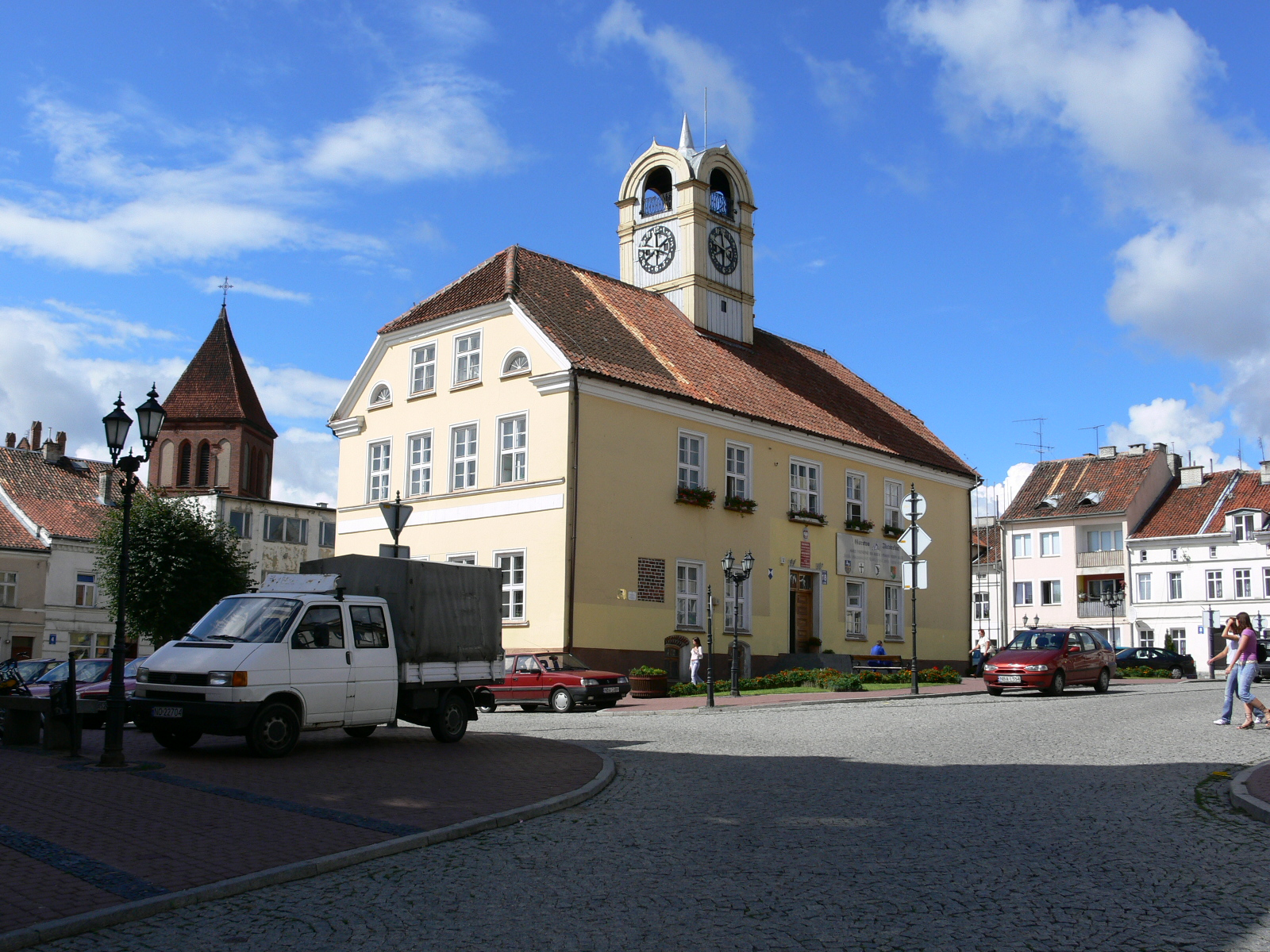
Town Hall

In 1811, parts of the Napoleonic Grande Armée marched through Landsberg on their way to Russia. About 40,000 French soldiers camped at the Landsberg area before marching on and had to be supplied with rations by the inhabitants.

=== 20th century ===
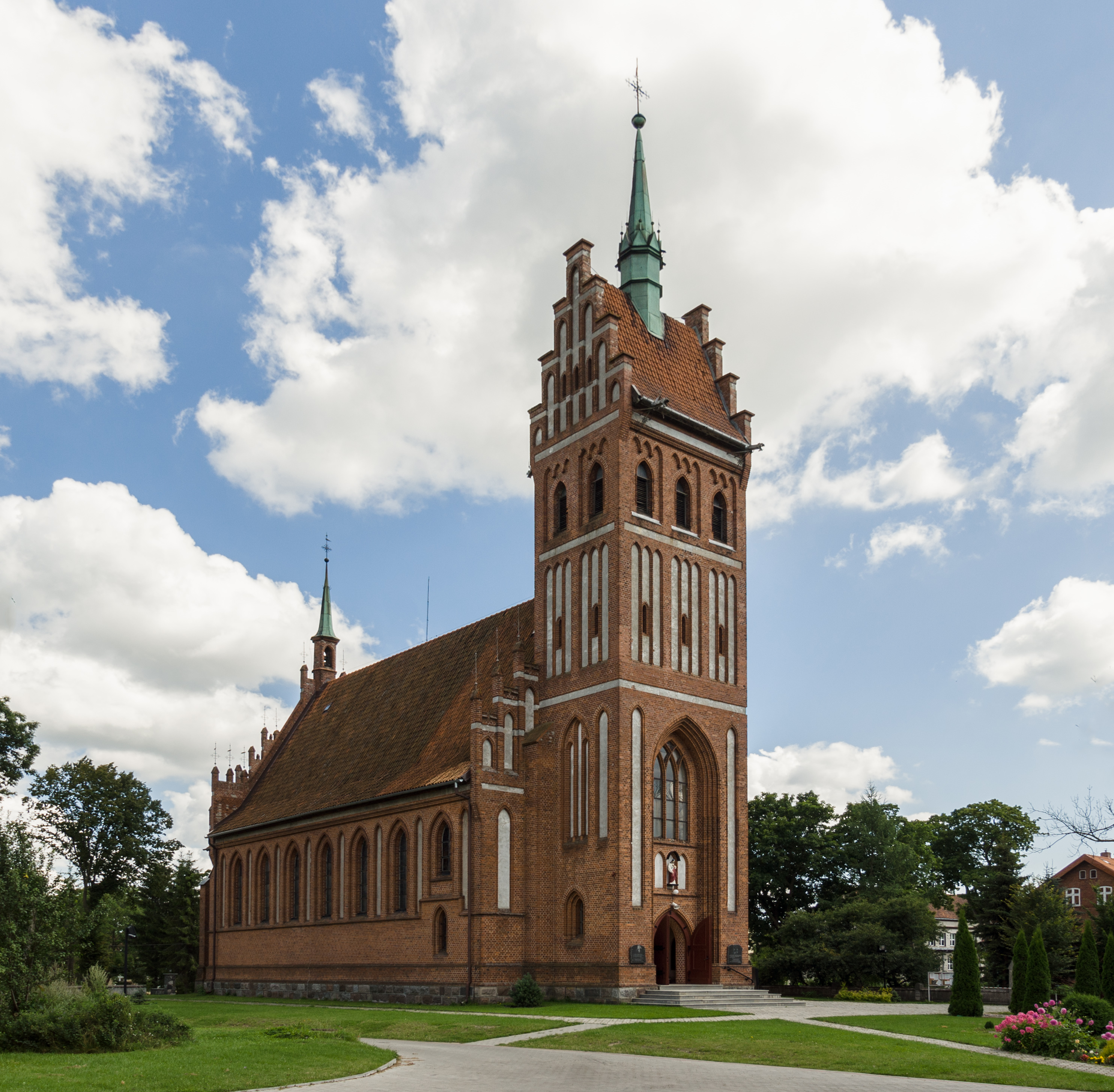
Gothic Revival Sacred Heart church

In 1871 Landsberg became part of Germany. In 1898, it was connected to the railway-line, and in 1908, a municipal gas factory was established, which is today a technical museum.

In the beginning of World War I, Russian troops conquered the town for a few days in late August 1914. Owing to some shootings by German soldiers, the post office, one house, and several barns were burned down and seven civilians were executed. A railway bridge was blown up. German troops reconquered the town on 2 September 1914 without fighting.

In February 1945, the town and its periphery was the scene for fierce battles between the Wehrmacht and the Red Army, which finally conquered the town on 2 February 1945. As an important travel nexus, a large number of civilians trying to escape from East Prussia were captured here. On 19 June 1945 representatives of the Polish administration came to the town and took over administrative power from the Soviet commandant. The seat of Iławka County was moved to Górowo after the Polish administration was expelled from Iławka in December 1945 by the Soviet Union, which unilaterally annexed the northern part of the county.

Following the Potsdam Conference, the German-speaking population was expelled in 1946/47, and the town was resettled with Polish citizens. The town was renamed to obtain the proper Polish name of Górowo. Along with Poles, especially from the Polish areas annexed by the Soviet Union, a remarkable number of people of Ukraine nationality were settled by force in the area of Górowo through Operation Vistula in 1947. Today a Ukrainian boarding school exists in Górowo, and the former Lutheran church is used by the Ukrainian Greek Catholic Church.

Górowo was the seat of Iławka County until 1958 and of the Górowo County until 1961, when the county was dissolved and Górowo became part of the Bartoszyce County.

== Sports ==
The local football team is Cresovia Górowo Iławeckie. It competes in the lower leagues.

== International relations ==
Górowo Iławeckie is a member of Cittaslow.

=== Twin towns — Sister cities ===
Górowo Iławeckie is twinned with:

- Verden an der Aller, Lower Saxony, Germany
- Bagrationovsk, Kaliningrad Oblast, Russia
- Pustomyty, Ukraine

== Bibliography ==
- Horst Schulz, Preußisch Eylau - eine Kreisstadt in Ostpreußen, Lübeck 1998 (German)
- Horst Schulz, Der Kreis Preußisch Eylau, Verden 1983 (German)
- Mirosław Mycio, Monografia Miasta Górowo Iławeckie, Górowo 2001
