= Gmina Górowo Iławeckie =

Gmina Górowo Iławeckie Górowo Iławeckie Commune
- Gmina
- Interactive map of Gmina Górowo Iławeckie
- Coordinates (Górowo Iławeckie): 54°16′N 20°29′E
- Country: Poland
- Voivodeship: Warmian-Masurian
- County: Bartoszyce
- Seat: Górowo Iławeckie

Government
  - Mayor: Krzysztof Baran

Area
  - Total: 416.27 km^{2} (160.72 sq mi)

Population (2006)
  - Total: 7,270
  - Density: 17.5/km^{2} (45.2/sq mi)
- Website: http://gorowoil-ug.bip-wm.pl/public/

Gmina Górowo Iławeckie is a rural gmina (administrative district) in Bartoszyce County, Warmian-Masurian Voivodeship, in northern Poland, on the border with Russia. Its seat is the town of Górowo Iławeckie, although the town is not part of the territory of the gmina.

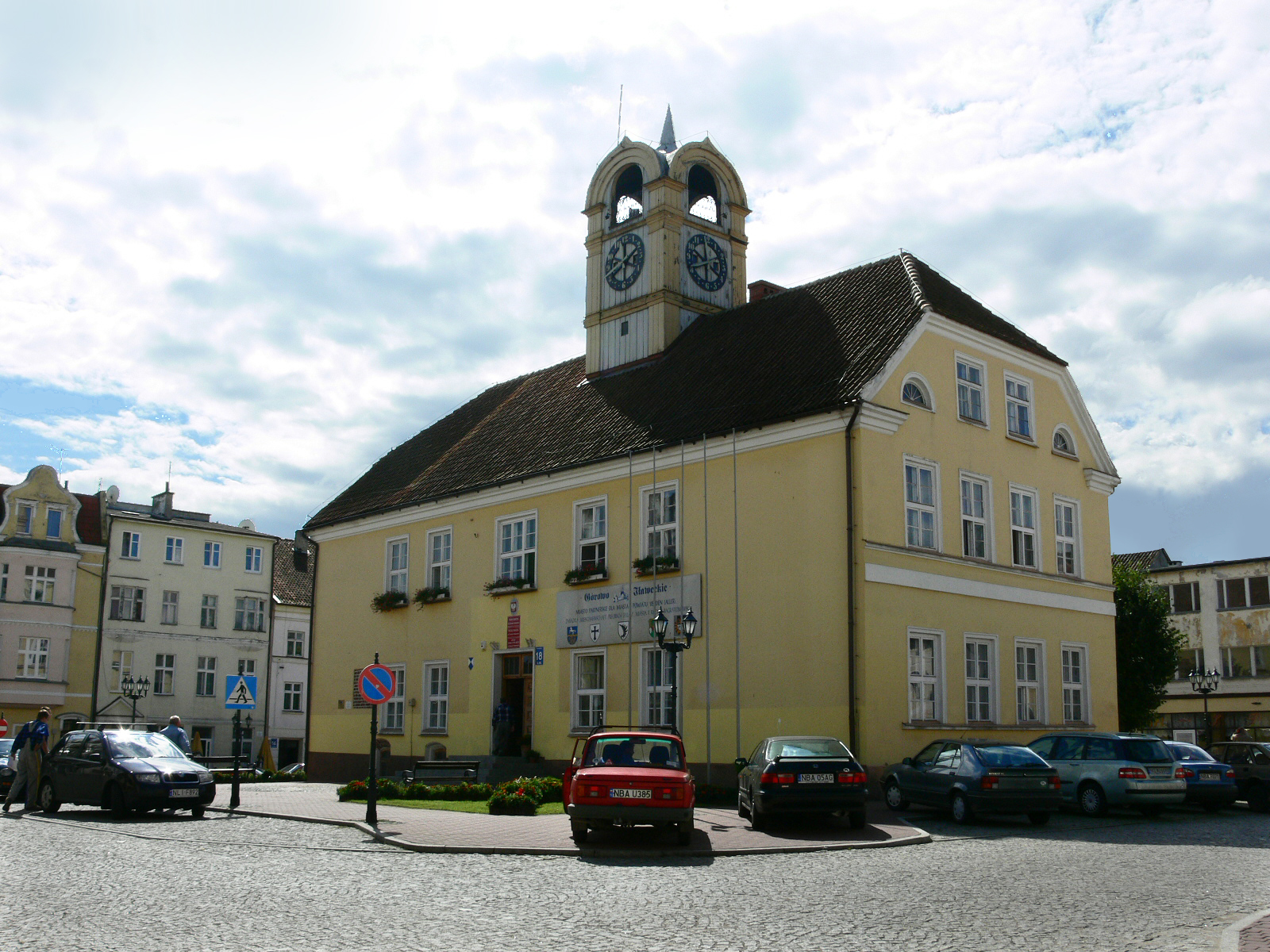

The gmina covers an area of 416.27 square kilometres (160.7 sq mi), and as of 2006 its total population is 7,270.

== Villages ==
Gmina Górowo Iławeckie contains the villages and settlements of Augamy, Bądle, Bądze, Bukowiec, Czyprki, Dęby, Deksyty, Dobrzynka, Dulsin, Dwórzno, Dzikowo Iławeckie, Gałajny, Galiny, Glądy, Gniewkowo, Grądzik, Grotowo, Gruszyny, Janikowo, Kamińsk, Kandyty, Kanie Iławeckie, Kiwajny, Krasnołąka, Kumkiejmy, Kumkiejmy Przednie, Lipniki, Lisiak, Malinowo, Nerwiki, Nowa Karczma, Nowa Wieś Iławecka, Okopek, Orsy, Paprocina, Pareżki, Paustry, Piaseczno, Piasek, Piasty Wielkie, Pieszkowo, Powiersze, Pudlikajmy, Reszkowo, Robity, Sągnity, Sigajny, Skarbiec, Sołtysowizna, Stabławki, Stega Mała, Toprzyny, Wągniki, Wągródka, Warszkajty, Weskajmy, Wiewiórki, Włodkowo, Wojmiany, Wokiele, Worławki, Wormie, Worszyny, Woryny, Zięby, Zielenica, Żołędnik and Żywkowo.

== Neighbouring gminas ==
Gmina Górowo Iławeckie is bordered by the town of Górowo Iławeckie and by the gminas of Bartoszyce, Lelkowo, Lidzbark Warmiński and Pieniężno. It also borders Russia (Kaliningrad oblast).

== Demographics ==
The gmina has a sizable Ukrainian catholic community. After the 2022 Russian invasion of Ukraine, the border with the Russian enclave Kaliningrad was closed, resulting in declining economic activity, and amidst fear of Russian intrusions, investors and tourists started avoiding the town, causing population decline and population ageing. In 2025 mayor Krzysztof Baran reported that there were just 30 children among the 6.400 inhabitants of the municipality.
