= Olsztyn Voivodeship =

Former administrative unit in Poland

Coordinates: 53°47′00″N 20°29′00″E

Olsztyn Voivodeship Województwo olsztyńskie
- Voivodeship of Poland
- 1946–1998
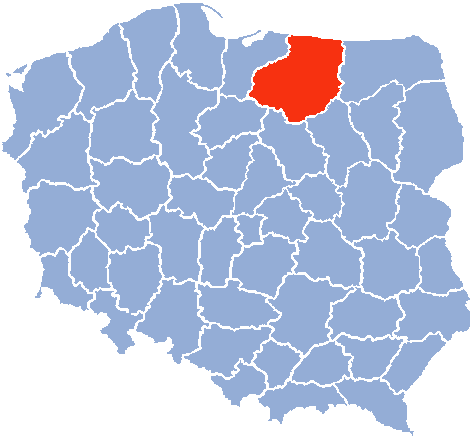
- Olsztyn Voivodship in 1975–1998
- Capital: Olsztyn
- History
  - Established: 1946
  - Disestablished: 31 December 1998
| Preceded by | Succeeded by |
| Masurian District | Warmian-Masurian Voivodeship |

Olsztyn Voivodeship (Polish: województwo olsztyńskie) was an administrative division and unit of local government in Poland in the years 1946–75, and a new territorial division between 1975–1998, superseded by Warmian-Masurian Voivodeship. Its capital city was Olsztyn.

From 1946 to 1975 the Olsztyn Voivodeship covered a larger area.

== Major cities and towns (population in 1995) ==
- Olsztyn (167,400)
- Ostróda (35,000)
- Iława (32,600)
- Kętrzyn (30,300)
- Szczytno (27,500)
- Bartoszyce (26,100)
- Mrągowo (22,500)

== See also ==
- Voivodeships of Poland
