= Masurian District =

Former district of Poland

Masurian District Okręg mazurski
- District of the Republic of Poland
- 1945–1946
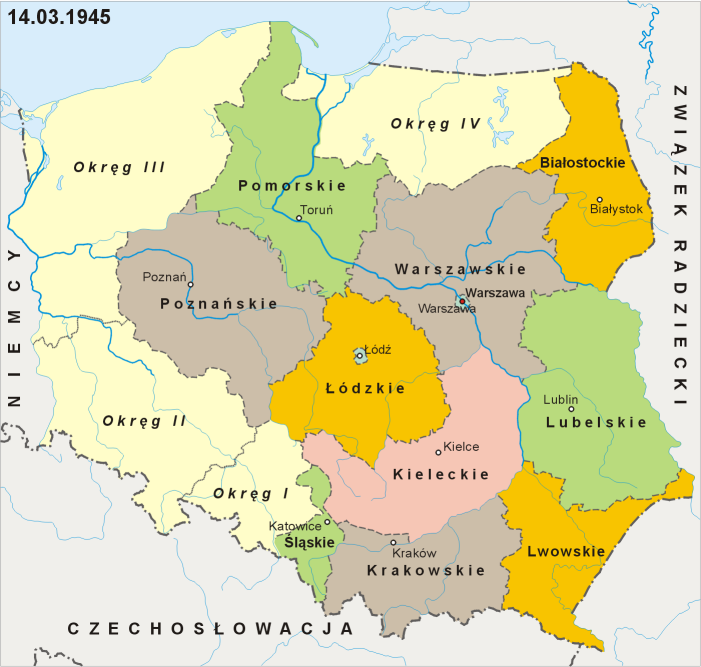
- The administrative subdivisions of Poland in 1945, including the Masurian District
- Government
- Attorney-in-fact
  - 1945–1946: Stanisław Piaskowski
- History
  - Established: 14 March 1945
  - Disestablished: 24 June 1946
- Contained within
  - Country: Provisional Government of the Republic of Poland (1945); Provisional Government of National Unity (1945–1946)
Preceded by
East Prussia
Reichsgau Danzig-West Prussia
Succeeded by
Olsztyn Voivodeship
Gdańsk Voivodeship
Białystok Voivodeship
Kaliningrad Oblast

The Masurian District, (Note: Polish: Okręg mazurski) also known as the District of East Prussia, (Note: Polish: okręg Prusy Wschodnie) and designated as the 4th District, (Note: Polish: Okręg IV) was a district that acted as a provisional administrative division of Poland, during the administration of the Provisional Government of the Republic of Poland in 1945, and the Provisional Government of National Unity from 1945 to 1946. It was centered around the areas of Masuria, Powiśle and Warmia.

It was established as one of four provisional districts on 14 March 1945.

On 25 September 1945, areas near its western border were incorporated into the Gdańsk Voivodeship, while the areas near its eastern border, to the Białystok Voivodeship. In December 1945, the Polish administration in Iławka was expelled by the Soviets, and the town, which was originally supposed to belong to Poland with the original border set one kilometer north of the town, was annexed to the Soviet Union. The Masurian District existed until 28 June 1946, when it was abolished and replaced with the Olsztyn Voivodeship.

The head of the district was the attorney-in-fact Stanisław Piaskowski.

== Gallery ==
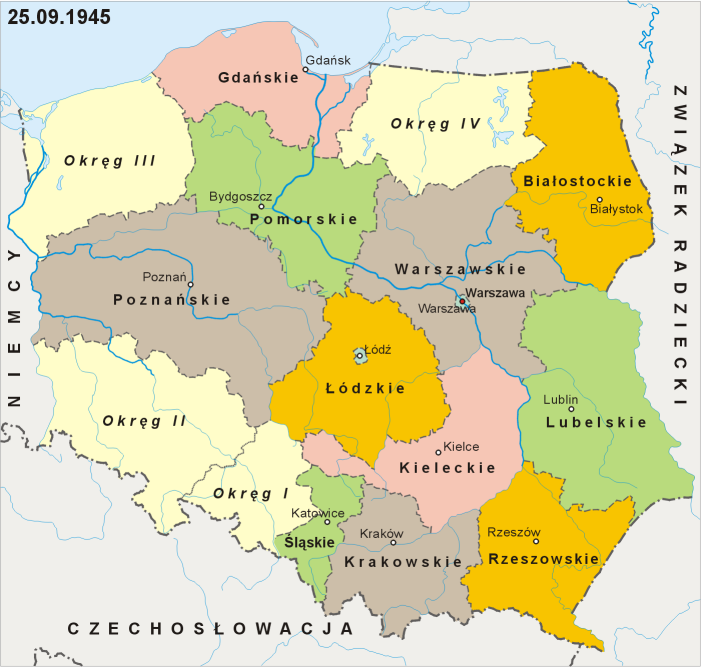
The administrative subdivisions of Poland from 25 September 1945 to 24 June 1946, including the District of Western Pomerania.

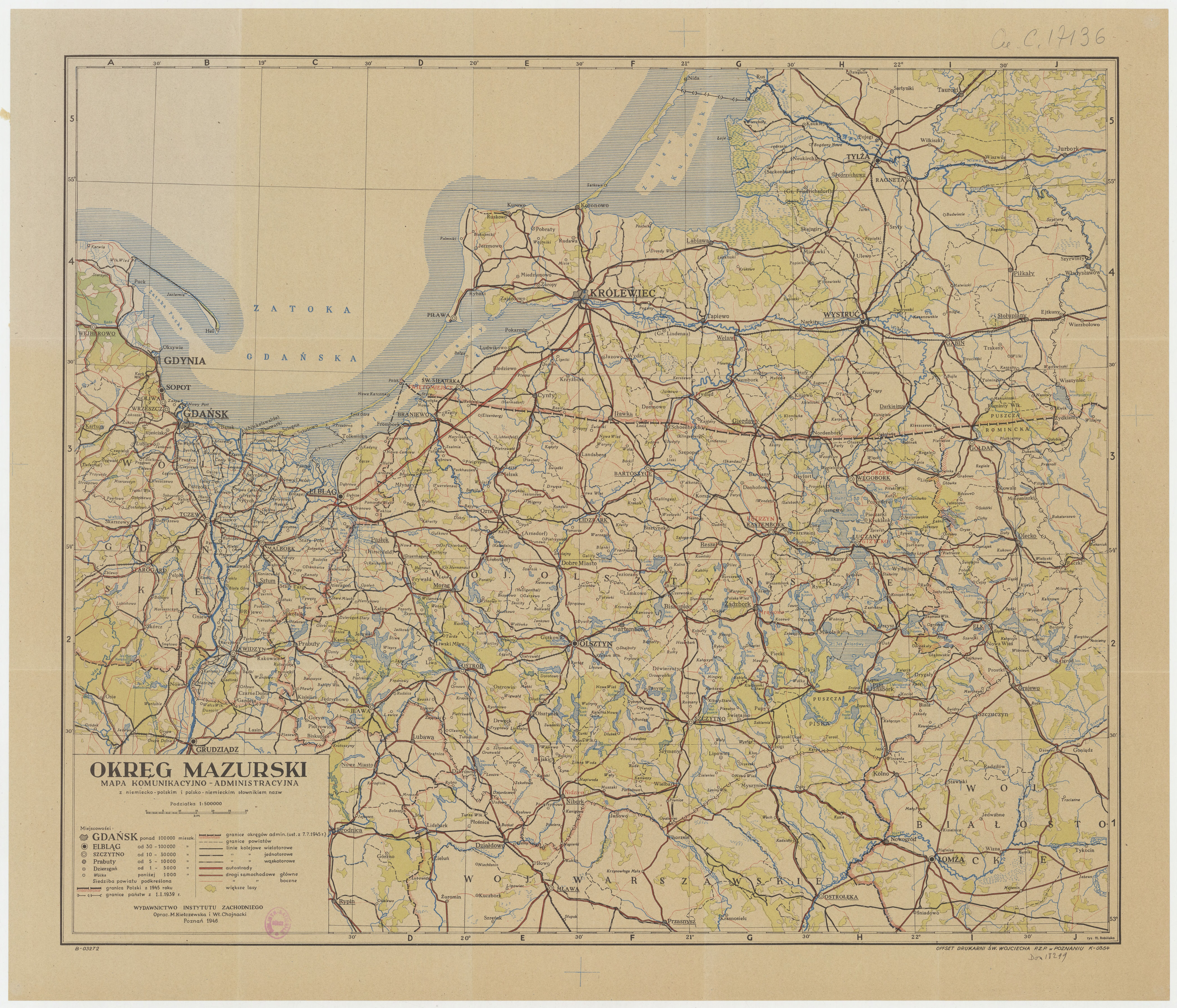
Map from 1946
