= Chimala Mission Hospital =

Geography
- Location: Chimala, Mbarali District, Mbeya Region, Tanzania
- Coordinates: 8.856361°S 34.025143°E

Organisation
- Religious affiliation: Dalraida Church of Christ

Services
- Beds: 128

History
- Opened: 1962

Links
- Website: www.chimalamission.com/hospital/
- Lists: Hospitals in Tanzania

The Chimala Mission Hospital is a Christian hospital located in Chimala, Mbarali District, Mbeya Region, Tanzania. The hospital has a monthly average of 750 in-patients, 750 monthly outpatients and 6,000 yearly patients in the HIV clinics. The hospital was founded in 1962.

== History ==
As Tanzania came out from under European rule in the 1960s, the Tanzanian government wished to remove any foreign influence from the country. The Chimala Mission was asked to leave the country, unless they could prove they were benefiting the people of Tanzania. So the administration of the Mission decided to construct a hospital. It began as a one-room metal-building that served as a clinic. Over the years, the hospital grew to be a 128-bed hospital that offers a number of services to the people of southern Tanzania.

== Services ==
The primary diagnoses treated are HIV/AIDS or related complications, TB, malaria, diarrheal diseases, and parasites.

Services offered include:

- Children's Ward
- Male Ward
- Female Ward
- OB/Labor and Delivery Ward
- Basic Surgical Services
- HIV Care
- Outpatient care
- X-ray services
- Laboratory services (hematocrit, blood typing, HIV testing, etc.)

== Employees ==
The hospital employs 3 medical officers, 3 clinical officers, and numerous nurses. Volunteer nurses, doctors, and students travel to Chimala each summer. Many of these volunteers are affiliated with Harding University.
