= Winnie Mpanju-Shumbusho =

Tanzanian paediatrician

- Born: Winifrida Kokwenda Mpanju; Maruku village, Kagera Region, Tanzania
- Education: University of Dar es Salaam (MD, MMed); Tulane University (MPH)
- Occupation: Paediatrician

Dr. Winnie Mpanju-Shumbusho is a Tanzanian paediatrician and public health leader who until December 31, 2015, served as World Health Organization (WHO) Assistant Director General for HIV/AIDS, Tuberculosis, Malaria and Neglected Tropical Diseases based in Geneva, Switzerland. From 2016 to 2019, she served as board chair of RBM Partnership To End Malaria. Before joining WHO in 1999, Mpanju-Shumbusho was Director General of The East, Central and Southern African Health Community (ECSA-HC) formerly known as the Commonwealth Regional Health Community for East, Central and Southern Africa (CRHC-ECSA).

Mpanju-Shumbusho is a co-founder, board member, and volunteer for the not-for-profit organization Adventures in Health, Education, and Agricultural Development (AHEAD Inc.), which was founded in 1981 to provide hands-on, people-to-people assistance to underserved communities in Africa and inner-city United States. She was also co-founder of the Medical Women Association of Tanzania and served as Treasurer and executive committee member of the Medical Association of Tanzania. In 2019, she was awarded the Multi-sector Partnership Honor by Malaria No More as one of the top Women Leading the Fight Against Malaria.

== Early life and education ==
Winifrida Kokwenda Mpanju was born near Bukoba, in Maruku village, Kagera Region in northwest Tanzania on the shores of Lake Victoria. She was eldest child of Omulangira Benedicto Timbilimu Mpanju (Late) and Omumbeija Paskazia Koburungo Mpanju. In part because of the health disparities she witnessed as a child, Mpanju-Shumbusho decided from a young age that medicine would be her calling. She went on to study medicine at Muhimbili Faculty of Medicine, University of Dar es Salaam, predecessor to Muhimbili University of Health and Allied Sciences (MUHAS), where she graduated with a Doctor of Medicine degree in 1979. From 1980 to 1981 she was the medical officer in-charge of historical Ocean Road Hospital (now Ocean Road Cancer Institute) in Dar es Salaam, the hospital first inaugurated in 1897 and historically famed as the site of Robert Koch’s seminal research in tropical diseases. As a recognition of Mpanju-Shumbusho's leadership qualities, in 1981 she was awarded the Hubert H. Humphrey North-South Fellowship for graduate study at Tulane University, New Orleans, Louisiana, United States. She graduated with a Master of Public Health degree from Tulane University School of Public Health and Tropical Medicine in 1982. Mpanju-Shumbusho obtained a Master of Medicine in Paediatrics and Child Health degree from the University of Dar Es Salaam's Muhimbili Faculty of Medicine in 1986. Mpanju-Shumbusho is married with two adult children.

== Career ==
=== Pediatrics and Community Health ===
Mpanju-Shumbusho's teaching and research career began in 1986 at her alma mater, Muhimbili University of Health and Allied Sciences, following her appointment to the university's faculty as a Senior Medical Officer and Senior Lecturer in Pediatrics, Child Health, and Community Health. During this time she was also a Consultant Pediatrician in the Department of Pediatrics and Child Health at Muhimbili National Hospital, Tanzania's largest referral and teaching hospital. Subsequently, she was appointed Head of the Department of Community Health, MUHAS, and Chief Public Health Adviser to the Tanzania Ministry of Health from 1986 to 1993. In this capacity, Mpanju-Shumbusho guided the strengthening of the medical school's training curriculum to include more community oriented and community based training, the model later emulated by other institutions in Eastern Africa, including Moi University, Kenya, and the University of Malawi College of Medicine in Malawi. She also spearheaded collaborations between MUHAS and various universities and national and international medical research institutions (e.g. Karolinska Institute in Sweden).

As the chief public health technical advisor to the Tanzania Ministry of Health, Mpanju-Shumbusho was a member of national public health steering committees and think tanks for establishment and review of Tanzania's national public health and primary health care programmes, including maternal and child health (MCH), expanded immunization, major communicable diseases, and water and sanitation. Mpanju-Shumbusho's contribution to the global effort for eradication of malaria started many decades ago. In the mid-1990s she was an international clinical monitor of the open randomized trial of artemether against quinine in the treatment of cerebral malaria in African children, which was conducted in Tanzania, Malawi, and Nigeria. Results from the study contributed significantly towards the WHO policy change to Artemisinin Combination Therapy as first-line treatment for malaria in endemic countries. In another study, Mpanju-Shumbusho served as the international clinical medical monitor for the SPF66 malaria vaccine trial conducted in Ifakara District and Ifakara Health Institute, Tanzania, from 1990 to 1995 under the sponsorship of WHO and the Special Programme for Research and Training in Tropical Diseases (TDR) and in collaboration with Prof. Peter Smith of the London School of Hygiene & Tropical Medicine and Dr Malcom Molyneux of Liverpool School of Tropical Medicine.

=== Director General East, Central, and Southern African Health community (1997–1999) ===
Mpanju-Shumbusho joined ECSA-HC (formerly CRHC-ECSA) in 1993 as Director of the Reproductive Health and Research Programme. The intergovernmental organization, headquartered in Arusha, Tanzania, was established in 1974 to foster and promote regional cooperation in health among Member States of Botswana, Kenya, Lesotho, Malawi, Mauritius, Mozambique, Namibia, Seychelles, South Africa, Swaziland, Tanzania, Uganda, Zambia, and Zimbabwe. In 1997, Mpanju-Shumbusho was appointed Director-General/Regional Secretary of ECSA-HC. As the organization's Director General and Head of Mission, she led the development and implementation of the first-ever ECSA-HC Five-Year Strategic Plan (1999–2004), which raised the international profile of ECSA-HC. She also initiated collaborations with various regional, international, and donor agencies, and mobilized resources from member states and donors, including the United States Agency for International Development (USAID), European Commission, Rockefeller Foundation, Wellstart International, WHO, and others.

=== World Health Organization ===
Mpanju-Shumbusho had many leadership roles within WHO since joining the UN Agency in 1999 as Director of the HIV/AIDS and Sexually Transmitted Infections Initiative, later renamed HIV/AIDS Department, the position she held until 2003. In this role she led the mainstreaming of HIV into the work of all relevant WHO Clusters and Departments, mobilization of WHO on HIV, and ensured integration of HIV into the various areas of work of the WHO, increased knowledge about HIV/AIDS within the WHO and advocacy to make the disease a priority. She directed the development of the first ever Global Health Sector Strategy for HIV/AIDS for the period 2003–2007 and development of the first ever WHO Guidelines for public health approach to scaling up antiretroviral therapy (ART) in resource limited settings. She was co-founder of the WHO 3by5 Initiative and directed the Organization's 3by5 country support activities for scaling up AIDS treatment globally. Subsequently, Mpanju-Shumbusho was appointed Senior Adviser to the Assistant Director General during which she concomitantly served as Director of the Office of WHO/Global Fund to Fight AIDS, Tuberculosis, and Malaria (Global Fund) Partnership and Technical Cooperation, overseeing WHO's work with global health partnerships. In addition to the Global Fund, other partners included UNAIDS, Stop TB Partnership, RBM Partnership, UNITAID, and TDR. The initiative entailed cross-cutting coordination with other WHO Clusters, including Health Systems Strengthening, Family and Community Health, the six WHO Regional Offices, and key donors and NGOs. From 2005 to 2015, Mpanju-Shumbusho was a board member of the Global Fund.

Mpanju-Shumbusho was appointed an Assistant Director General of WHO for HIV/AIDS, Tuberculosis, Malaria and Neglected Tropical Diseases. As WHO Assistant Director General, Mpanju-Shumbusho steered WHO's work in prevention, control, impact-mitigation, country support and global partnerships to combat the diseases under her purview and contributed significantly to the attainment of Millennium Development Goal (MDG) #6 and related MDGs. Her leadership ensured smooth and pragmatic transition between the MDG and the Sustainable Development Goals (SDG) frameworks. Her leadership of the WHO-Global Fund collaboration facilitated eligible countries’ acquisition of more than US$10 Billion from the Global Fund for combating diseases and strengthening health systems. Mpanju-Shumbusho retired from WHO on December 31, 2015.

=== Roll Back Malaria ===
Mpanju-Shumbusho joined the RBM Partnership To End Malaria Board in 2016 as board chair. She has dedicated her recent career to the journey for malaria elimination and universal health coverage. As Board Chair, she reinvigorated the Partnership and ensured it was on the forefront of global efforts to mobilise the necessary political will and resources to renew the fight to end malaria for good. She provided leadership that ensured vigor, cautioning that the partnerships, strategies, and tools that eliminated malaria in 27 countries, and that reduced malaria by more than half, saving nearly 7 million lives since 2000, are nevertheless not enough to end malaria for good, especially in the highest burden countries where the disease still thrives. Mpanju-Shumbusho continues to chair meetings for WHO and other international organizations focused on malaria eradication. She is the co-chair of the Lancet Commission on Malaria Eradication and has authored numerous publications advocating for initiatives to end new malarial infections. After completing her three-year term in 2019, Mpanju-Shumbusho passed the role onto her successor, Prof. Maha Taysir Barakat, former director-general of Health Authority Abu Dhabi.

=== Global Commission on Malaria Eradication ===
Mpanju-Shumbusho was co-senior author, alongside Prof. Richard Feachem, on the report from The Lancet in 2019 about malaria eradication within 30 years.

== See also ==
- Irene Tarimo
- Joyce Msuya
- Frannie Leautier
- Elizabeth Mrema
