= Dubrovka, Bagrationovsky District =

Settlement in Kaliningrad Oblast

Dubrovka Дубровка
- Rural locality
- Interactive map of Dubrovka
- Location of Dubrovka Dubrovka (European Russia) Dubrovka (Russia)
- Coordinates: 54°24′N 20°32′E
- Country: Russia
- Federal subject: Kaliningrad Oblast
- Administrative district: Bagrationovsky District

Population
  - Estimate (2010): 158 )
- Time zone: UTC+2 (MSK–1)
- Postal codes: 238430, 238431
- OKTMO ID: 27703000286

Dubrovka (Russian: Дубровка; Polish: Gierki) is a village in Bagrationovsky District of Kaliningrad Oblast, Russia, near the border with Poland.

Initially following World War II, in 1945, the villages passed to Poland as Gierki, Klusy and Piłsedy and were part of the Iławka County in the Masurian District, however, the villages were eventually annexed by the Soviet Union and merged under the new name Dubrovka.
