= Avgustovka, Kaliningrad Oblast =

Settlement in Kaliningrad Oblast

Avgustovka Августовка
- Rural locality
- Interactive map of Avgustovka
- Location of Avgustovka Avgustovka (European Russia) Avgustovka (Russia)
- Coordinates: 54°25′38″N 20°35′5″E
- Country: Russia
- Federal subject: Kaliningrad Oblast
- Administrative district: Bagrationovsky District

Population
  - Estimate (2010): 17 )
- Time zone: UTC+2 (MSK–1)
- Postal code: 238420
- OKTMO ID: 27703000261

Avgustovka (Russian: Августовка; Polish: Drąsyty) is a village in Bagrationovsky District of Kaliningrad Oblast, Russia, near the border with Poland.

Initially following World War II, in 1945, the village passed to Poland as Drąsyty and was part of the Iławka County in the Masurian District, however, it was eventually annexed by the Soviet Union and renamed to Avgustovka.
