= Mahongole =

Mahongole may refer to the following places in Tanzania:

- Mahongole, Iringa, in Njombe District
- Mahongole, Mbeya
