= BMH =

BMH is a three letter abbreviation that could mean:

- Bacchus Marsh railway station, Australia
- Bengbu South railway station, China Railway telegraph code BMH
- Benjamin Mkapa Hospital, located in Dodoma, Tanzania
- Big Momma's House, a 2000 comedy film starring Martin Lawrence and Nia Long
- Big Money Hustlas, a 1999 comedy film starring Detroit hip hop group Insane Clown Posse
- Bournemouth – ISO 3166-2:GB administrative division code GB-BMH
  - Bournemouth railway station
- Boyer–Moore–Horspool algorithm, an algorithm for finding substrings in strings
- British Military Hospital (disambiguation), hospitals provided for military personnel; esp. in foreign countries
- British Motor Holdings, UK company created with the merger of Jaguar and BMC in 1966
- Bureau of Military History, Irish military archive
- BMH also known as Burst My Head, moniker for Music Producer BolaBMH
- Black Magic Holiday/Bank Monday Holiday, noise mongrels from Warminster, Wiltshire, UK
