= Furmanovo, Bagrationovsky District =

Former settlement in Kaliningrad Oblast

Furmanovo Фурманово
- Rural locality
- Interactive map of Furmanovo
- Location of Furmanovo Furmanovo (European Russia) Furmanovo (Russia)
- Coordinates: 54°23′18″N 20°33′4″E
- Country: Russia
- Federal subject: Kaliningrad Oblast
- Administrative district: Bagrationovsky District
- Postal code: 238430

Furmanovo (Russian: Фурманово; Polish: Deksnie Małe, Sławity and Wądyty) is a former village in Bagrationovsky District of Kaliningrad Oblast, Russia, near the border with Poland.

Initially following World War II, in 1945, the villages passed to Poland as Deksnie Małe, Sławity and Wądyty and were part of the Iławka County in the Masurian District, however, the villages were eventually annexed by the Soviet Union and merged under the new name Furmanovo.
