= Bogatovo, Bagrationovsky District =

Bogatovo Богатово
- Rural locality
- Interactive map of Bogatovo
- Location of Bogatovo Bogatovo (European Russia) Bogatovo (Russia)
- Coordinates: 54°24′10″N 20°26′10″E
- Country: Russia
- Federal subject: Kaliningrad Oblast
- Administrative district: Bagrationovsky District

Population
  - Estimate (2010): 16 )
- Time zone: UTC+2 (MSK–1)
- Postal code: 238430
- OKTMO ID: 27703000266

Bogatovo (Russian: Богатово; Polish: Rosity and Burniny) is a rural settlement in Bagrationovsky District of Kaliningrad Oblast, Russia, close to the border with Poland.

Initially following World War II, in 1945, the villages passed to Poland as Rosity and Burniny and were part of the Iławka County in the Masurian District, however, the villages were eventually annexed by the Soviet Union and merged under the new name Bogatovo.
