= Rakitnoye, Bagrationovsky District =

Former settlement in Kaliningrad Oblast

Rakitnoye Ракитное
- Rural locality
- Interactive map of Rakitnoye
- Location of Rakitnoye Rakitnoye (European Russia) Rakitnoye (Russia)
- Coordinates: 54°23′26″N 20°44′50″E
- Country: Russia
- Federal subject: Kaliningrad Oblast
- Administrative district: Bagrationovsky District

Rakitnoye (Russian: Ракитное; German: Rappeln; Polish: Ropele) is an abandoned village in Bagrationovsky District of Kaliningrad Oblast, Russia, near the border with Poland.

Initially following World War II, in 1945, the village passed to Poland as Ropele and was part of the Iławka County in the Masurian District, however, it was eventually annexed by the Soviet Union and renamed to Rakitnoye.
