= Maloye Ozyornoye =

Settlement in Kaliningrad Oblast

Maloye Ozyornoye Малое Озёрное
- Rural locality
- Interactive map of Maloye Ozyornoye
- Location of Maloye Ozyornoye Maloye Ozyornoye (European Russia) Maloye Ozyornoye (Russia)
- Coordinates: 54°23′51″N 20°40′15″E
- Country: Russia
- Federal subject: Kaliningrad Oblast
- Administrative district: Bagrationovsky District

Population
  - Estimate (2010): 47 )
- Time zone: UTC+2 (MSK–1)
- Postal codes: 238421, 238431
- OKTMO ID: 27703000156

Maloye Ozyornoye (Russian: Малое Озёрное; German: Auklappen; Polish: Aukłapie) is a village in Bagrationovsky District of Kaliningrad Oblast, Russia, near the border with Poland.

Initially following World War II, in 1945, the village passed to Poland as Aukłapie and was part of the Iławka County in the Masurian District, however, it was eventually annexed by the Soviet Union and renamed to Maloye Ozyornoye.

== Demographics ==
Distribution of the population by ethnicity according to the 2021 census:

	percent
Russians	37.50%
no data	62.50%
