= Emmanuel Mgaya =

Tanzanian comedian (born 1985)

Masanja Mkandamizaji
- Born: Emmanuel Mgaya; 25 December 1985 (age 40); Ubaruku, Tanzania
- Notable work: Ze Komedi Show EATV; Orijino Komedi Show TBC1; Kina Vengu Azam TV
- Spouse: Monica Mgaya (2016)
- Children: 4

Comedy career
- Subjects: Performing arts, Entertainer, Pastor
- Website: www.emmanuelmgaya.com

Emmanuel "Masanja Mkandamizaji" Mgaya is a Tanzanian comedian who co-hosts the comedy TV show Orijino Komedi on TBC1 Tanzania with five other Tanzanian comedians (Joti, Mpoki, Wakuvanga, MC Reagan, and Vengu). Emmanuel was born in Ubaruku village, but has since moved to Dar es Salaam. He has worked in the comedy industry since 2005 and is now considered a household name in Tanzania.

Emmanuel is estimated to be worth more than $3m with investments in entertainment, fast food restaurants and commercial agriculture.

He is one of the top 10 most influential Tanzanians on social media, and one of the first Tanzanians to get a million followers on Instagram.

Apart from being a performing artist, Emmanuel is also a pastor and owns a fast growing church known as "Mito ya Baraka" – Swahili for "Rivers of Blessings" – in Tanzania's capital, Dar es Salaam. Emmanuel has performed on four continents: his native Africa, North America, Asia, and Europe. In 2015 Emmanuel Mgaya participated in election preliminaries for Ludewa Province MP within CCM but his bid was not successful.
