= Mawindi =

Ward of Mbeya Region, Tanzania

- Ward
- Location within Tanzania
- Coordinates: 8°41′S 34°30′E
- Country: Tanzania
- Region: Mbeya Region
- District: Mbarali District
- Ward: Mawindi

Government
  - Type: Council

Population (2016)
  - Total: 10,930
- Time zone: EAT
- Postcode: 53604
- Area code: 025
- Website: District Website

Mawindi is an administrative ward in the Mbarali district of the Mbeya Region of Tanzania. In 2016 the Tanzania National Bureau of Statistics report there were 10,930 people in the ward, from 9,917 in 2012.

== Villages and hamlets ==
The ward has 5 villages, and 34 hamlets.

- Itipingi
  - Itipindi 'A'
  - Itipindi 'B'
  - Mahango
  - Majengo 'A'
  - Majengo 'B'
  - Mjoja
  - Nyamatwiga
- Kangaga
  - Angola
  - Bimbi
  - Chang'ombe
  - Imalaya
  - Majombe
  - Mji mwema
  - Mkondo
  - Nyamahelela
  - Tambukaleli
  - Uswahilini
- Manienga
  - Chabegenja
  - Darajani
  - Kanisani
  - Mabambila
  - Mabanda 'A'
  - Mabanda 'B'
  - Makondo 'A'
  - Makondo 'B'
- Mkandami
  - Mkandami 'A'
  - Mkandami 'B'
  - Nyakasima
  - Nyalundung'u
- Isunura
  - Kati
  - Lupululu
  - Luvalande
  - Nyangasada
  - Uzunguni
