= Iławka County =

Former administrative unit in Poland

Iławka County powiat iławecki
- County of Poland
- 1945–1958
- Capital: Iławka (1945); Górowo Iławeckie
- Government
- Starost
  - 1945–1946: Paweł Gagatko
- History
  - Established: 1945
  - Disestablished: 31 December 1958
- Today part of: Poland; Russia

Iławka County (Polish: powiat iławecki) was a unit of territorial administration (powiat) in Poland, that existed from 1945 to 1958. It was initially part of the Masurian District from 1945 to 1946, and then the Olsztyn Voivodeship from 1946 to 1958. The capitals were Iławka (in 1945) and then Górowo Iławeckie.

The county was named after its county seat Iławka. In December 1945, Polish officials were expelled from Iławka and the town was unilaterally annexed by the Soviet Union and then renamed to Bagrationovsk, with the new Polish-Soviet border set just at the southern outskirts of the town. The county seat was then moved to Górowo Iławeckie, however it retained the name of Iławka County until 1958. On 1 January 1959, it was renamed to Górowo County.

== Soviet-annexed settlements ==
The following is a list of settlements of Iławka County that were eventually annexed by the USSR:

=== Towns ===
- Iławka

=== Villages ===
- Aukłapie
- Bocianek
- Burniny
- Deksnie Małe
- Deksnie Wielkie
- Dębowina
- Drąsyty
- Gierki
- Gierławki
- Grędzina
- Klusy
- Kucyty
- Łapaszki
- Łosie
- Miejska Wola
- Miliki
- Nojki
- Orzesze
- Pałpasy
- Piłsedy
- Rodyty
- Ropele
- Rosity
- Sierpały
- Skierwity
- Skłodyty
- Sławity
- Stary Dwór
- Strobajny
- Tapilkajmy
- Tęknity
- Trzciniec
- Wakarowo
- Wądyty
