= Serengeti International Hospital =

Coordinates: 01°49′49″S 34°40′33″E

- Government of Tanzania

Geography
- Location: Serengeti District, Mara Region, Tanzania

Organisation
- Care system: Public
- Type: International

Services
- Emergency department: I

History
- Opened: 2018 (expected)

Links
- Other links: Hospitals in Tanzania

Serengeti International Hospital, also Serengeti Hospital, is a public community hospital, under construction, in Serengeti District, Mara Region, in Tanzania. The hospital is intended to serve the needs of both the local population and the tourists visiting the nearby Serengeti National Park.

== Location ==
The hospital is located in northeastern Tanzania, in Serengeti District, Mara Region, adjacent to Serengeti National Park. This is approximately 125 kilometres (78 mi), by road, east of Musoma, the nearest large city. This is about 660 kilometres (410 mi), by road, northwest of Tabora, the capital city of Tanzania.

== Overview ==
The hospital is being built in phases. The first phase, planned to cost US$1.5 million, consists the outpatient department, and is expected to be complete by December 2017, with anticipated opening in January 2018.

The hospital is expected to cater to the Tanzanian citizens resident in 78 villages within Serengeti District and to the almost 400,000 tourists who visit the adjacent Serengeti National Park every year. The construction is funded by the government of Tanzania with contribution from the Tanzania National Parks.

== See also ==
- List of hospitals in Tanzania
