= Robert Kudicke =

German physician

Heinrich Robert Hellmuth Kudicke (born 12 December 1876 in Preußisch Eylau, Province of Prussia, died 8 May 1961) was a German physician, epidemiologist and one of the leading experts on tropical diseases in his lifetime. He worked in German East Africa and China for several years. A long-time collaborator of Nobel laureate Robert Koch, he is especially known for his work with African trypanosomiasis or sleeping sickness in the early 20th century. As director of the State Institute of Hygiene in German occupied Warsaw in 1941, he tested a new Typhus vaccine on Jewish residents of the Warsaw Ghetto, with ensuing adverse effects and deaths. During the early Cold War era, he worked in several developing countries in connection with medical development aid programmes.

== Career ==
He completed his medical studies at the Kaiser-Wilhelms-Akademie für das militärärztliche Bildungswesen and joined the medical service of the Royal Prussian Army as an officer in 1900. He worked as a military doctor in the colonial administration in German East Africa from 1902, and became director of the laboratory of the governmental hospital in Dar es Salaam from 1911. Kudicke was one of Nobel laureate Robert Koch's long-time collaborators and last surviving students, and participated in Koch's sleeping sickness expedition in German East Africa from 1906. He worked with sleeping sickness in the Lake Victoria area during the years 1907–1908 and 1910–1912, and later as director of the Institute for Sleeping Sickness in East Africa from 1913.

During the First World War, he served as a medical officer. In 1921 he joined the Georg Speyer House, a medical foundation in Frankfurt, and later worked at the Institute for Tropical Medicine in Hamburg from 1925–1927. Subsequently, he was Professor of Bacteriology and dean of the medical faculty of the Sun Yat-sen University in Canton in the Republic of China from 1927 to 1933. He later worked again in Frankfurt and after the occupation of Poland by the German Army as director of the State Institute of Hygiene in Warsaw. The former director Ludwik Hirszfeld was dismissed as a "non-Aryan" from the Institute and forced to move into the Warsaw Ghetto. During November and December 1941, Kudicke tested a new Typhus vaccine on 228 Jews of the Warsaw Ghetto; 24 of them developed severe adverse effects and died later on.

After the World War II, he was Professor of Epidemiology at the Goethe University Frankfurt from 1945, and then Professor Emeritus until his death. He was also acting director of the Institute for Medical Microbiology and Infection Control from October 1945 to October 1946, when he was succeeded by Hans Schlossberger.

From the late 1940s onwards, he also worked in several developing countries in connection with medical development aid programmes of the West German government.
