= Bugando Medical Centre =

- Episcopal Conference of the Catholic Bishops of Tanzania & Tanzania Ministry of Health and Social Welfare

Geography
- Location: Mwanza, Mwanza Region, Tanzania
- Coordinates: 02°31′41″S 32°54′27″E

Organisation
- Care system: Public
- Type: Tertiary, Referral, Teaching and Research
- Affiliated university: Catholic University of Health and Allied Sciences

Services
- Beds: 950+

History
- Founded: 3 November 1971; 54 years ago

Links
- Website: Homepage
- Other links: List of hospitals in Tanzania

Bugando Medical Centre (BMC) is a tertiary care medical facility owned by the Episcopal Conference of the Catholic Bishops of Tanzania. The hospital is operated in collaboration with the Tanzania Ministry of Health and Social Welfare.

== Location ==
The facility is located in the city of Mwanza, in Mwanza Region, along the southern shores of Lake Victoria. This is approximately 1,114 kilometres (692 mi), by road, north-west of Dar es Salaam, the financial capital and largest city in the country. The geographical coordinates of the hospital are: 2°31'41.0"S, 32°54'27.0"E (Latitude:-2.528056; Longitude:32.907500).

== Overview ==
BMC is a tertiary referral, research, teaching center and cancer treatment hospital affiliated with the Catholic University of Health and Allied Sciences. BMC's inpatient bed capacity is 950, spanning a wide range of medical and surgical specialties. The hospital employs over 1,300 staff.

== Bugando Cancer Centre ==
In Tanzania, an estimated 35,000 new cases of cancer were diagnosed in 2014, of whom about 21,000 (60 percent) died that same year. The country has only two cancer hospitals, the main one, Ocean Road Cancer Institute, is located in the financial capital, Dar es Salaam. The cancer unit at Bugando Medical Centre is the second and only other public cancer treatment centre to cater for the estimated 58 million Tanzania's citizens. In February 2021 a total of TSh1.34 billion (approx. US$580,000) was raised at the hospital as part of funding to expand and modernize the facility. When completed the Bugando Cancer Centre, will have capacity to attend to 120 patients on a daily basis.

== History ==
This hospital was built by the Catholic Church between 1968 and 1977. It was officially opened on 3 November 1971, by Tanzania's founding president, Julius Nyerere. In 1972 the Hospital was nationalized by the Government. However, 13 years later, it was handed back to the Catholic Church in Tanzania, with the understanding that the hospital be run as a regional referral hospital for the Lake Zone, spanning 8 of Tanzania's 31 regions (total population 14 million in 2017), with the collaboration of the Government of Tanzania.

== Services ==
As of 2017, BMC offered specialist services in the following clinical areas:

- Ophthalmology
- Ear, Nose and Throat
- Urology
- General Surgery
- Neurosurgery
- Plastic Surgery
- Dental and Maxillofacial Surgery
- Orthopedic Surgery
- Cardiothoracic Surgery
- Obstetrics and Gynaecology
- Pediatric and Child Health
- Cardiology
- Gastroentology
- Nephrology
- Endocrinology
- Infectious Diseases (including HIV/AIDS and Tuberculosis)
- Dermatology
- Internal Medicine
- Emergency Medicine
- Anesthesiology and Critical Care
- Pain Management
- General Paediatrics
- Psychiatry
- Oncology (Cancer Care)
- Nuclear Medicine
- Radiotherapy.

== See also ==
- List of hospitals in Tanzania
