= St. Walburg's Hospital =

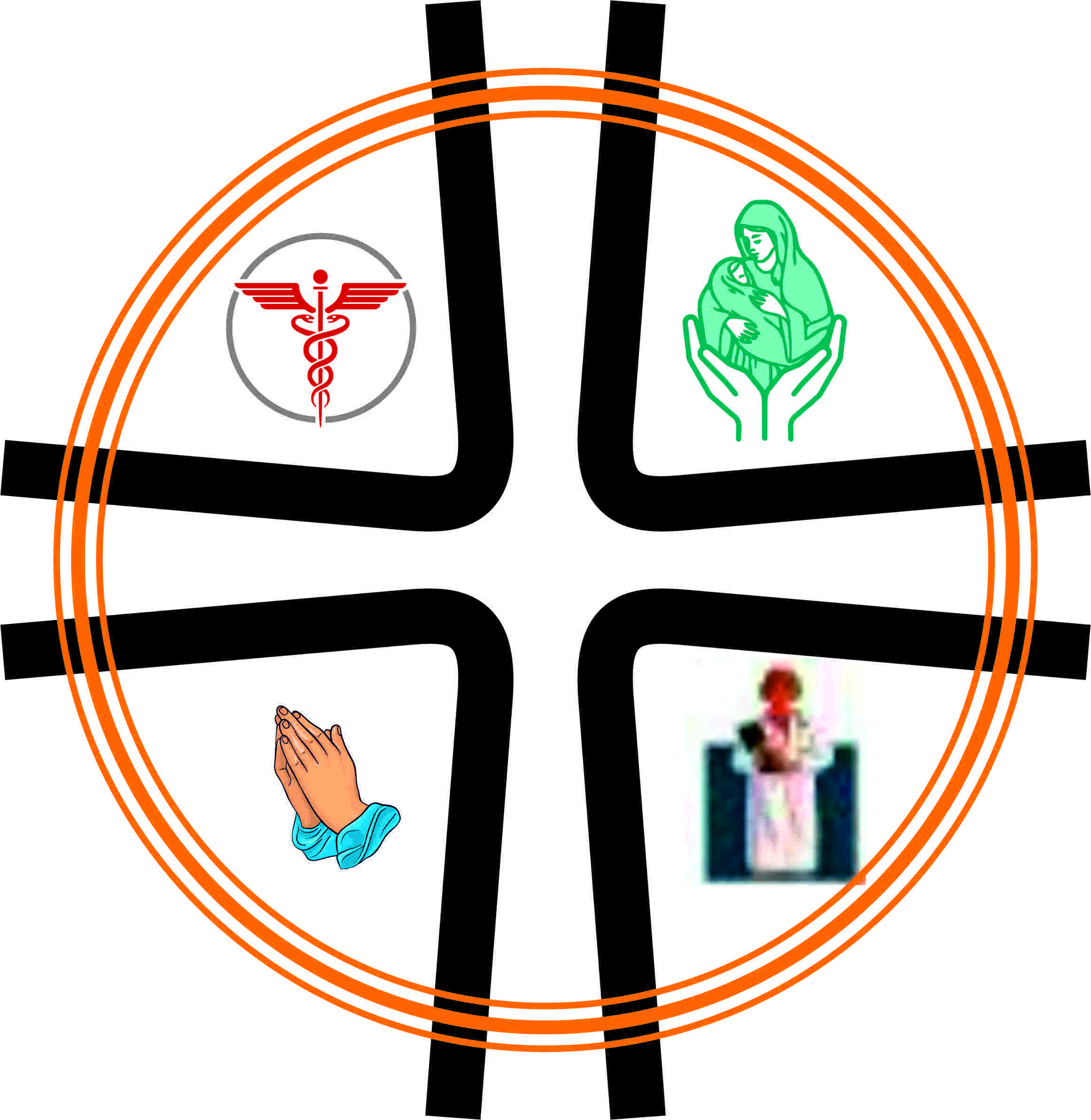

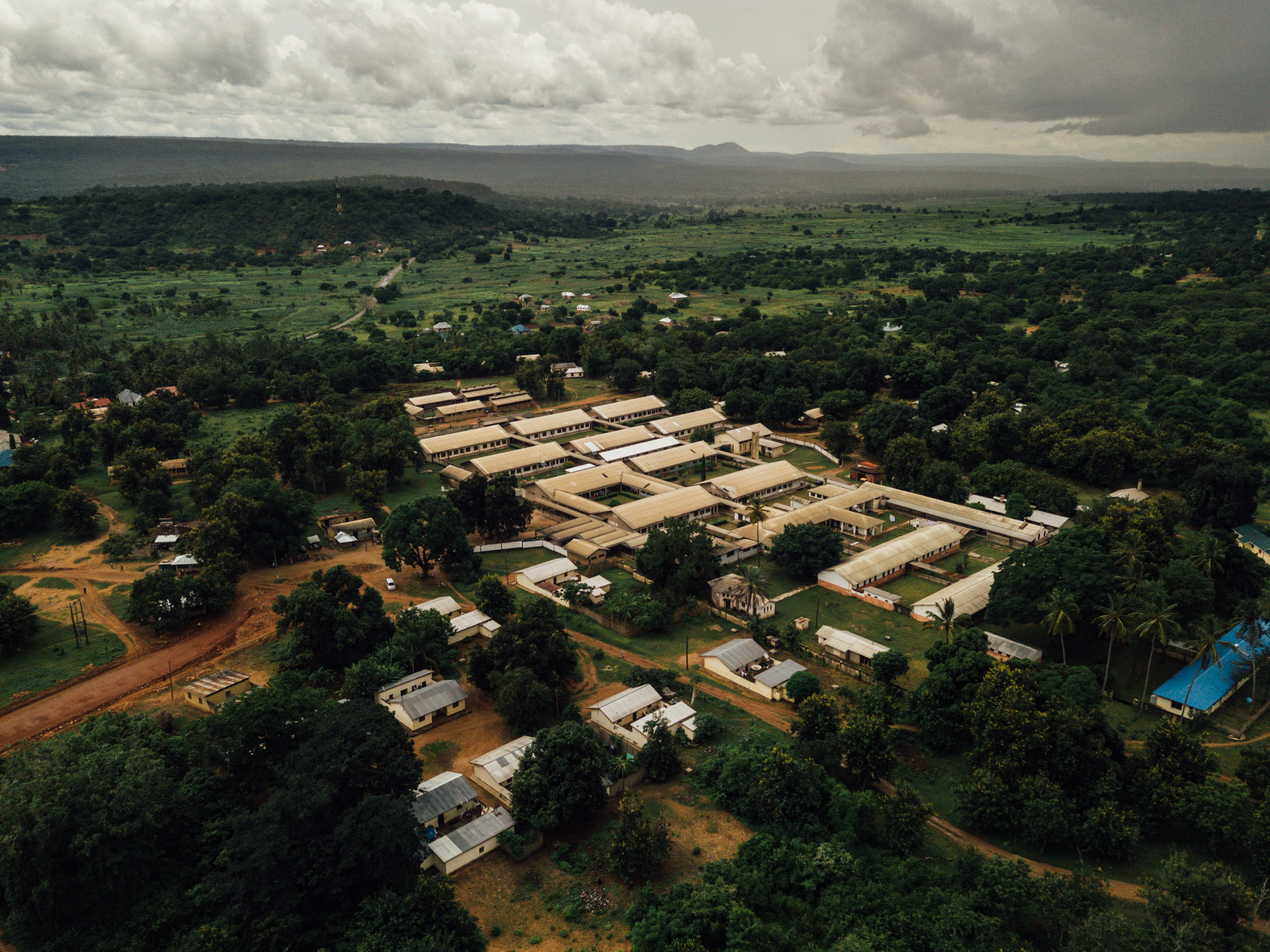

Geography
- Location: Nyangao, Lindi District, Lindi Region, Tanzania
- Coordinates: 10.331070°S 39.297087°E

Organisation
- Type: District
- Religious affiliation: Christian

Services
- Beds: 220

History
- Opened: 1959

Links
- Website: nyangaohospital.or.tz
- Lists: Hospitals in Tanzania

The St. Walburg's Hospital is a Faith Based (FBH)/Council Designated Hospital (CDH) situated in Nyangao, Lindi Region. The hospital is owned by the Roman Catholic Diocese of Lindi. The hospital has a 220 approved beds capacity and it has been supported by the Missionary Benedictine Sisters of Tutzing and the Government of Tanzania.

== History ==
Named after the Anglo-Saxon missionary, Saint Walburga, the hospital was built in 1959 by Sister Doctor Tekla Stinnesbeck at the site of a dispensary that had been running for 12 years. In 1982 Sister Doctor Raphaela Haendler oversaw the rehabilitation and expansion of the hospital to 150 beds. As of 1996, the hospital houses 220 in-patient beds.

== Catchment area and population ==
St. Walburg's Hospital Nyangao is situated on the hills of Nyangao Village, north to the border between the Lindi and Mtwara Regions. Lindi region is surrounded by six districts and all combined these have an estimated total of more than 900,000 inhabitants (2012 census). Operations cover the east-southern zone of Tanzania between Kilwa and the border of Mozambique. The hospital even receives patients from neighbour country of Mozambique. Nyangao hospital is estimated to serve a population of around two million people.

== Facilities ==
The hospital admits patients to a general medical ward, which has separate units for patients with Tuberculosis, a surgical ward, a paediatric ward, an Obstetrics and gynaecology ward and a Neonate Intensive Care Unit. The hospital also operates an HIV/AIDS treatment clinic, a Physiotherapy department, a dental clinic and an eye clinic. The hospital is running a Out Patient Department and a department for Reproductive health and Child Health. It is supported by a laboratory, two pharmacies and X-ray and Ultrasound services.
