= Mbarali District =

District of Mbeya Region, Tanzania

Mbarali
- District
- Mbarali District of Mbeya Region
- Coordinates: 08°04′S 34°38′E
- Country: Tanzania
- Region: Mbeya Region
- District: Mbarali District
- Headquarters: Rujewa

Government
  - Type: Council
  - Chairman: Twalib Tamimu Lubandamo
  - Director: Missana Kalela Kwangura

Area
  - Total: 14,438 km^{2} (5,575 sq mi)

Population (2022)
  - Total: 446,336
  - Density: 30.914/km^{2} (80.067/sq mi)
  - Religion: Christianity
- Time zone: EAT
- Postcode: 536xx
- Area code: 025
- Website: District Website

Mbarali District is one of the five districts of Mbeya Region, Tanzania. It is bordered to the north by Iringa region and east by Njombe region. To the south the district is bordered by Mbeya District and to the west by Chunya District.

In 2016 the Tanzania National Bureau of Statistics report there were 331,206 people in the district, from 300,517 in 2012.

Mbarali district is the most famous area for rice farming. The district is home to Kapunga rice project and Mbarali estate. The district hosts a very famous wetland called Ihefu, as well as the Usangu plain. Ruaha National Park is within the district to the north side.

== Wards ==
The Mbarali District is administratively divided into 20 wards:

- Chimala
- Itamboleo
- Igava
- Imalilo Songwe
- Ihahi
- Lugelele
- Igurusi
- Madibira
- Mahongole
- Mapogoro
- Mawindi
- Luhanga
- Kongolo
- Mwatenga
- Miyombweni
- Ipwani
- Ruiwa
- Rujewa
- Ubaruku
- Utengule/Usangu

== Education and transportation ==
In the case of education, Mbarali district has several public and private schools in both primary and secondary levels. The famous schools like St Ann's and Montfort are within the district. Also an advanced level secondary school called Madibira high school is within the district. TANZAM-HIGHWAY passes in the southern part of the district. The road links the towns of Rujewa, Chimala and Igurusi with the cities of Dar es Salaam and Mbeya as well as the neighbouring countries like Malawi and Zambia. A railway line called TAZARA which connects the two countries Tanzania and Zambia, runs in the district.
