= Temeke Regional Referral Hospital =

Geography
- Location: Dar es Salaam, Tanzania

Organisation
- Type: District

Services
- Beds: 304

Links
- Lists: Hospitals in Tanzania

The Temeke Regional Referral Hospital is a 304 bed hospital in Dar es Salaam, Tanzania servicing the Temeke District.
