= Berega Mission Hospital =

Hospital in Berega, Morogoro, Tanzania

Berega Mission HospitalBerega Mission Hospital

Geography
- Location: Berega, Morogoro region, Tanzania
- Coordinates: 6.180171°S 37.145891°E

Organisation
- Type: General

Services
- Beds: 120

Links
- Lists: Hospitals in Tanzania

Berega Mission Hospital is a 120-bed hospital situated in Berega, Morogoro region, central Tanzania, administered by the Anglican Church of Tanzania. The hospital, plus attached nursing school, serves an estimated 217,000 of the poorest residents of Tanzania and the hospital's current operation is reliant on charitable donations and volunteer work. Despite a high volume of critically unwell patients, many of them children, and its status as a referral centre for nearby community medical centres (most frequently dispensaries), Berega operates in a very low-resource environment.

== Location ==
The hospital is located in the centre of Berega. It is a 20 minute drive from Dodoma Road, the main highway from Dar Es Salaam to Dodoma. There is a nearby airstrip.

== Facilities ==
There are four wards: Paediatric, Male, Female, Maternity, as well as a Neonatal Care Unit (opened in 2016). There are three operating theatres, a pharmacy and outpatient facilities. Additionally, there is accommodation for relatives and expectant mothers. The School of Nursing at Berega (SONAB) provides approximately sixty nursing students who assist in the hospital during their studies. The hospital gets electricity from the main power grid, but power cuts are frequent. There is a generator, but it is expensive to run and avoided for as long as possible. Water is pumped from a nearby well twice per week.

== Press coverage ==
Berega was featured in a three-part article in The New York Times, focusing on the challenges of high maternal mortality in East Africa.
