= Miyombweni =

Ward in Mbarali, Mbeya, Tanzania

Miyombweni Kata ya Miyombweni
- Ward
- Location within Tanzania
- Coordinates: 8.334°S 34.708°E
- Country: Tanzania
- Region: Mbeya Region
- District: Mbarali District
- Ward: Miyombweni

Population (2016)
  - Total: 10,771
- Time zone: UTC+3 (EAT)
- Postcode: 53614

Miyombweni is an administrative ward in the Mbarali District of the Mbeya Region of Tanzania. In 2016 the Tanzania National Bureau of Statistics report there were 10,771 people in the ward, from 9,773 in 2012.

== Villages and hamlets ==
The ward has 5 villages, and 19 hamlets.

- Magigiwe
  - Magigiwe 'A'
  - Magigiwe 'B'
  - Mkindi 'A'
  - Mkindi 'B'
  - Mnyelela
- Mapogoro
  - Igubike
  - Ikulu 'A'
  - Ikulu 'B'
  - Mapogoro 'A'
  - Mapogoro 'B'
- Mlungu
  - Masangala
  - Mawe saba
  - Mlungu
- Myombweni
  - Azimio
  - Kichangani
  - Mabatini
- Nyakazombe
  - Kinyangulu
  - Nyakazombe
  - Nyakazombe kati
