= Utengule Usangu =

Ward of Mbeya Region, Tanzania

Utengule Usangu Kata ya Utengule Usangu
- Ward
- Location within Tanzania
- Coordinates: 8.68937°S 33.88465°E
- Country: Tanzania
- Region: Mbeya Region
- District: Mbarali District
- Ward: Utengule Usangu

Population (2016)
  - Total: 16,980
- Time zone: UTC+3 (EAT)
- Postcode: 53607

Utengule Usangu is an administrative ward in the Mbarali District of the Mbeya Region of Tanzania. In 2016 the Tanzania National Bureau of Statistics report there were 16,980 people in the ward, from 15,407 in 2012.

== Villages and hamlets ==
The ward has 6 villages, and 37 hamlets.

- Mpolo
  - Ihanga 'A'
  - Ihanga 'B'
  - Ihanga 'C'
  - Mahango 'A'
  - Mahango 'B'
  - Mahango 'C'
- Muungano
  - Itambo Mpolo
  - Lyanumbusi
  - Senganinjala
  - Ugandilwa
- Mahango Mswiswi
  - Ijumbi
  - Kajunjumele
  - Majojolo
  - Marawatu
  - Misufini
  - Shuleni
- Magulula
  - Ilonjelo
  - Lena - Mtakuja
  - Mfinga
  - Muungano
  - Nengelesa
  - Ujora
- Simike
  - Mapula 'A'
  - Mapula 'B'
  - Mapululu
  - Miambeni
  - Mianzini
  - Shuleni
  - Tengatenga
  - Wambilo
- Utengule Usangu
  - Iduya A
  - Iduya B
  - Jemedari
  - Ubajulie - Mbela
  - Ujola
  - Ulyankha
  - Wimbwa
