= Bagrationovsk =

Town in Kaliningrad Oblast, Russia

Bagrationovsk Багратионовск
- Town
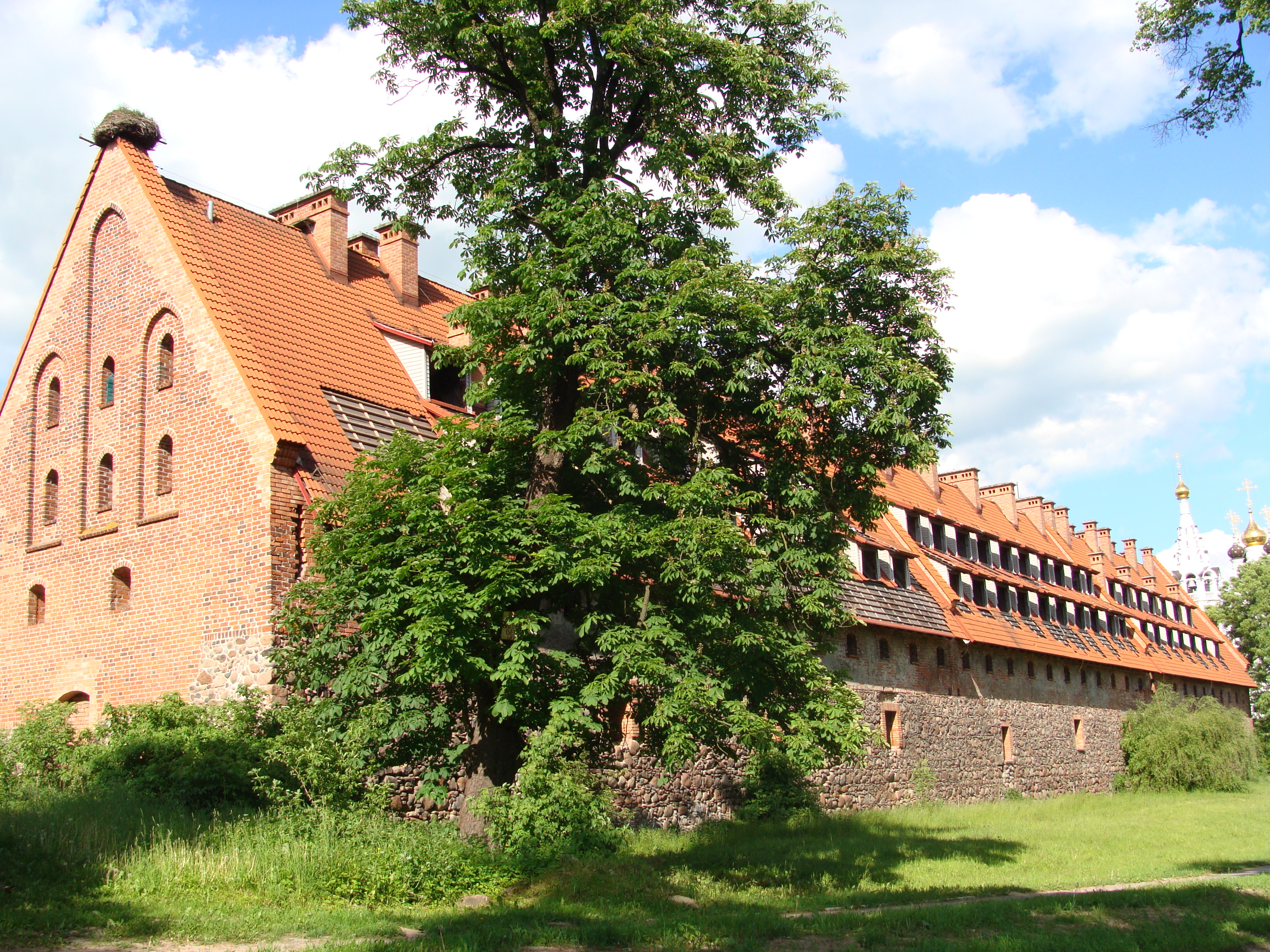
- Remains of the Teutonic Castle

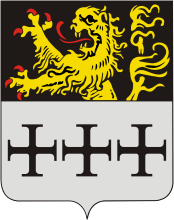
- Coat of arms
- Interactive map of Bagrationovsk
- Location of Bagrationovsk Bagrationovsk (European Russia) Bagrationovsk (Baltic Sea)
- Coordinates: 54°24′N 20°38′E
- Country: Russia
- Federal subject: Kaliningrad Oblast
- Administrative district: Bagrationovsky District
- Town of district significanceSelsoviet: Bagrationovsk
- Founded: 1325
- Town status since: 1585
- Elevation: 70 m (230 ft)

Population (2010 Census)
  - Total: 6,400
  - Estimate (2023): 6,379 (−0.3%)

Administrative status
  - Capital of: Bagrationovsky District, town of district significance of Bagrationovsk

Municipal status
  - Municipal district: Bagrationovsky Municipal District
  - Urban settlement: Bagrationovskoye Urban Settlement
  - Capital of: Bagrationovsky Municipal District, Bagrationovskoye Urban Settlement
- Time zone: UTC+2 (MSK–1)
- Postal code: 238420
- OKTMO ID: 27503000001
- Website: gorod-bagrat.ru

Bagrationovsk (Russian: Багратио́новск; German: Preußisch Eylau, lit. 'Prussian Eylau'; Polish: Pruska Iława or Iławka; Lithuanian: Ylava or Prūsų Ylava) is a town and the administrative center of Bagrationovsky District in Kaliningrad Oblast, Russia, located close to the border with Poland, 37 kilometers (23 mi) south of Kaliningrad, the administrative center of the oblast. It has a population of 6,400 (2010 census).

== History ==
=== Early history ===
Historical affiliations

Teutonic Order 1325–1454
Kingdom of Poland 1454–1455
Teutonic Order 1455–1525
Duchy of Prussia 1525–1701
Kingdom of Prussia 1701–1758
Russian Empire 1758–1762
Kingdom of Prussia 1762–1871
German Empire 1871–1918
Weimar Republic 1918–1933
Nazi Germany 1933–1945
Poland 1945
Soviet Union 1946–1991
Russian Federation 1991-present

In 1325, the Teutonic Knights built an Ordensburg castle called "Yladia" or "Ilaw", later known as "Preussisch Eylau", in the center of the Old Prussian region Natangia. 'Ylow' is the Old Prussian term for 'mud' or 'swamp'. The settlement nearby developed in 1336, but in 1348 the Teutonic Order gave the privilege to establish twelve pubs in the area around the castle. Although the settlement had only a few inhabitants, due to its central position it was often used as meeting place for officials of the Order.

In 1454, King Casimir IV Jagiellon incorporated the region to the Kingdom of Poland upon the request of the Prussian Confederation, which rebelled against the Teutonic Order. During the subsequent Thirteen Years' War, in 1455, Teutonic Knights regained control of the settlement. The castle was besieged on 24 May 1455 by troops of the Prussian Confederation under the command of Remschel von Krixen, but the garrison repulsed the attack. After the war, in 1466, the settlement became a fief of Poland held by the Teutonic Knights. During the Horsemen's War in 1520, the castle was unsuccessfully besieged by troops of the Polish Kingdom, who devastated the settlement. Following the war, it became part of the newly established secular Ducal Prussia. Preußisch Eylau received its civic charter in 1585.

=== 18th–19th centuries ===
In 1709–1711, the bubonic plague killed 2,212 inhabitants of the Eylau area. The town was under Russian occupation from 1758 to 1762 during the Seven Years' War.

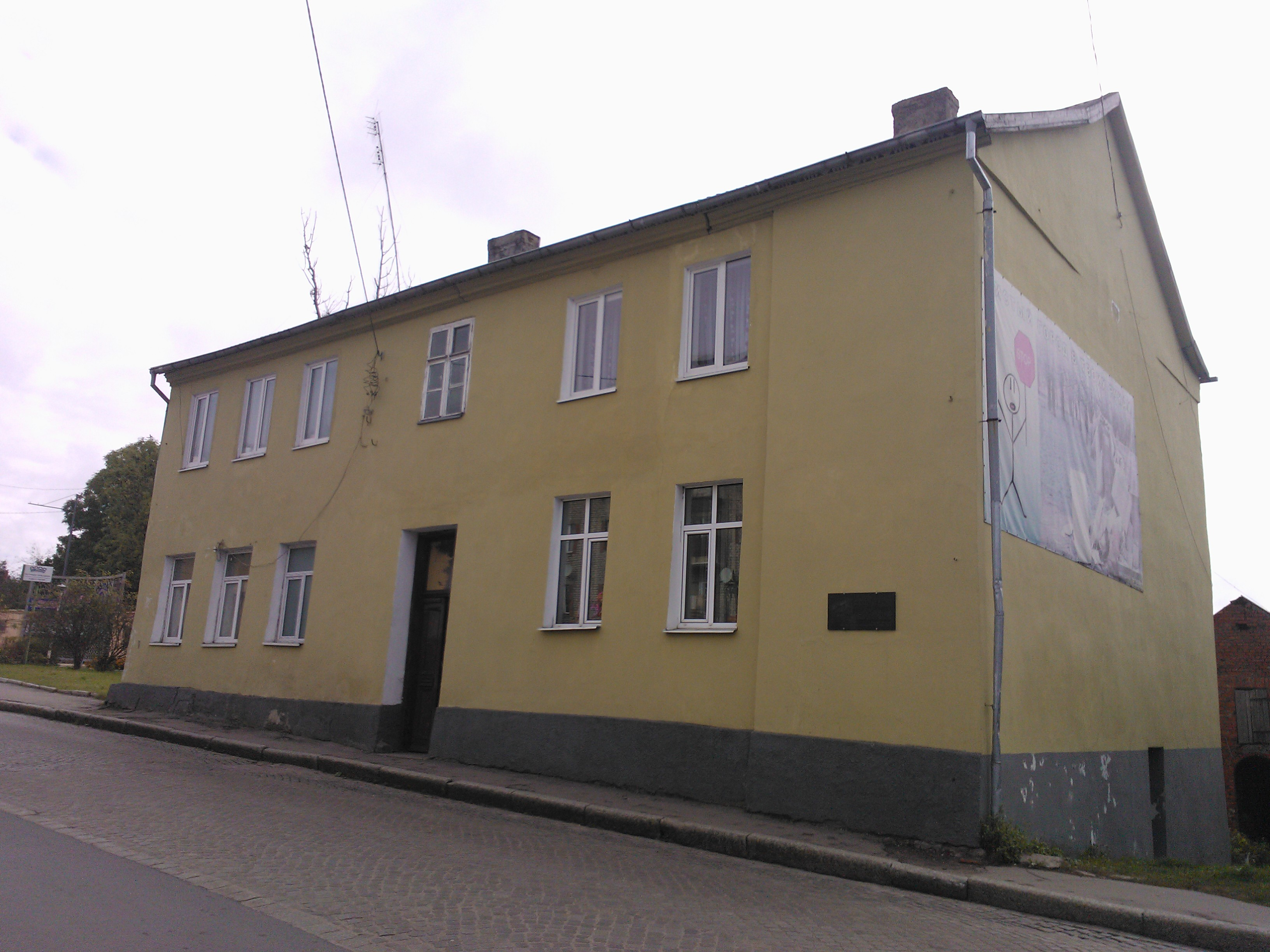
Place of stay of Napoleon after the 1807 battle

The Battle of Eylau (7–8 February 1807) during the Napoleonic Wars involved the French troops of Napoleon Bonaparte, the Russian troops of General Bennigsen, and the Prussian troops of General Anton Wilhelm von L'Estocq. Only 3 inhabitants of Eylau died in the battle, but 605 persons died due to hunger and diseases in 1807 (with the average death rate in "normal" years being around 80–90). Napoleon used the local courthouse as his headquarters in Eylau on 7–17 February 1807.

On 1 April 1819, the town became the seat of the administrative district Preußisch Eylau (Kreis Pr. Eylau). In 1834, a Teachers' Seminary was founded, educating every East Prussian teacher until it was closed down in 1924. The town was connected to the railway on 2 September 1866. In the late 19th century, four annual fairs and two weekly markets were held in the town.

=== 20th–21st centuries ===
During World War I, the town was occupied without a struggle by Russian troops on 27 August 1914, but these troops left on 3 September 1914.

After 1933, large barracks were built by the Wehrmacht, and in 1935 Infantry and Artillery units were stationed there.

On 10 February 1945, during the Soviet Red Army's East Prussian Offensive, the town was occupied by troops of the 55th Guards "Irkutsk-Pinsk" Division commanded by Major General Adam Turchinsky.

In June 1945, the town was handed over to Poland, and Polish officials took over the administrative power. Under the Polish name Iławka, the town became a county seat, but Poles left again in December 1945, as the new borderline between the Soviet Union and Poland was set just at the southern outskirts of the town. The county seat was then moved to Górowo Iławeckie (now a twin town of Bagrationovsk), however it retained the name of Iławka County until 1958.

In January 1946, the town became a part of the newly established Kaliningrad Oblast within the Russian SFSR and the town was given its present name, honoring General Pyotr Bagration, who was one of the senior Russian leaders in the Napoleonic Wars and is also the namesake of the 1944 Operation Bagration offensive. The German population that had not already fled during the evacuation of East Prussia during the war was subsequently expelled, with the last transport leaving on 23 November 1947. The NKVD established a prison camp for German civilians inside the former Wehrmacht barracks in 1945–1949. It held an estimated 13,000 inmates, of whom some 6,000 people died.

Today the main border crossing point between Russia and Poland (Bezledy/Bagrationovsk) is 2 kilometers (1.2 mi) south of the town. Since April 2007, government restrictions on visits to border areas have been tightened and travel to Sovetsk and Bagrationovsk is only allowed with special permission, unless in transit.

== Administrative and municipal status ==
Within the framework of administrative divisions, Bagrationovsk serves as the administrative center of Bagrationovsky District. As an administrative division, it is incorporated within Bagrationovsky District as the town of district significance of Bagrationovsk. As a municipal division, the town of district significance of Bagrationovsk is incorporated within Bagrationovsky Municipal District as Bagrationovskoye Urban Settlement.

== Population ==
Historical population

Year	Pop.	±%
1782	1,453	—
1804	1,816	+25.0%
1820	1,631	−10.2%
1846	2,630	+61.3%
1852	2,988	+13.6%
1871	3,719	+24.5%
1885	3,547	−4.6%
1890	3,446	−2.8%
1900	3,248	−5.7%
1910	3,270	+0.7%

Year	Pop.	±%
1925	3,787	+15.8%
1933	4,123	+8.9%
1939	7,485	+81.5%
1946	2,275	−69.6%
1968	4,300	+89.0%
1989	6,728	+56.5%
2002	7,216	+7.3%
2010	6,400	−11.3%
2018	6,482	+1.3%
2021	6,579	+1.5%

== Notable people ==
- Hugo Falkenheim (1856–1945), medical doctor and last Chairman of the Jewish parish of Königsberg
- Konrad Theodor Preuss (1869–1938), ethnologist
- Robert Kudicke (1876–1961), physician and epidemiologist specializing in tropical medicine, university lecturer in Guangdong and Frankfurt am Main

== Twin towns and sister cities ==
Bagrationovsk is twinned with:

- Verden an der Aller, Lower Saxony, Germany
- Górowo Iławeckie, Poland
- Bartoszyce, Poland
- Jonava, Lithuania

== Gallery ==
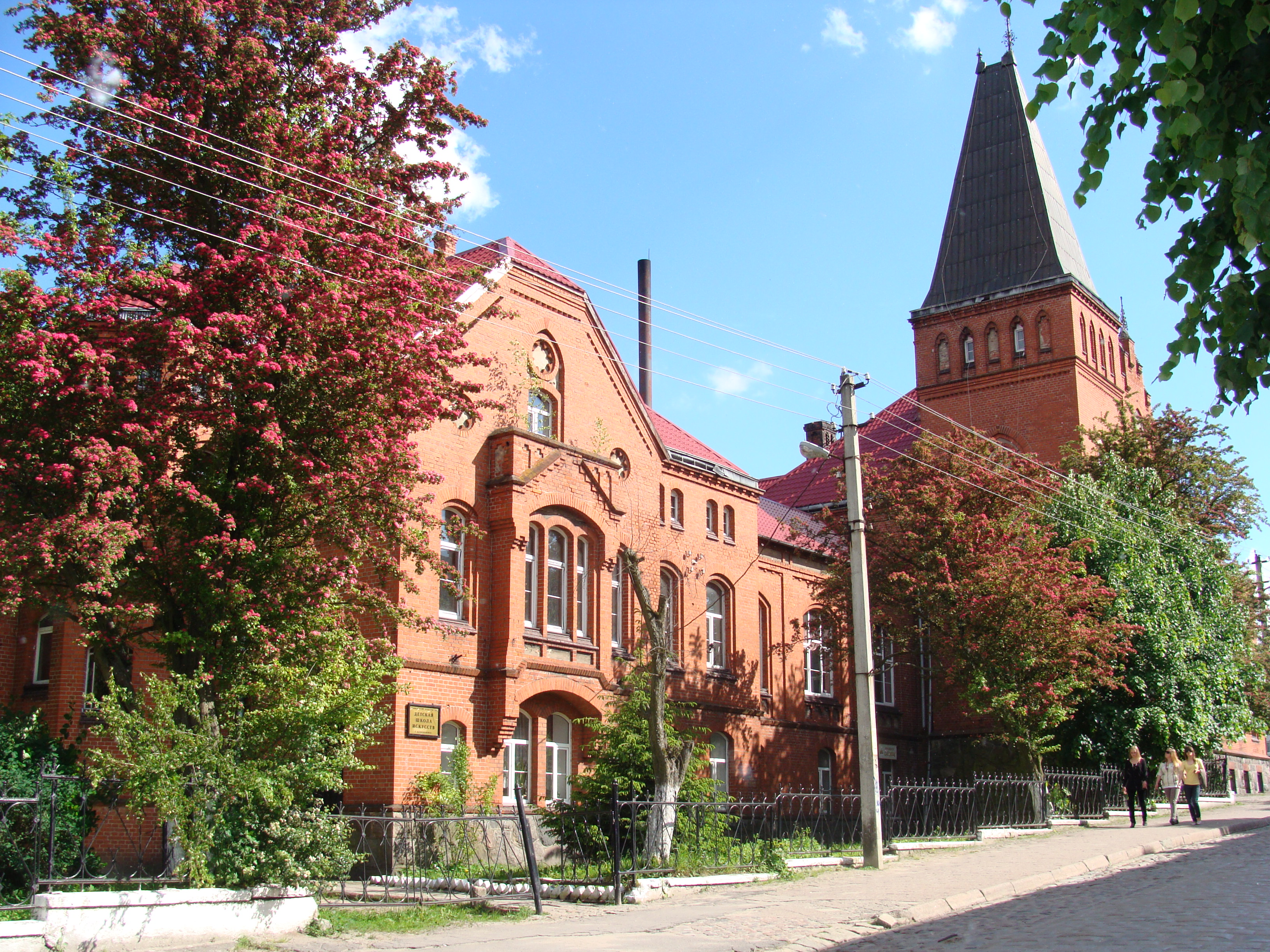
Art school

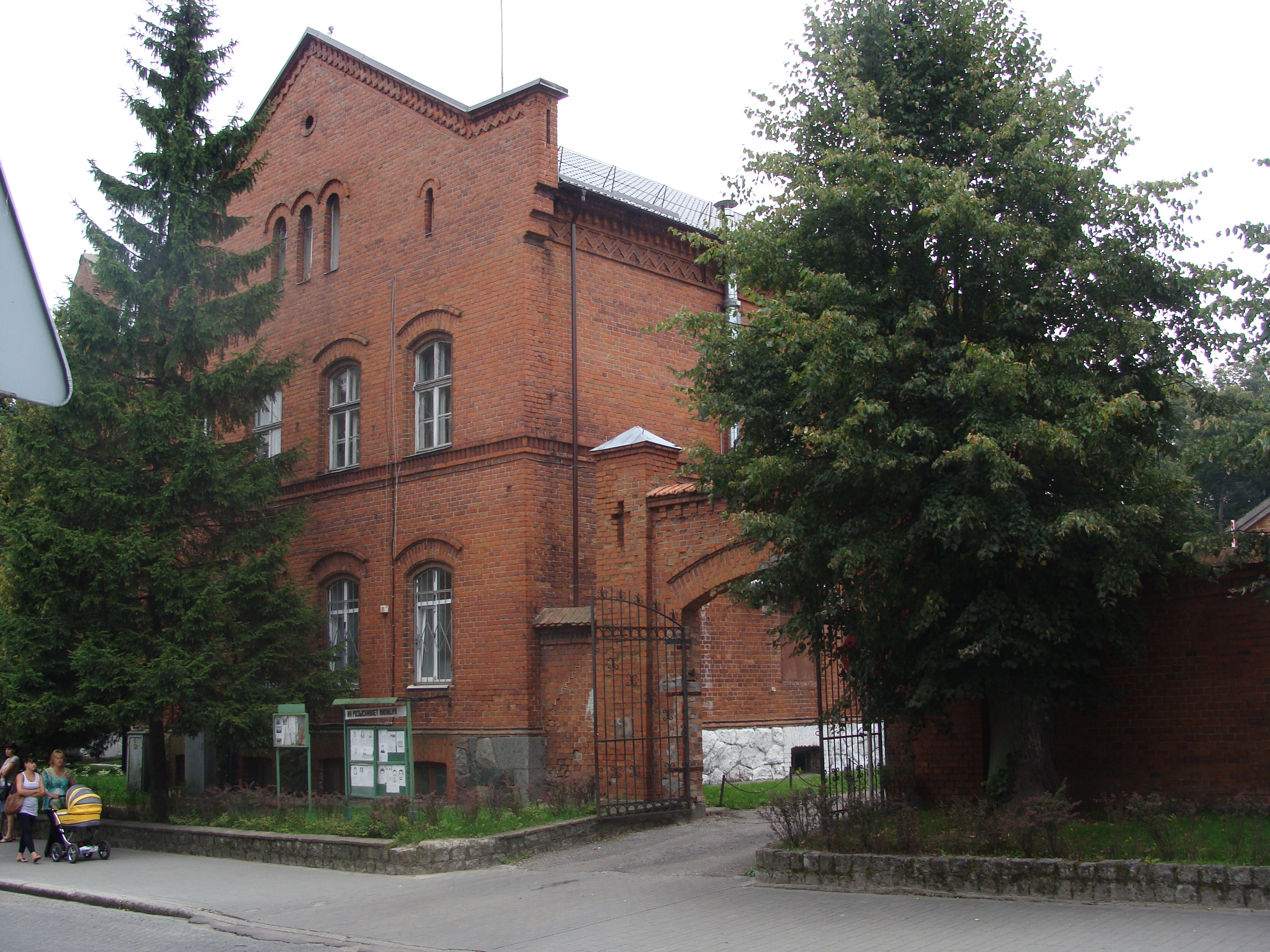
Municipal administration building

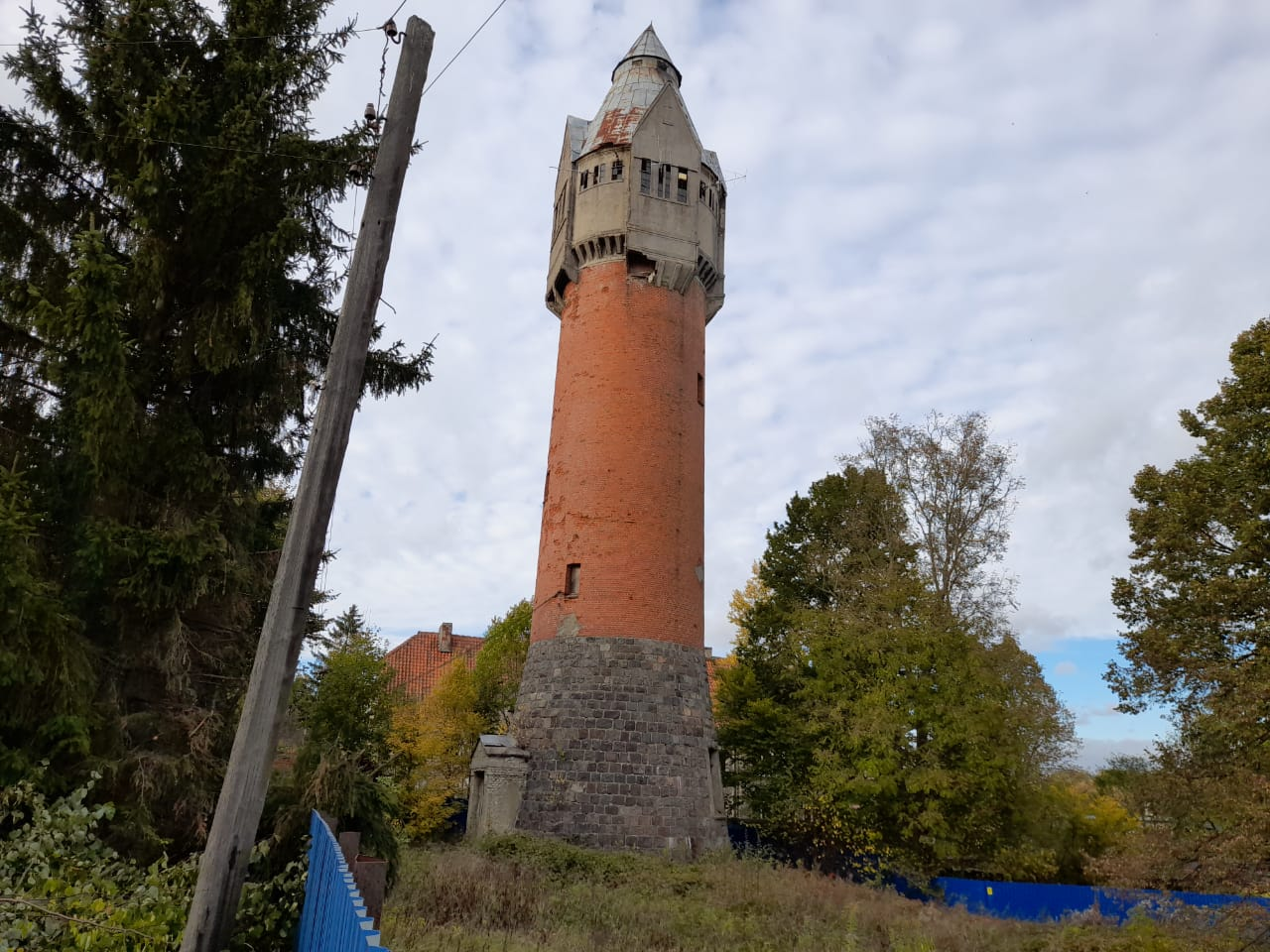
Water tower

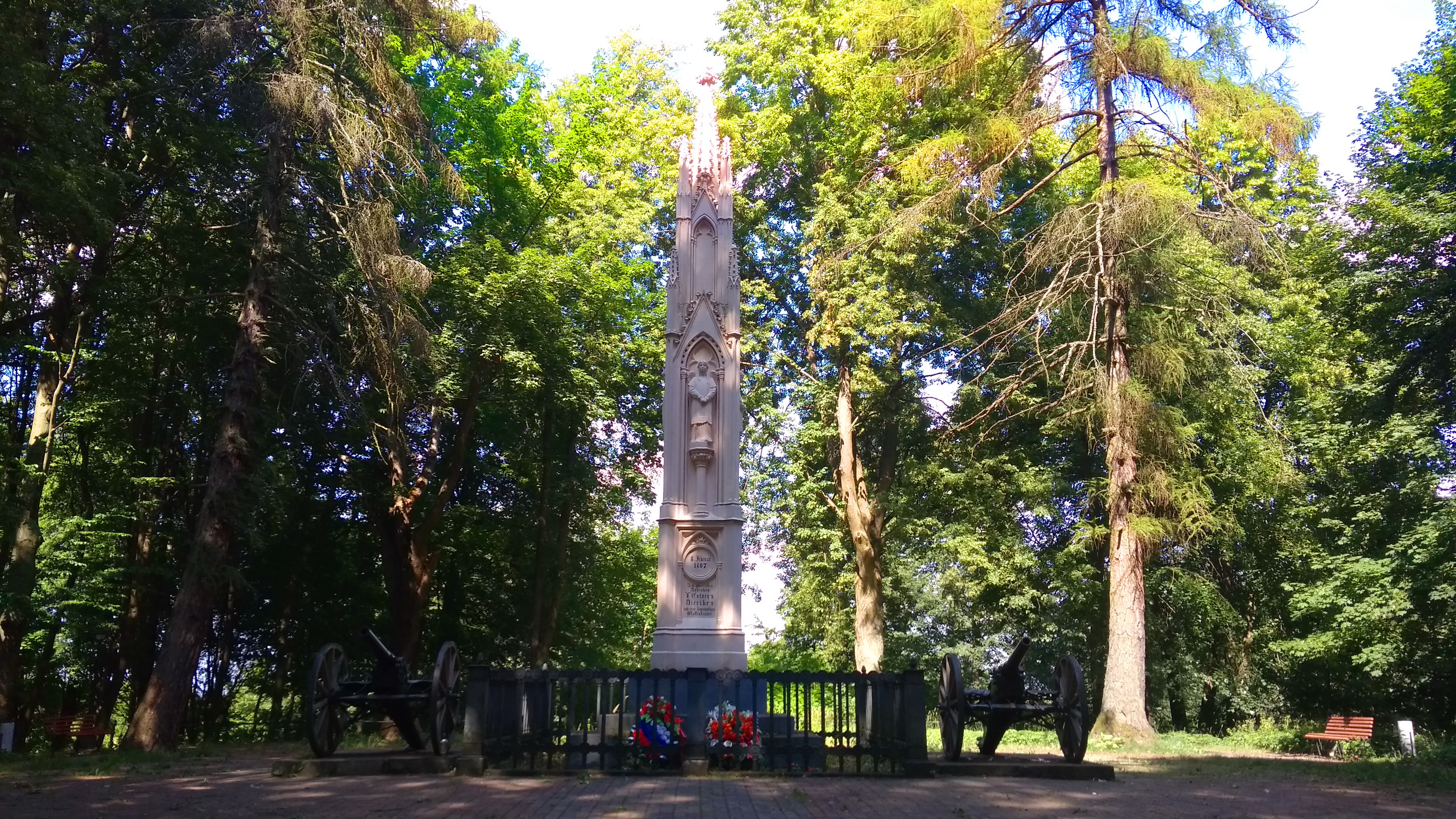
Battle of Eylau Monument
