= Kibong'oto Hospital =

Tanzania Infectious Diseases Institute
- Ministry of Health

Geography
- Location: Mae Street, Lamokaa Road Siha Kilimanjaro TZ, 25401, Tanzania, Kilimanjaro, Tanzania

Services
- Beds: 340

History
- Former name: Kibong'oto Infectious Diseases Institute
- Opened: 1926

Links
- Website: http://kidh.go.tz/
- Lists: Hospitals in Tanzania

Tanzania Infectious Diseases Institute (TIDI) Formerly Kibong'oto Infectious Disease Hospital (KIDH) is a national specialized institute located in Kilimanjaro Region, Tanzania. It serves as the country's infectious diseases instituteThe institute was officially established through Government Notice No. 216 of 2026. The institute provides specialized clinical services, research, training, and public health support in infectious diseases. It was officially established as the Tanzania Infectious Diseases Institute through Government Notice No. 216 of 2026, published in the Government Gazette on 24 July 2026. The hospital is headed by Dr. Leonard Subi as Executive Director.

The institute was founded by a British physician Dr. Normal Davies in 1926, initially as a tuberculosis sanitorium, then designated as the regional tuberculosis hospital for East Africa. Over many decades the institute has expanded its services and is now the leading centre for infectious disease care, research and innovation in the country. In 2022 the institute inaugurated its Biosafety Level 3 laboratory (Kibong'oto Public Health Laboratory) that has had a substantial impact on the hospitals ability to monitor and treat infectious diseases.
