= Mirembe National Mental Health Hospital =

Geography
- Location: Itega, Hazina Ward, Dodoma, Tanzania
- Coordinates: 6.181404°S 35.728857°E

Organisation
- Care system: Public
- Funding: Government hospital
- Type: Specialist
- Affiliated university: Aga Khan University Hospital, Nairobi and Aga Khan University Hospital, Karachi

Services
- Standards: ISO 9001: 2000
- Beds: 340
- Speciality: Psychiatric hospital

History
- Opened: 1927

Links
- Website: mnmh.or.tz
- Lists: Hospitals in Tanzania

Mirembe National Mental Health Hospital, formerly called Mirembe Hospital for the Insane, is the national psychiatric hospital in Dodoma, Tanzania. In 1927, the British colonial administration built the hospital, which handled mental patients from all over the Tanganyika Territory. The hospital has 340 beds and served 53,946 patients in 2020.

== History ==
Mirembe National Mental Health Hospital was founded in 1927 by the British administration in Tanganyika Territory to serve as the colony's main mental health hospital. It gained a good reputation for treatment throughout the colony to the extent that Mirambe became a byword for mental health treatment as Bethlem Royal Hospital had in the United Kingdom. It treated both black and white patients together during British rule.

The hospital mostly deals with acute mental health concerns whilst those deemed as criminally insane are treated at Insanga Mental Health Hospital. By 1962 after independence, the hospital had the only two government employed psychiatrists working at the hospital. In 2016, the hospital staff went on a two hour strike in protest at their working conditions and lack of response to staff requests. In 2018, the government of Tanzania announced they were investing 900 million Tanzanian shillings into renovating Mirembe Hospital in response to an increase in mental health cases in Tanzania. In 2025, the hospital partnered up with the Vanessa Amada Foundation to engage in community outreach activities to ensure that young people in Tanzania were aware that assistance for mental health concerns were available to them.
