= List of hospitals in Tanzania =

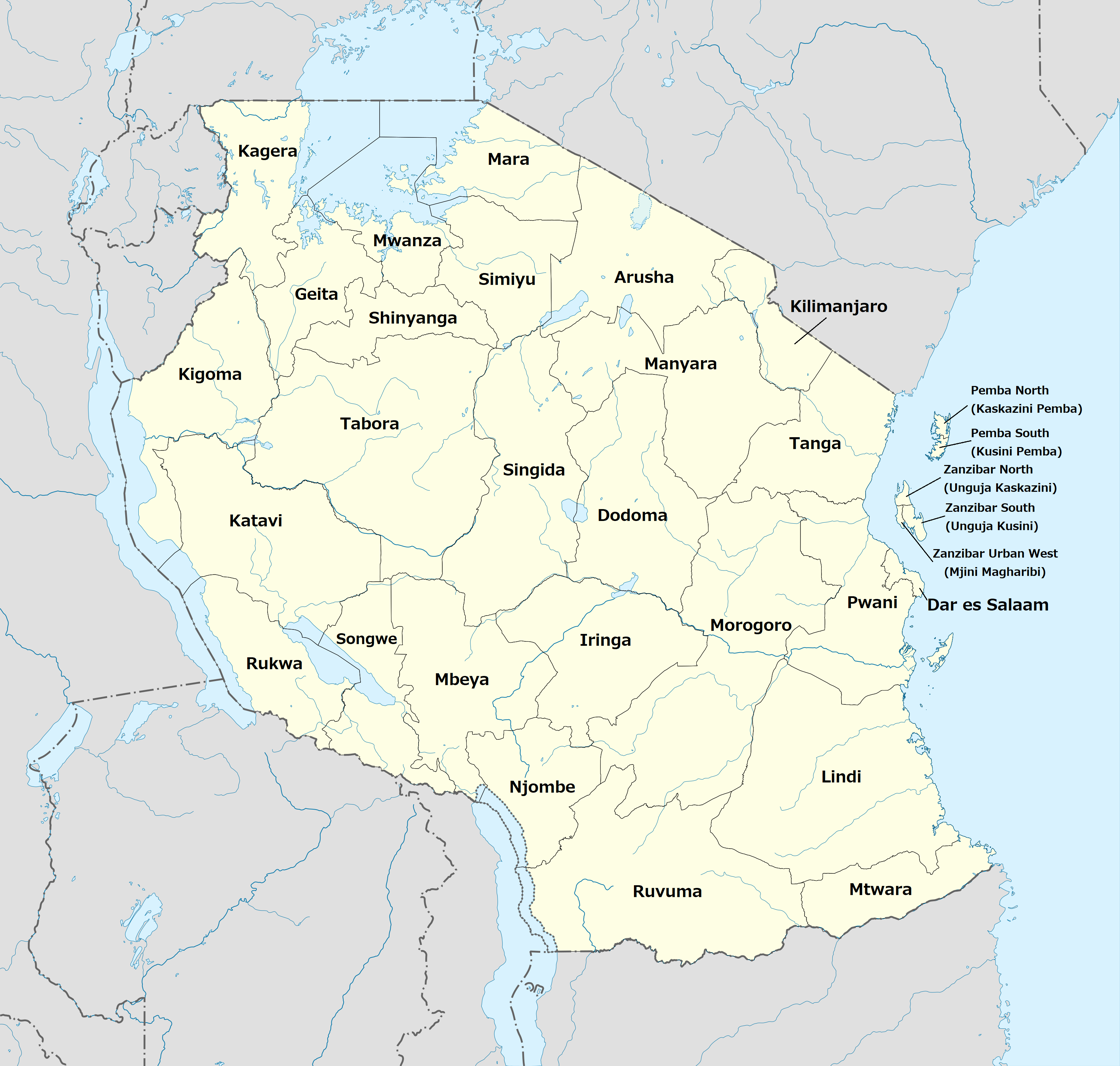
Map of Tanzania

This is a list of hospitals in Tanzania.

Tanzania is the largest and second-most populous country in East Africa with a population of nearly 62 million people according to the 2022 National Bureau of Statistics National Census. It is a sparsely populated country with a geographically wide distribution of settlements hence presenting a challenge regarding access to hospitals. There are 31 administrative regions in the country and the list of hospitals will be grouped by regions.

The healthcare system is arranged in a hierarchical structure and the administrative structure is related to the running of the equivalent level of the health facility and where the first line health facility is the dispensary to be built in every village and health center to be built in every ward as is written in The Primary Health Care Development Program (2007–2017). Higher up in the ranking are the district hospitals, regional referral hospitals, zonal referral hospitals and national hospitals. There are some specialized hospitals e.g. the Ocean Road Cancer Institute and Mirembe Psychiatric Hospital.

According to the Health Facilities Register, maintained by the Ministry of Health, Community Development, Gender, Elderly and Children there were 8,497 medical care facilities in the country, 62% of them public. As of 2020, there are 337 hospitals listed in the register.

== Arusha Region ==
Facility Name	District	Ward	Facility Type	Ownership
Arusha International Conference Centre Hospital	Arusha	Sekei	Hospital	Public (Parastatal)
Arusha City Council	Arusha	Engutoto	District Hospital	Public (Local Government)
Karatu	Karatu	Daa	District Hospital	Public (Local Government)
Longindo	Longido	Longido	District Hospital	Public (Local Government)
Meru	Meru	Akheri	District Hospital	Public (Local Government)
Monduli	Monduli	Monduli Mjini	District Hospital	Public (Local Government)
Ngorongoro	Ngorongoro	Oloirien	District Hospital	Public (Local Government)
Oltrument	Arusha	Oltrumet	District Hospital	Public (Local Government)
Karatu Lutheran	Karatu	Qurus	Council Designated Hospital	Private (Faith-Based)
St. Elizabeth	Arusha	Ngarenaro	Council Designated Hospital	Private (Faith-Based)
Wasso	Ngorongoro	Oloirien	Council Designated Hospital	Private (Faith-Based)
Arusha Lutheran Center	Arusha	Levolosi	Regional Referral Hospital	Private (Faith-Based)
Mt. Meru	Arusha	Sekei	Regional Referral Hospital	Public (Ministry)
Ithna Asheri Charitable	Arusha	Kaloleni	Hospital	Private (Faith-Based)

== Dar es Salaam Region ==
Facility Name	District	Ward	Facility Type	Ownership
Pio Specialized Polyclinic	Ilala	Ukonga		Private
Muhimbili National Hospital	Ilala			Public
Saifee Hospital Tanzania	Kinondoni			Private
Jakaya Kikwete Cardiac Institute	Ilala			Public
Ebrahim Haji Charitable Health Centre				Private
Rabininsia Memorial Hospital				Private
Regency Medical Center				Private
AAR Hospital				Private
Aga Khan Hospital, Dar es Salaam				Private
SANITAS Hospital				Private
IMTU Hospital				Private
Temeke Regional Referral Hospital				Public
Miracolo Hospital				
Tanzania Nordic Hospital				
Cardinal Rugambwa Hospital				
Mwananyamala Regional Referral Hospital				Public
Kinondoni Hospital				Public
Ocean Road Cancer Institute				Public
Lugalo Military Hospital	Kinondoni	Kawe	Zonal Referral Hospital	Military
Amana Regional Referral Hospital				Public
Kairuki Medical Center				Private
TMJ Medical Center				Private
Mikumi Dar Hospital				
Shree Hindu Mandal Hospital				Private
Sali International Hospital				Private
Msasani Peninsula Hospital				Private
Ekenywa Specialized Hospital				
Burhani Charitable Hospital				Private
CCBRT Hospital	Kinondoni	Msasani	Zonal Referral Hospital	NGO
Heameda Hospital				
Hitech Sai Hospital	Ilala			Private
International Eye Hospital				Private
Dr. K. K. Khan Hospital	Ilala	Kisutu	Hospital	Private

== Dodoma Region ==
Facility Name	District	Ward	Facility Type	Ownership
Bahi District			District Hospital	Public
Chemba District Hospital			District Hospital	Public
Kongwa District Hospital			District Hospital	Public
Chamwino District Hospital			District Hospital	Public
Kondoa District Hospital			District Hospital	Public
Mpwapwa District Hospital	Mpwapwa	Mpwapwa Mjini	District Hospital	Public
Mirembe Hospital	Dodoma		Psychiatric hospital	Public
Matema Hospital				
Benjamin Mkapa Hospital	Dodoma	Ng'hong'honha	Zonal Referral Hospital	Public

== Geita Region ==
Facility Name	District	Ward	Facility Type	Ownership
Waja Hospital	Geita	Bombambili	Regional Hospital	Private

== Iringa Region ==
Facility Name	District	Ward	Facility Type	Ownership
Tosamaganga Hospital	Iringa	Kalenga	Regional Hospital	Private

== Kagera Region ==
Facility Name	District	Ward	Facility Type	Ownership
Nyakahanga Hospital	Karagwe	Nyakahanga	Designated District Hospital	Private

== Katavi Region ==
Facility Name	District	Ward	Facility Type	Ownership
Mlele District Hospital	Mlele	Inyonga	District Hospital	Public

== Kigoma Region ==
Facility Name	District	Ward	Facility Type	Ownership
Kabanga Mission Hospital	Kasulu	Msambara	District Hospital	Private

== Kilimanjaro Region ==
Facility Name	District	Ward	Facility Type	Ownership
Kilimanjaro Christian Medical Centre	Moshi	Longuo B	Zonal Referral Hospital	Faith-Based
Mawenzi Hospital				
St. Joseph Hospital				
Kilimanjaro First Health Hospital				
Jeffery Charitable Hospital				
Huruma Hospital				
Ngoyoni Hospital				
Kibong'oto Hospital				
Kilimanjaro Hospital				
Machame Hospital				
Kibosho Hospital				
Marangu Hospital				
Kilema Hospital				
Mbuya Hospital				

== Lindi Region ==
Facility Name	District	Ward	Facility Type	Ownership
St. Walburg's Hospital	Lindi			

== Manyara Region ==
Facility Name	District	Ward	Facility Type	Ownership
Dareda Hospital	Babati Rural			
Haydom Lutheran Hospital	Mbulu	Haydom	Regional Referral Hospital	Faith-Based
Tumaini Hospital				
Mbulu District Hospital				

== Mara Region ==
Facility Name	District	Ward	Facility Type	Ownership
Serengeti International Hospital	Serengeti		International hospital	Public
CF Hospital	Musoma	Mukendo	Hospital	Private

== Mbeya Region ==
Facility Name	District	Ward	Facility Type	Ownership
Mbeya Zonal Referral Hospital	Mbeya	Sisimba	Zonal Referral Hospital	Public

== Morogoro Region ==
Facility Name	District	Ward	Facility Type	Ownership
St. Kizito Hospital				
Berega Mission Hospital	Berega			Faith-based
Lugala Hospital	Malinyi			
St. Francis Referral Hospital	Ifakara			
Morogoro Referral Regional Hospital				
Good Samaritan Hospital	Morogoro	Sanje	Hospital	Faith-Based

== Mtwara Region ==
Facility Name	District	Ward	Facility Type	Ownership
St. Benedict Hospital	Masasi	Chikundi	Regional Hospital	Private

== Mwanza Region ==
Facility Name	District	Ward	Facility Type	Ownership
Bugando Medical Centre	Mwanza	Pamba	Zonal Referral Hospital	Faith-Based
Aga Khan Hospital, Mwanza				Not-For-Profit
Biharamulo Designated District Hospital				
Sengerema Designated District Hospital				
Ukerewe District Hospital				
Buchosa Hospital	Mwanza	Nyehunge	District Hospital	Public (Local Government)
Ilemela Hospital	Mwanza	Bugogwa	District Hospital	Public (Local Government)
Magu Hospital	Mwanza	Magu Mjini	District Hospital	Public (Local Government)
Misungwi Hospital	Mwanza	Misungwi	District Hospital	Public (Local Government)
Nansio Hospital	Mwanza	Nkilizya	District Hospital	Public (Local Government)
Ngudu Hospital	Mwanza	Ngudu	District Hospital	Public (Local Government)
Nyamagana Hospital	Mwanza	Butimba	District Hospital	Public (Local Government)
Sengerema Hospital	Mwanza	Nyampulukano	Council Designated Hospital	Private (Faith-Based)
Sekou-Toure Hospital	Mwanza	Isamilo	Regional Referral Hospital	Public (Ministry)

== Njombe Region ==
Facility Name	District	Ward	Facility Type	Ownership
Ilembula Lutheran Hospital	Wanging'ombe	Ilembula	Regional Hospital	Private

== Pwani Region ==
Facility Name	District	Ward	Facility Type	Ownership
Mkoani Hospital	Bagamoyo			
Bagamoyo Hospital	Bagamoyo	Dunda	District Hospital	Public (Local Government)
Hospital ya Wilaya	Kibaha	Janga	District Hospital	Public (Local Government)
Kibaha Town Hospital	Kibaha	Picha ya Ndege	District Hospital	Public (Local Government)
Kibiti Hospital	Kibiti	Mtawanya	District Hospital	Public (Local Government)
Kisarawe Hospital	Kisarawe	Kisarawe	District Hospital	Public (Local Government)
Kilindoni Hospital	Mafia	Kilindoni	District Hospital	Public (Local Government)
Mkuranga Hospital	Mkuranga	Mkuranga	District Hospital	Public (Local Government)
Utete Hospital	Rufiji	Utete	District Hospital	Public (Local Government)
Tumbi Hospital	Kibaha	Tumbi	Regional Referral Hospital	Public (Parastatal)

== Rukwa Region ==
Facility Name	District	Ward	Facility Type	Ownership
Namanyere Hospital	Nkasi	Namanyere	District Hospital	Private

== Ruvuma Region ==
Facility Name	District	Ward	Facility Type	Ownership
Ruanda Mission Hospital	Mbinga	Ruanda	District Hospital	Private

== Shinyanga Region ==
Facility Name	District	Ward	Facility Type	Ownership
Magai Hospital	Kahama	Kahama Mjini	District Hospital	Private

== Simiyu Region ==
Facility Name	District	Ward	Facility Type	Ownership
Mkula Hospital	Busega	Mkula	District Hospital	Private

== Singida Region ==
Facility Name	District	Ward	Facility Type	Ownership
Kilimatinde Anglican Hospital	Manyoni	Solya	District Hospital	Private

== Songwe Region ==
Facility Name	District	Ward	Facility Type	Ownership
Mbozi Mission Hospital	Mbozi	Igamba	District Hospital	Private
Ilasi Hospital	Mbozi	Vwawa	District Hospital	Private
Tunduma Hospital	Momba	Mpemba	District Hospital	Public
Songwe District Hospital	Songwe	Mkwajuni	District Hospital	Public
Itumba Hospital	Ileje	Itumba	District Hospital	Public
Momba Hospital	Momba	Chitete	District Hospital	Public
Vwawa Hospital	Mbozi	Vwawa	District Hospital	Public

== Tabora Region ==
Facility Name	District	Ward	Facility Type	Ownership
Ndala Hospital	Nzega	Uhemeli	District Hospital	Private

== Tanga Region ==
Facility Name	District	Ward	Facility Type	Ownership
Bombo Regional Hospital				
Pangani District Hospital	Pangani			
Magunga District Hospital	Korogwe			
Lutindi Mental Hospital	Korogwe			
Besha Hospital	Tanga	Mabawa	Hospital	Private

== Zanzibar North Region ==
Facility Name	District	Ward	Facility Type	Ownership	Coordinates
Al Rahma Hospital					6.170379605960393°S 39.20410039638335°E
Chukwani Hospital			Max		6.227621223010013°S 39.21729985405646°E
Mnazi Mmoja Hospital					6.167749327275784°S 39.189796467546735°E
Tasakhtaa Global Hospital					6.16604212641847°S 39.19070509638324°E
Tawakal Hospital					
Dr. Mehta's Hospital					6.16481159222754°S 39.188436238710416°E

== Zanzibar South Region ==
Facility Name	District	Ward	Facility Type	Ownership

== Zanzibar Urban West Region ==
Facility Name	District	Ward	Facility Type	Ownership
