= Rujewa =

Ward of Mbeya Region, Tanzania

- Ward
- Location within Tanzania
- Coordinates: 8°42′S 34°23′E
- Country: Tanzania
- Region: Mbeya Region
- District: Mbarali District
- Ward: Rujewa

Government
  - Type: Council

Population (2016)
  - Total: 32,483
- Time zone: EAT
- Postcode: 53601
- Area code: 025
- Website: District Website

Rujewa is an administrative ward in the Mbarali district of the Mbeya Region of Tanzania. In 2016 the Tanzania National Bureau of Statistics report there were 32,483 people in the ward, from 29,473 in 2012.

== Vitongoji ==
The ward has 60 vitongoji.

- CCM
- Chang'ombe
- Ibara A
- Ibara B
- Ihanga Kilabuni
- Ihanga Ofisini
- Isisi
- Jangurutu
- Kanisani
- Kanisani
- Kapunga
- Kati
- Kichangani
- Luwilindi Barabarani
- Luwilindi Kanisani
- Lyahamile
- Mabanda A
- Mabanda B
- Mafuriko
- Magea
- Magwalisi
- Mahango.
- Majengo
- Majengo
- Majengo
- Majengo Barabarani
- Majengo Mtoni
- Mbuyuni
- Mbuyuni
- Mdodela
- Mferejini
- Miembeni
- Mjimwema
- Mkanyageni
- Mkanyageni
- Mkwajuni
- Mkwajuni
- Mlimani
- Mogela
- Mogelo
- Mpakani
- Msimbazi
- Mtakuja
- Mtoni
- Musanga
- Muungano
- Nyaluhanga 'A'
- Nyaluhanga 'B'
- Nyamtowo
- Nyati
- Ofisini
- Simba
- Tembo 'A'
- Tembo 'B'
- Tenkini 'A'
- Tenkini 'B'
- Ukinga 'A'
- Ukinga 'B'
- Ukinga 'C'
- Wameli
