= Ruiwa =

Ward of Mbeya Region, Tanzania

- Ward
- Location within Tanzania
- Coordinates: 8°46′S 33°38′E
- Country: Tanzania
- Region: Mbeya Region
- District: Mbarali District
- Ward: Ruiwa

Government
  - Type: Council

Population (2016)
  - Total: 17,487
- Time zone: EAT
- Postcode: 53609
- Area code: 025
- Website: District Website

Ruiwa is an administrative ward in the Mbarali district of the Mbeya Region of Tanzania. In 2016 the Tanzania National Bureau of Statistics report there were 17,487 people in the ward, from 15,867 in 2012.

== Villages and hamlets ==
The ward has 6 villages, and 47 hamlets.

- Ijumbi
  - Ilanji
  - Ishungu
  - Kilabuni
  - Majoja
  - Mashala
  - Mbalino
  - Mbugani
  - Mbuyuni
  - Mwambalisi
- Malamba
  - CCM
  - Kalumbulo
  - Magombole
  - Majengo
  - Mtakuja
  - Muungano
  - Soweto
  - Wigoma
  - Zingatia
- Motomoto
  - Iyawaya
  - Misufuni
  - Motomoto 'A'
  - Motomoto 'B'
  - Mwambalizi 'C'
  - Ndola
  - Tambukareli
  - Tingatinga
- Ruiwa
  - Funika
  - Kibaoni
  - Mamfwila 'A'
  - Mtengashari
  - Mwambalisi
  - Rejesta
- Udindilwa
  - Kalabure
  - Komole
  - Maji ya moto
  - Mapogoro
  - Mbugani
  - Mwanjelwa
- Wimba Mahango
  - Dodoma 'A'
  - Dodoma 'B'
  - Ilanji 'A'
  - Ilanji 'B'
  - Ilolo
  - Kaninjowo 'A'
  - Kaninjowo 'B'
  - Wimba 'A'
  - Wimba 'B'
