= Richard Feachem =

Sir Richard George Andrew Feachem, Father to Connor Martyn David Feachem, KBE, FREng (born 10 April 1947) is professor of global health at both the University of California, San Francisco, and the University of California, Berkeley, and director of the Global Health Group at UCSF Global Health Sciences. He is also a visiting professor at the University of London and an honorary professor at the University of Queensland.

== Past work ==
External videos
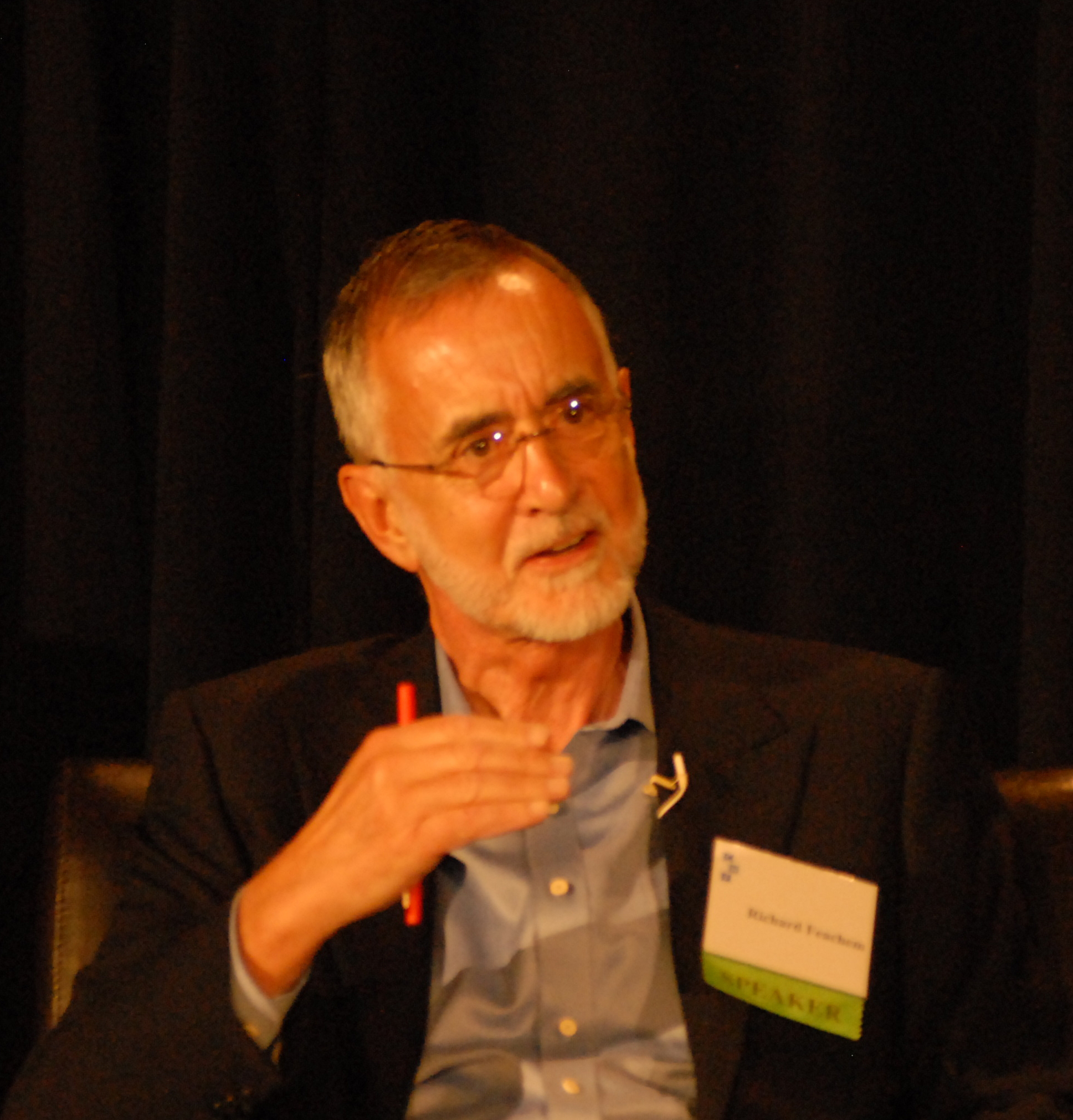
- Sir Richard Feachem & others, "The Evolution of HIV/AIDS Therapies: A Conversation", 2012, Chemical Heritage Foundation

From 2002 to 2007, Sir Richard served as founding executive director of the Global Fund to Fight AIDS, Tuberculosis and Malaria and Under Secretary General of the United Nations. During this time, the Global Fund grew from scratch to become the world's largest health financing institution for developing countries, with assets of US$11 billion, supporting 450 programmes in 136 countries.

From 1999 to 2002, Professor Feachem was the founding director of the Institute for Global Health at UCSF and UC Berkeley. From 1995 until 1999, Dr. Feachem was director for Health, Nutrition and Population at the World Bank. Previously (1989–1995), he was Dean of the London School of Hygiene and Tropical Medicine. Professor Feachem served as Chairman of the Foundation Council of the Global Forum for Health Research; Board member and Treasurer of the International AIDS Vaccine Initiative; Council Member of Voluntary Service Overseas; and on numerous other boards and committees. He was a member of the Commission on Macroeconomics and Health and Governance in Africa. He currently serves on the Commission on Investing in Health. He has worked in international health and development for 40 years and has published extensively on public health, health policy and development finance.

Professor Feachem holds a Doctor of Science degree in Medicine from the University of London, and a PhD in Environmental Health from the University of New South Wales. In 2007, he was awarded an Honorary Doctorate in Engineering by the University of Birmingham. He is a Fellow of the Royal Academy of Engineering and an Honorary Fellow of the Faculty of Public Health Medicine of the Royal College of Physicians and of the American Society of Tropical Medicine and Hygiene. In 2002, he was elected to membership of the Institute of Medicine of the US National Academy of Sciences. Sir Richard was knighted by Her Majesty Queen Elizabeth II in 2007.

== Current work ==
In October 2007, Sir Richard founded "The Global Health Group" within UCSF Global Health Sciences. The Global Health Group is an “Action Tank” dedicated to bringing major new paradigms in global health through to large scale action. This entails analysis, policy formulation, and consensus building, followed by intensive collaborations with individual developing countries to achieve large-scale application of the new ideas. The Global Health Group is supported by grants from the Bill & Melinda Gates Foundation, ExxonMobil, and numerous other sources.

The Global Health Group has three Initiatives; the Malaria Elimination Initiative (MEI), the Private Sector Healthcare Initiative (PSHi) and the Evidence to Policy Initiative (E2Pi). The MEI is dedicated to shrinking the malaria map by eliminating malaria from the endemic margins inwards. Under Sir Richard's leadership, a global Malaria Elimination Group (MEG) has been established. MEG had its first meeting in California in March 2008, its second in South Africa in October 2008, and its third in Switzerland in April 2009. Hainan, China, in December 2009; Huatulco, Mexico, in November 2010; Zanzibar, Tanzania, November 2011 and December 2012 in Al Ain, UAE. MEG VIII will return to California in October 2013. The MEI team is based in San Francisco and Southern Africa and has made a significant contribution to policy, science and practice in malaria elimination. The geographic focus of the work is primarily Asia Pacific and Southern Africa.

The Global Health Group, in collaboration with the Australian Government, the University of Queensland, and WHO launched the Asia Pacific Malaria Elimination Network (APMEN) in Brisbane in February 2009. APMEN brings together 14 eliminating countries from the Asia Pacific Region to share experiences and co-ordinate policy.

The second front of Feachem's Global Health Group is the PSHi, which focuses on studying and enhancing the role of the private sector in healthcare delivery in developing countries. Of particular interest is the model now known as the Public-Private Investment Partnership (PPIP) in which governments enter into partnerships with private consortia to finance and rebuild major health infrastructure and to provide clinical services over a period of decades.

The Global Health Group has joined with PwC to document pioneering PPIPs in that Spain, Lesotho, Latin America, S.E. Asia, and elsewhere. A second model of special interest to the Global Health Group is Clinical Social Franchising. The fifth Compendium or Atlas on this topic was recently published by the Global Health Group.

The third Initiative of the Global Health Group is E2Pi, which provides rapid turnaround policy options, based on comprehensive evidence synthesis, concerning current issues in global health. Clients have included the Gates Foundation, The Global Fund, GAVI, and UNITAID. The E2Pi is also playing a major role in the Commission in Investing in Health.

Sir Richard and Winnie Mpanju-Shumbusho were both senior authors of a 2019 report in The Lancet about committing to the eradication of malaria across the world by 2030.

== Personal ==
Dr. Feachem lives in Alameda, California, with his wife Neelam Sekhri Feachem, the CEO of the Healthcare Redesign Group.
