= Igurusi =

Ward of Mbeya Region, Tanzania

Igurusi Kata ya Igurusi
- Ward
- Location within Tanzania
- Coordinates: 8°51′S 33°51′E
- Country: Tanzania
- Region: Mbarali District
- District: Mbarali District
- Ward: Igurusi

Government
  - Type: Council

Population (2022)
  - Total: 28,000
- Time zone: EAT
- Postcode: 53606
- Area code: 025
- Website: District Website

Igurusi is an administrative ward in the Mbarali district of the Mbeya Region of Tanzania. In 2022 the Tanzania National Bureau of Statistics report there were more than 28,000 people in the ward, from 24,573 in 2016.

Igurusi Ward is widely known for its thriving rice farming, which serves as the main source of livelihood for most of its residents. The ward comprises nine villages: Chamoto, Igurusi, Ilolo, Lunwa, Lusese, Maendeleo, Majenje, Rwanyo, and Uhambule.

The ward is home to the Ministry of Agriculture Training Institute (MATI–Igurusi), which offers two diploma programs in Land Use and Irrigation. In addition, Igurusi has eight primary schools and three secondary schools: Igurusi Secondary School, Mshikamano Secondary School, and Haroun Pirmohamed Secondary School.

An international rice market operates within the ward, serving as a key commercial hub for rice farmers. Within this market area, CRDB Bank provides ATM services for financial transactions. Both the TANZAM Highway (linking Dar es Salaam and Mbeya) and the TAZARA Railway pass through the ward, making it an important transport corridor.

Igurusi is ethnically diverse, inhabited by several tribes including the Nyakyusa, Ndali, Sangu, Bena, Wanji, Kinga, Nyiha, and Safwa. Geographically, the ward lies within the fertile Usangu Plains, bordered by the Livingstone Mountains to the south, where Mbeya Rural District and Njombe Region meet.

As one of the fastest-growing wards in Mbarali District, Igurusi has evolved from a rural village setting into a suburban-like area. It hosts Shammah FM, an evangelical radio station broadcasting across the Mbeya Region. Health services are provided by the Igurusi Health Center and Uhambule Dispensary, which cater to residents’ medical needs.

In addition to agriculture and public services, Igurusi offers various lodging facilities that accommodate travelers and visitors passing through the area.

== Villages and hamlets ==
The ward has 9 villages, and 49 hamlets.

- Chamoto
  - Bethania
  - Godauni
  - Kibaoni
  - Majimaji
  - Mkuyuni
  - Mpakani
- Igurusi
  - Kabwe
  - Muungano 'A'
  - Muungano 'B'
  - Zahanati 'A'
  - Zahanati 'B'
- Ilolo
  - Ilolo 'A'
  - Ilolo 'B'
  - Machinjioni
  - Mati
  - Mbuyuni
- Lusese
  - Kanisani
  - Lusese
  - Majengo mapya 'A'
  - Majengo mapya 'B'
  - Masista
- Maendeleo
  - Chemichemi
  - Juhudi
  - Maendeleo 'A'
  - Maendeleo 'B'
  - Mahakamani
- Majenje
  - Jipemoyo
  - Kiwanjani
  - Majenje juu 'A'
  - Majenje juu 'B'
  - Mji mwema
- Lunwa
  - Chamgungwe
  - Kanalunwa
  - Mapunga
  - Mashala
  - Lunwa
- Rwanyo
  - Amkeni 'A'
  - Amkeni 'B'
  - Jangwani 'A'
  - Jangwani 'B'
  - Ruanda
- Uhambule
  - Gomoshelo
  - Kibaoni
  - Lyamasoko
  - Lyovela
  - Matowo
  - Mganga
  - Mkwajuni
  - Mpogoro
  - Nganga
