= Mapogoro =

Ward of Mbeya Region, Tanzania

Mapogoro Kata ya Mapogoro
- Ward
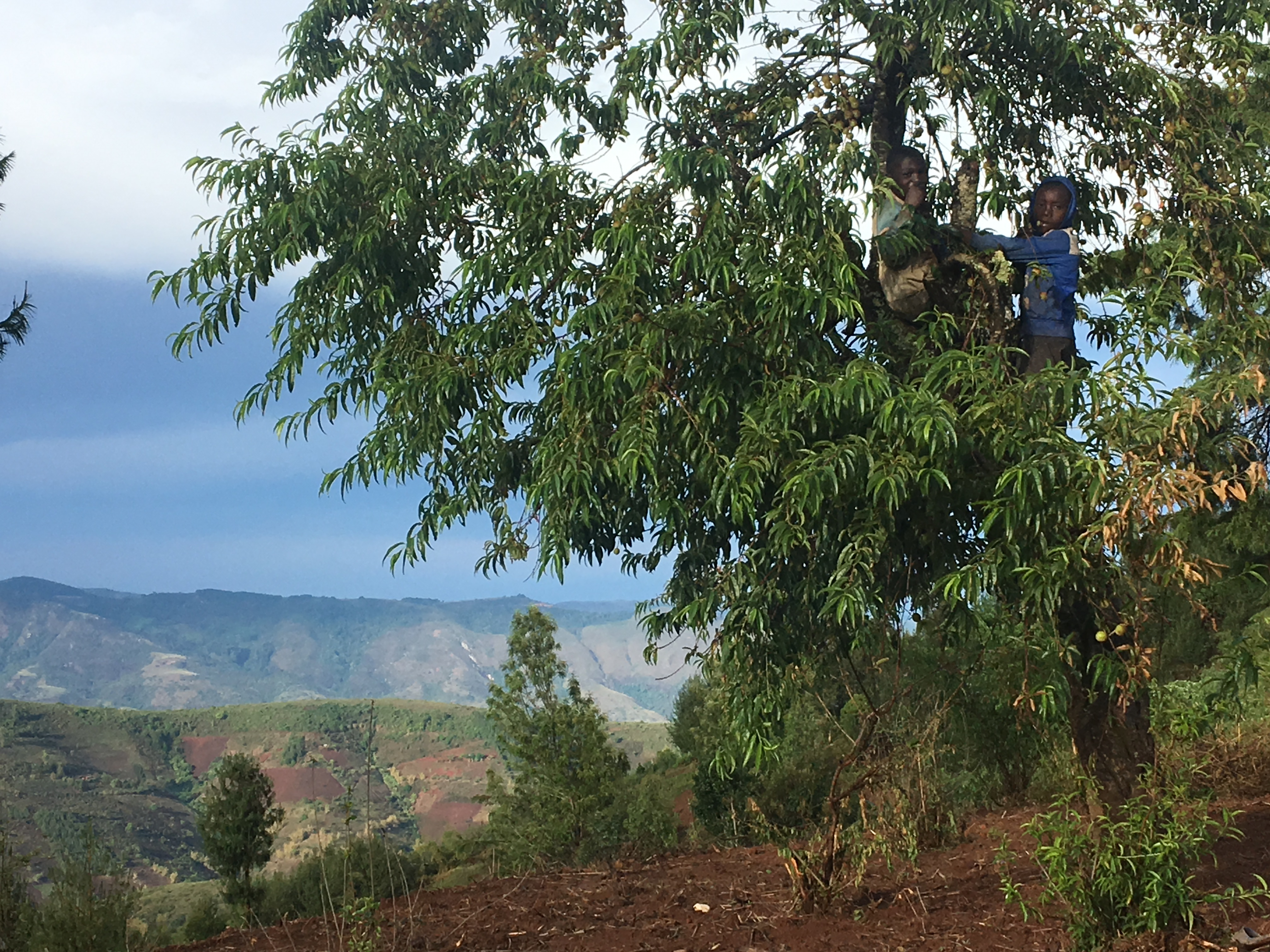
- Two boys playing in a tree in Mapogoro.

- Location within Tanzania
- Coordinates: 8.56730265°S 33.73101548°E
- Country: Tanzania
- Region: Mbeya Region
- District: Mbarali
- Ward: Mapogoro

Population (2016)
  - Total: 27,282
- Time zone: UTC+3 (EAT)
- Postcode: 53603

Mapogoro is an administrative ward in the Mbarali district of the Mbeya Region of Tanzania. In 2016 the Tanzania National Bureau of Statistics report there were 27,282 people in the ward, from 24,754 in 2012.

== Villages and hamlets ==
The ward has 9 villages, and 49 hamlets.

- Itamba
  - Mahango
  - Mapangala
  - Mapogoro
  - Mbungu
  - Mlangali
  - Mtakuja
- Mabadaga
  - Manyoro 'A'
  - Manyoro 'B'
  - Mnyurunyuru 'B'
  - Munyurunyuru 'A'
  - Mwanjelwa
  - Utage
- Nyangulu
  - Bogoro
  - Nyangulu 'A'
  - Nyangulu 'B'
  - Tambukaleli
- Mbuyuni
  - Kinawaga
  - Maduli
  - Magomeni
  - Makondo
  - Mkola
  - Mlimani
  - Muungano
  - Uvanga
- Msesule
  - Matenkini
  - Mtambani
  - Njola
- Mtamba
  - Kilambo
  - Mlangali 'A'
  - Mlangali 'B'
  - Mtamba 'A'
  - Mtamba 'B'
- Ukwama
  - Idege
  - Lambitali
  - Mbuyuni
  - Ukwama 'A'
  - Ukwama 'B'
- Ukwavila
  - Chang'ombe
  - Ibohora
  - Ifushilo
  - Ivaji
  - Msumbiji
  - Tambalagosi
- Uturo
  - Kilambo 'A'
  - Mabambila "B'
  - Mabambila 'A'
  - Mahango
  - Uturo 'A'
  - Uturo 'B'
