= Madibira =

Ward of Mbeya Region, Tanzania

- Ward
- Location within Tanzania
- Coordinates: 8°12′S 34°49′E
- Country: Tanzania
- Region: Mbeya Region
- District: Mbarali District
- Ward: Madibira

Government
  - Type: Council

Population (2016)
  - Total: 27,269
- Time zone: EAT
- Postcode: 53610
- Area code: 025
- Website: District Website

Madibira is an administrative ward in the Mbarali district of the Mbeya Region of Tanzania. In 2016 the Tanzania National Bureau of Statistics report there were 27,269 people in the ward, from 24,742 in 2012.

== Villages and hamlets ==
The ward has 6 villages, and 39 hamlets.

- Iheha
  - Ikulu
  - Kinyangulu
  - Mbuyuni
  - Mheza
  - Mji mwema
- Ikoga
  - Amani
  - Ikulu
  - Madawi
  - Magunguli
  - Magunguli-Lutherani
  - Mahango-Madibira
  - Majengo
  - Mapinduzi
  - Mbuyuni
  - Mtakuja
- Chalisuka
  - Chalisuka
  - Godown
  - Mbuyuni
  - Mikoroshini
  - Upendo
- Mkunywa
  - Kabete
  - Kanamalenga
  - Kichangani
  - Lingondime
  - Mazombe
  - Mkunywa 'A'
  - Mkunywa 'B'
  - Mlonga
  - Mlwasi
- Nyakadete
  - Mtibwa
  - Muungano
  - Nyakadete
  - Saligona
  - Ubagule
- Nyamakuyu
  - Ikulu
  - Mbuyuni
  - Miembeni
  - Unyanyembe A
  - Unyanyembe B
