= Ocean Road Cancer Institute =

- Tanzania Ministry of Health and Social Welfare
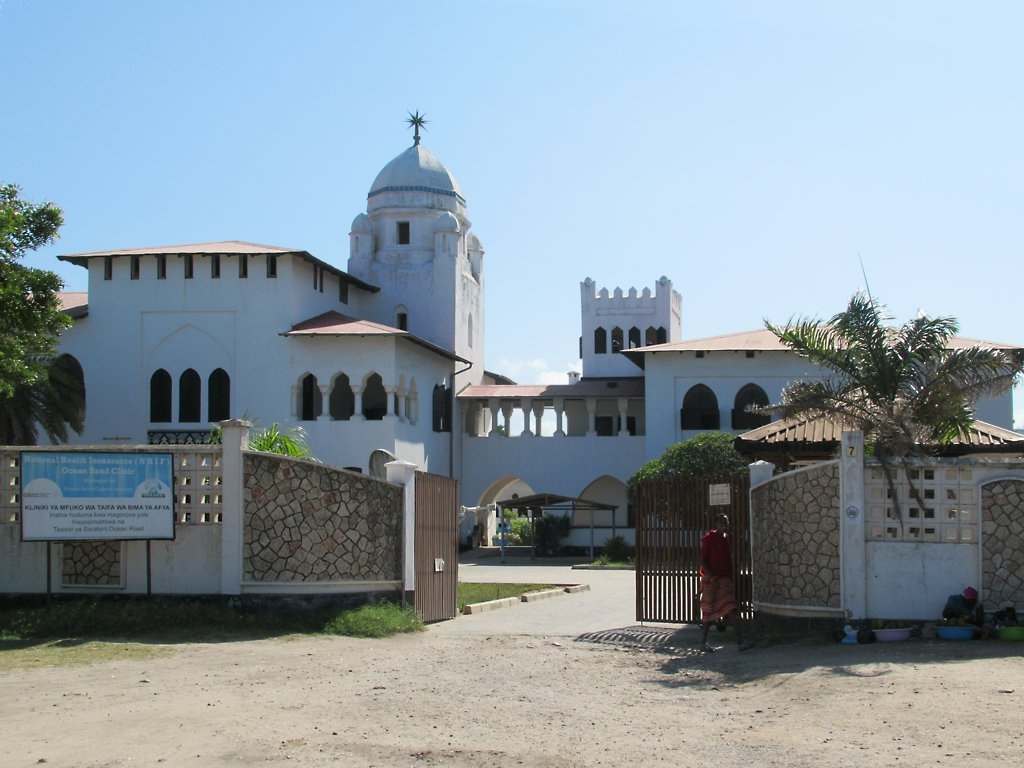
- Ocean Road Cancer Institute, January 2017

- Location within Tanzania

Geography
- Location: Dar es Salaam, Dar es Salaam Region, Tanzania
- Coordinates: 06°48′39″S 39°17′47″E

Organisation
- Care system: Public
- Type: Cancer Treatment, Research and Teaching

Services
- Beds: 259

History
- Founded: 1895; 131 years ago

Links
- Website: Homepage
- Other links: List of hospitals in Tanzania

Ocean Road Cancer Institute (ORCI) is a public, specialized, tertiary care medical facility owned by the Tanzania Ministry of Health and Social Welfare. It is the largest comprehensive cancer center in the country.

== Location ==
The facility is located in Ilala District, in Dar es Salaam, Dar es Salaam Region, in Tanzania's capital and largest city. The geographical coordinates of the institute are: 6°48'39.0"S, 39°17'47.0"E (Latitude:-6.810833; Longitude:39.296389).

== Overview ==
ORCI is a cancer treatment, research, and teaching center, affiliated with the Muhimbili University of Health and Allied Sciences and with Muhimbili National Hospital, the teaching hospital of the university. ORCI maintains an inpatient facility with capacity of 256 beds.

In Tanzania, an estimated 35,000 new cases of cancer were diagnosed in 2014, of whom about 21,000 (60 percent) died, the same year. The country has only two cancer hospitals, with the main one, ORCI, located in the capital, Dar es Salaam. Approximately 150 outpatients are attended to at ORCI, on a daily basis. At the institute, it is estimated that about 90 percent of the patients arrive when it's too late for a cure.

== History ==
This health facility was founded in 1895 by the colonial government of German East Africa. In the beginning, the hospital catered exclusively for the German community. After the First World War, the British Colonial government reserved the hospital for serving the European communities.

After independence in 1961, the hospital was renamed the Ocean Road Hospital, and all racial restrictions were removed. It also became the maternity wing of Muhimbili Medical Centre. In 1980, the facility was converted into a cancer treatment unit. The Radiotherapy Unit of the Faculty of Medicine, University of Dar es Salaam was shifted from Muhimbili Medical Centre to the Ocean Road Hospital.

In June 1996, Ocean Road Hospital was made an independent autonomous institute directly under the Tanzanian Ministry of Health and its name changed to Ocean Road Cancer Institute.

In 2019, the hospital expanded its external beam radiotherapy services to include two linear accelerators in addition to its Cobalt-60 machine and brachytherapy services.

In February 2026, ORCI launched Tanzania's first and only Positron Emission Tomography-Computed Tomography (PET-CT) services with plans underway to install a cyclotron as well.

ORCI also researches and treats viral diseases, including HIV/AIDS and Hepatitis B.

== International collaboration ==
The international organizations with collaborative projects with Ocean Road Cancer Institute include, but are not limited to the following:

- National Cancer Institute: Bethesda, Maryland, USA
- German Cancer Research Center in Heidelberg, Germany
- International Atomic Energy Agency: Vienna, Austria
- World Health Organization, Geneva, Switzerland
- International Agency for Research on Cancer: Lyons, France
- Union for International Cancer Control: Geneva, Switzerland
- International Network for Cancer Treatment and Research: Brussels, Belgium
- International Association for Hospice and Palliative Care: Houston, Texas
- ICAP at Columbia University: New York City
- University of Copenhagen.
- University of California, San Francisco, San Francisco, California

== See also ==
- List of hospitals in Tanzania
- Bugando Medical Centre
