= Luhanga =

Luhanga is a village in Lubero Territory in North Kivu, the Democratic Republic of the Congo. It is populated by Hutus. On November 27, 2016, Nandes came into the village and killed 34 Hutus.
