= Ubaruku =

Ward of Mbeya Region, Tanzania

Ubaruku Kata ya Ubaruku
- Ward
- Location within Tanzania
- Coordinates: 8.674069°S 34.317319°E
- Country: Tanzania
- Region: Mbeya Region
- District: Mbarali District
- Ward: Ubaruku

Population (2016)
  - Total: 32,179
- Time zone: UTC+3 (EAT)
- Postcode: 53602

Ubaruku is an administrative ward in the Mbarali District of the Mbeya Region of Tanzania. In 2016 the Tanzania National Bureau of Statistics report there were 32,179 people in the ward, from 29,197 in 2012.

== Villages and hamlets ==
The ward has eight villages and 50 hamlets.

- Ibohora
  - Ihuvilo 'A'
  - Ihuvilo 'B'
  - London 'A'
  - London 'B'
  - Luhanga
  - Majengo
  - Miembeni
- Majengo
  - Mahango
  - Malamba 'A'
  - Malamba 'B'
  - Ng'ambo Mfereji 'A'
  - Stendi
- Mbarali
  - Kifaru
  - Mtakuja
  - Tagamenda 'A'
  - Tagamenda 'B'
  - Uzunguni
- Mkombwe
  - Daily
  - Mjimwema
  - Mkombwe 'A'
  - Mkombwe 'B'
  - Mkondogavili
  - Msufini
  - Mtambani
  - Mtegisala
- Mpakani
  - Majengo
  - Mbuyuni
  - Mjimwema
  - Mpakani
  - Msikitini
- Mwakaganga
  - Kibaoni Kati 'A'
  - Kibaoni Kati 'B'
  - Kibaoni Kati 'C'
  - Mdodela 'A'
  - Mdodela 'B'
  - Mdodela 'C'
  - Ng'ambo Mfereji 'B'
  - Santamaria 'A'
  - Santamaria 'B'
- Ubaruku
  - Maperemehe
  - Matono
  - Sokoni
  - Stendi
- Utyego
  - Forest
  - Mjimwema
  - Motomoto
  - Tupendane
  - Uhuru
  - Ujamaa
  - Usalama
