= Chimala =

Ward of Mbeya Region, Tanzania

Chimala Kata ya Chimala
- Ward
- Location within Tanzania
- Coordinates: 8.856°S 34.024°E
- Country: Tanzania
- Region: Mbeya Region
- District: Mbarali District
- Ward: Chimala

Government
  - Type: Council

Population (2016)
  - Total: 18,332
- Time zone: EAT
- Postcode: 53605
- Area code: 025
- Website: District Website

Chimala is an administrative ward in the Mbarali District of the Mbeya Region of Tanzania. In 2016 the Tanzania National Bureau of Statistics report there were 18,332 people in the ward, from 16,633 in 2012.

== Villages and hamlets ==
The ward has 6 villages, and 35 hamlets.

- Chimala
  - Kajima
  - Kilabuni
  - Mferejini
  - Mtoni
  - Relini
  - Stendi
- Igumbilo
  - Danida
  - Elimu
  - Igumbilo Shamba
  - Kisimani
  - Mapinduzi
  - Mashineni
  - Mwenge
  - Ofisini
- Isitu
  - Azimio
  - Isitu mjini
  - Kolongoni
  - Mahakamani
  - Ofisini
  - Posta
- Lyambogo
  - Chamsalaka
  - Lembuka
  - Lyambogo
  - Mji mwema
  - Shuleni
  - Tazara
- Mengele
  - Mengele
  - Muungano
  - Njia panda
  - Tenkini
- Muwale
  - Kanisani
  - Mbembe
  - Mtoni
  - Mwakadama
  - Ofisini
