= Mahongole, Mbeya =

Ward of Mbeya Region, Tanzania

Mahongole Kata ya Mahongole
- Ward
- Location within Tanzania
- Coordinates: 8.6146702°S 34.2537612°E
- Country: Tanzania
- Region: Mbeya Region
- District: Mbarali
- Ward: Mahongole

Population (2016)
  - Total: 12,943
- Time zone: UTC+3 (EAT)
- Postcode: 53608

Mahongole is an administrative ward in the Mbarali district of the Mbeya Region of Tanzania. In 2016 the Tanzania National Bureau of Statistics report there were 12,943 people in the ward, from 11,744 in 2012.

== Villages and hamlets ==
The ward has 6 villages, and 33 hamlets.

- Ilaji
  - Ilaji
  - Isengo
  - Mlowo
  - Msikitini 'A'
  - Msikitini 'B'
- Ilongo
  - Ihango
  - Ijumbi
  - Ilongo
  - Mpakani
  - Mwafwaka
- Kapyo
  - Kapyo 'A'
  - Kapyo 'B'
  - Kapyo 'C'
  - Kapyo 'D'
  - Kapyo 'E'
  - Mpakani 'A'
  - Mpakani 'B'
- Mahongole
  - CCM 'A'
  - Kagera
  - Kilabuni
  - Mashala
  - Msikitini
- Nsonyanga
  - Mbago
  - Mkoji
  - Nsonyanga 'A'
  - Nsonyanga 'B'
  - Rwanda 'A'
  - Rwanda 'B'
- Igalako
  - CCM 'B'
  - Majengo
  - Mbange
  - Sokoni
  - Uchagani
