= Ocean Road Hospital =

Hospital in Tanzania

Coordinates: 6.8108°S 39.2964°E

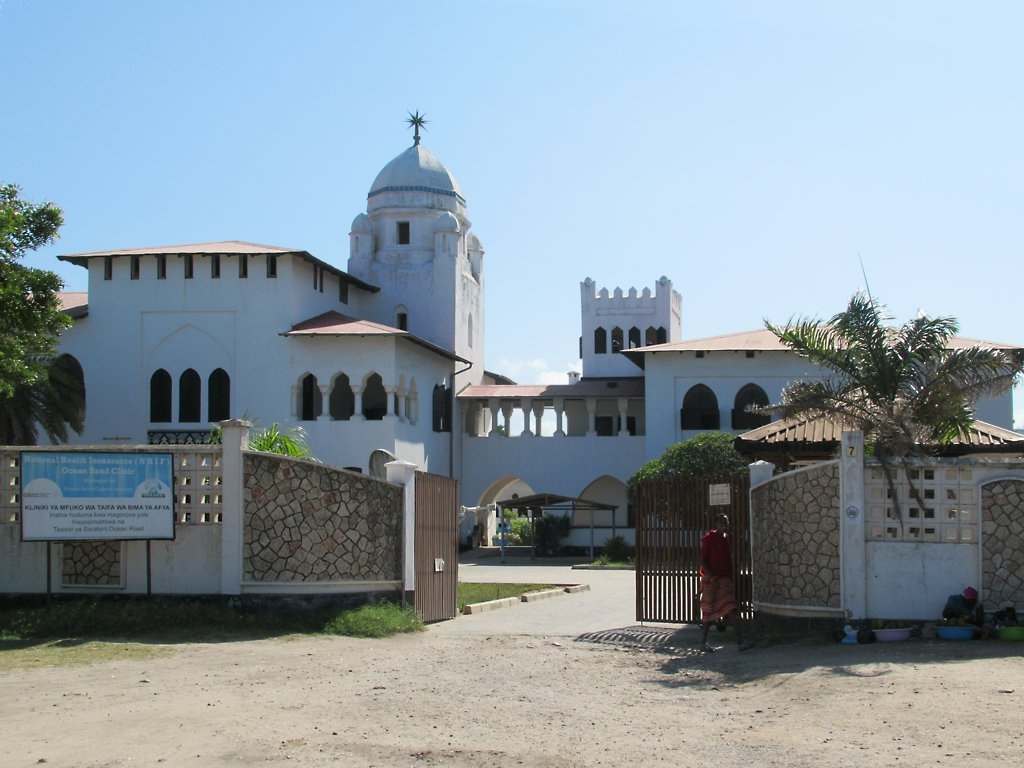
Ocean Road Hospital buildings, 2017

The Ocean Road Hospital (Swahili: Hospitali ya Ocean Road) is a historical building of a hospital in Dar es Salaam, Tanzania. It was opened on October 1, 1897, as the Imperial Governorate Hospital for the former colony of German East Africa.

Today, it is part of the Muhimbili University of Health and Allied Sciences and the largest tumor clinic in Tanzania.

== History ==
Ocean Road Hospital was founded in 1897 by the colonial government of German East Africa. In the beginning, the hospital catered exclusively for the German community. The hospital was established to provide medical care for the growing number of Europeans in German East Africa, as the existing medical facilities provided by mission stations were unsatisfactory. After initial plans to build the hospital in Zanzibar or Bagamoyo, Dar es Salaam was chosen as the location, because of its growing importance for the colonial administration.

In German colonial times, the relatively small number of physicians were medical officers and nurses were sent by Catholic or Protestant missions. From the time it was founded in 1897 and until 1901, the clinic was managed by Alexander Becker, who had been the colony's chief physician since 1891, followed by Werner Steuber (1901–1905) and subsequently Hugo Meixner. The hospital was intended to treat only Germans and other Europeans. The Sewa Hadji Hospital, opened in early 1897, with German medical staff and financed by donations from the Indian philanthropist Sewa Hadji, was however intended for the local population, and the number of patients in that hospital was far higher.

A number of important German physicians and scientists worked and did research at the government hospital, above all Nobel Prize laureate Robert Koch, who was a frequent guest on his research trips. From July 1897 to May 1898, he undertook research in the hospital's bacteriological laboratory, mainly on malaria, but also on Surra and Texas fever, two animal diseases. From January 1905 onwards, he worked on African sleeping sickness and East Coast fever for several months. Gustav Giemsa, working on the diagnosis of malaria and other parasital diseases, was the government pharmacist in Dar es Salaam at the time, and Robert Kudicke was the first pathologist at the hospital from 1908 onwards.

After the First World War, the British colonial government continued the former restriction of serving the European communities only at the hospital. Following independence of Tanganyika in 1961, the hospital was renamed Ocean Road Hospital, and all racial restrictions were removed. During the 1960s and '70s, it was used as the maternity wing of Muhimbili Medical Centre. In 1980, the facility was converted into a cancer treatment unit. The radiotherapy unit of the Faculty of Medicine, University of Dar es Salaam, was shifted from Muhimbili Medical Centre to the Ocean Road Hospital. In June 1996, Ocean Road Hospital was made an autonomous institute directly under the Tanzania Ministry of Health and Social Welfare and its name changed to Ocean Road Cancer Institute.

== Historical architecture ==
The conspicuous building in the "Arabian style" was erected in a park directly on the Indian Ocean according to plans by the German engineer August Wißkow. It was opened on October 1, 1897, with only one wing. Owing to financial restrictions, the second wing planned right from the beginning was only completed in 1899. In addition to the main building, there were separate fever barracks for malaria patients and buildings for maintenance and the kitchens. Medical and administrative staff lived in a separate building.

The building is dominated by two water towers, whose octagonal domes are each crowned with a star. Water was provided by a well and cisterns on the roofs. For the purpose of natural air conditioning, sickrooms were oriented towards the sea, and rooms exposed to direct sunlight were shaded by verandas. The entire building was protected by mosquito screens. A third wing was added under British administration 50 years after the opening and in the 1990s, the complete building was renovated with funds from the Federal Republic of Germany.

Along with the Azania Front Lutheran Church, built between 1899 and 1902, and the Roman Catholic St. Joseph's Cathedral, constructed between 1897 and 1902, Ocean Road Hospital belongs to a number of early historical buildings in Dar es Salaam.

== Modern times ==
Today, the Ocean Road Cancer Institute is an oncology treatment, research and education center affiliated with the Muhimbili University of Health and Allied Sciences as a teaching hospital. With a total capacity of 256 beds, a corresponding number of patients are treated there. Viral diseases such as hepatitis B and HIV/AIDS are also studied and treated at the Ocean Road Cancer Institute.

Photographs of the hospital in 1906

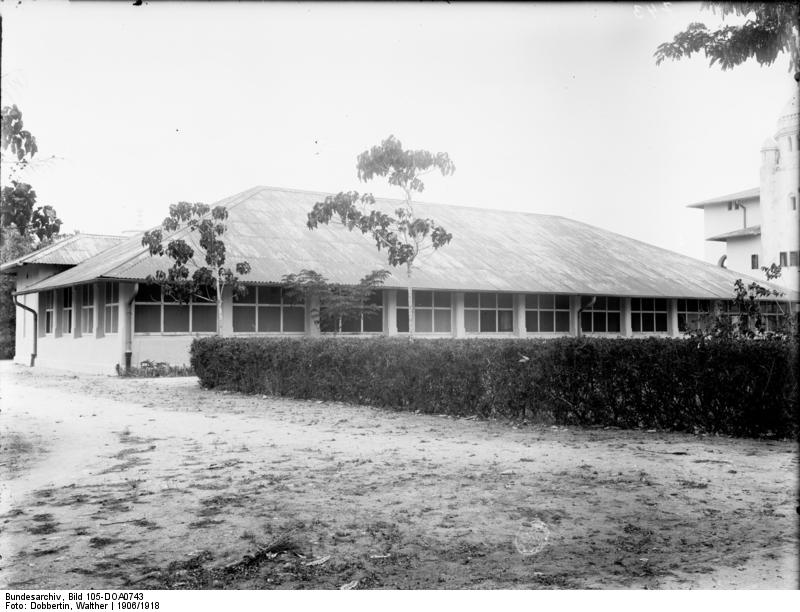
Fever barracks

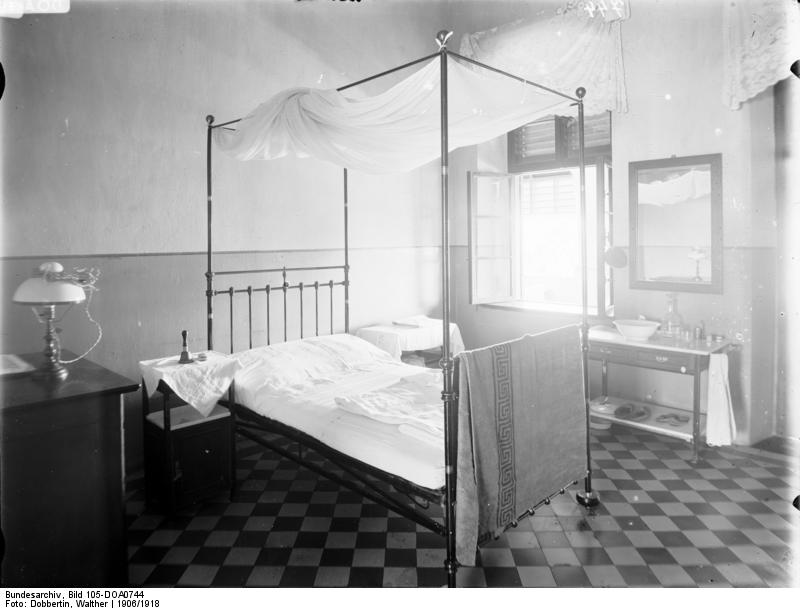
Patients' room

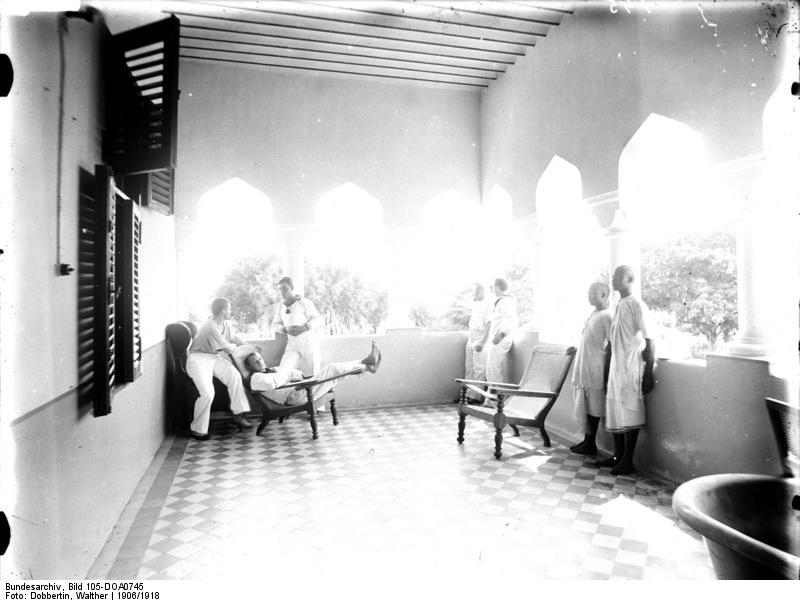
Veranda

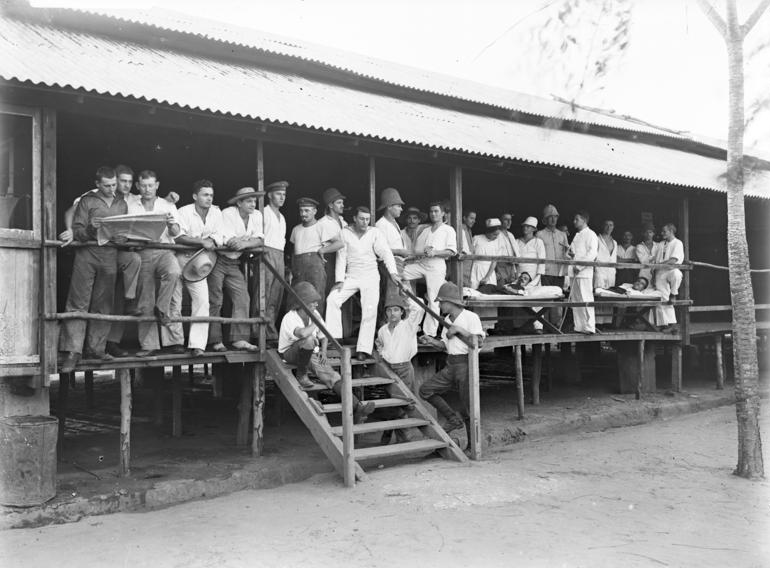
German colonial staff
