= Benjamin Mkapa Hospital =

Hospital in Dodoma, Tanzania

Geography
- Location: Dodoma, Tanzania
- Coordinates: Landmark 6.229805°S 35.847491°E

Organisation
- Type: General

Services
- Beds: 400

History
- Opened: 2015

Links
- Website: bmh.or.tz

The Benjamin Mkapa Hospital is a tertiary public hospital in Dodoma, the capital city of Tanzania. It was the second hospital in the country to perform kidney transplants but the first to do so with an entire Tanzanian staff in 2018.

== Services ==
- specialist services
- Kidney transplant
- Brain surgery
- cardiology
- Bone marrow

== Director ==
The Executive Director of Benjamin Mkapa Hospital (BMH), is Prof Abel Makubi. He was appointed by President on 4 June 2024, succeeding Dr. Alphonce Chandika after he completed his tenure.

The board of trustee of the hospital is inaugurated in April 2026 by the minister of health.
