= Bagrationovsky District =

Bagrationovsky District Багратионовский район (Russian)
- District
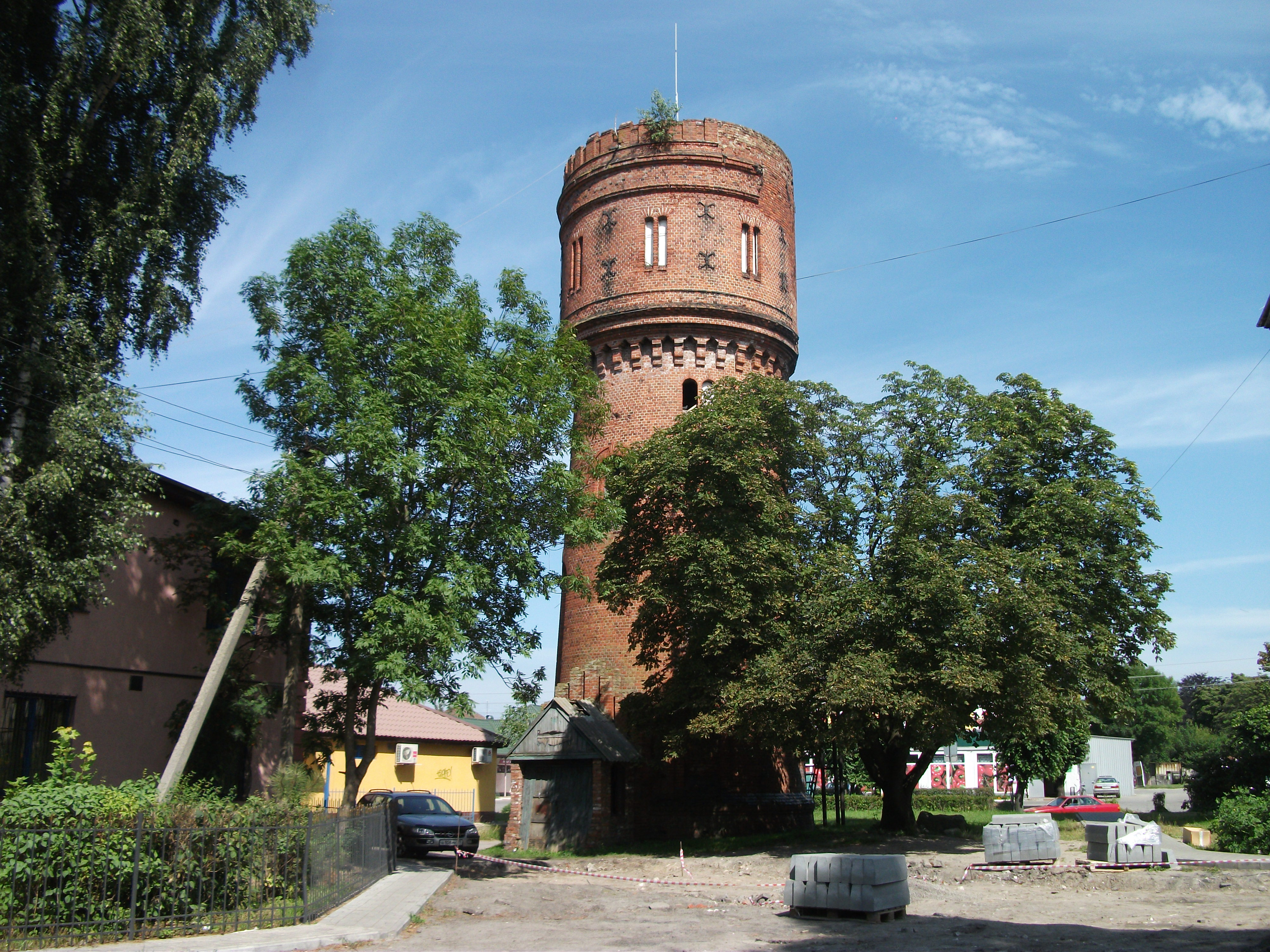
- Water Tower, Mamonovo, Bagrationovsky District

- Flag Coat of arms
- Location of Bagrationovsky District in Kaliningrad Oblast
- Coordinates: 54°33′N 20°23′E
- Country: Russia
- Federal subject: Kaliningrad Oblast
- Established: 1946
- Administrative center: Bagrationovsk

Area
  - Total: 1,146 km^{2} (442 sq mi)

Population (2010 Census)
  - Total: 32,352
  - Density: 28.23/km^{2} (73.12/sq mi)
  - Urban: 19.8%
  - Rural: 80.2%

Administrative structure
  - Administrative divisions: 1 Towns of district significance, 4 Rural okrugs
  - Inhabited localities: 1 cities/towns, 87 rural localities

Municipal structure
  - Municipally incorporated as: Bagrationovsky Municipal District
  - Municipal divisions: 1 urban settlements, 4 rural settlements
- Website: https://bagrationovsk-mo.ru/

Bagrationovsky District (Russian: Багратио́новский райо́н) is an administrative district (raion), one of the fifteen in Kaliningrad Oblast, Russia. As a municipal division, it is incorporated as Bagrationovsky Municipal District. It is located in the southwest of the oblast. The area of the district is 1,146 square kilometers (442 sq mi). Its administrative center is the town of Bagrationovsk. Population: 32,352 (2010 census); 45,672 (2002 Census); 39,724 (1989 Soviet census). The population of Bagrationovsk accounts for 19.8% of the district's total population.

== Geography ==
The district is one of the westernmost in Kaliningrad Oblast. It is situated south of Kaliningrad at the border with Poland and is sparsely populated.

The former Prussian Eastern Railway runs through the district along the Baltic coast, connecting the city of Kaliningrad with Gdańsk in Poland. Another line, the former East Prussian Southern Railway, connects Kaliningrad with Polish Bartoszyce via Bagrationovsk; however, passenger service was discontinued in 2011. Two major roads, the R516 (part of the former Berlinka autobahn) and the A195, also lead through Bagrationovsky District to the Polish border.

The most important river in the district is the Prokhladnaya, which mouths into Vistula Lagoon.

== Partnerships ==
The district is in partnership with Verden District in Lower Saxony, Germany.
