= List of inhabited localities in Kaliningrad Oblast =

Human settlements in the Russian exclave

This is a list of currently and formerly inhabited localities in the Kaliningrad Oblast, Russia, with their former names, where available, in German, Polish, and Lithuanian. After the northern half of the former German region of East Prussia was annexed to the Soviet Union as an exclave of the Russian SFSR in 1945, nearly all the old toponyms of German, Lithuanian, Polish and Old Prussian origin were changed to new Russian ones.

== Cities and towns ==
English	Russian after 1946	Russian prior to 1946	German	Polish	Lithuanian	Population
Bagrationovsk	Багратионовск		Preußisch Eylau	Iławka; Pruska Iława	Prusų Yluva	6,400
Baltiysk	Балтийск	Пиллау	Pillau	Piława	Piliava	33,317
Chernyakhovsk	Черняховск	Инстербург	Insterburg	Wystruć	Įsrutis	35,888
Guryevsk	Гурьевск		Neuhausen	Romnowo/Nowotki	Noihauzenas	19,670
Gusev	Гусев	Гумбиннен	Gumbinnen	Gąbin	Gumbinė	28,260
Gvardeysk	Гвардейск		Tapiau	Tapiawa/Tapiewo	Tepliava/Tepliuva	13,353
Kaliningrad	Калининград	Кёнигсберг, Королевец	Königsberg	Królewiec	Karaliaučius	475,056
Krasnoznamensk	Краснознаменск		Lasdehnen, 1938–1946 Haselberg	Łoździenie; Lasdeny	Lazdėnai	3,522
Ladushkin	Ладушкин		Ludwigsort	Ludwikowo	Balga	3,787
Mamonovo	Мамоново		Heiligenbeil	Święta Siekierka; Świętomiejsce	Šventapilis	7,761
Neman	Неман		Ragnit	Ragneta	Ragainė	11,798
Nesterov	Нестеров		Stallupönen/Ebenrode	Stołupiany	Stalupėnai	4,595
Ozyorsk	Озёрск		Darkehmen/Angerapp	Darkiejmy	Darkiemis	4,740
Pionersky	Пионерский		Neukuhren	Kurowo	Naujieji Kuršiai	11,633
Polessk	Полесск		Labiau	Labiawa	Labguva	7,581
Pravdinsk	Правдинск		Friedland	Frydląd	Romuva	4,323
Primorsk	Приморск		Fischhausen	Rybaki	Žuvininkai	1,956
Slavsk	Славск		Heinrichswalde	Jędrzychowo	Gastos	4,614
Sovetsk	Советск	Тильзит	Tilsit	Tylża	Tilžė	39,752
Svetlogorsk	Светлогорск		Rauschen	Rausze	Riaušiai	16,099
Svetly	Светлый	Циммербуде	Zimmerbude	Buda	Cimerbūdė	21,928
Zelenogradsk	Зеленоградск		Cranz	Koronowo	Krantas	17,296

== Other localities ==
Places that are no longer inhabited are marked with a dagger ("†").

English	Russian	German	Polish	Lithuanian	Notes
Abelino	Абелино	Adamsheide	Adamowo		
Abluchye	Аблучье	Kurkenfeld	Kurkowo	Kurkenfeldas	
Abramovo	Абрамово	Klein Rudminnen, 1938–1946: Kleinruden, along with Dickschen, 1938–1946 Lindbach		Žirnupiai	
Aistovo	Аистово	Kondehnen, Kreis Königsberg/Samland			
Aisty†	Аисты	Neuhof-Reatischken, 1938–1946 Budeweg		Revatiškiai	
Aksakovo†	Аксаково	Maßwillen		Mažviliai	
Aksyonovo†	Аксёново	Dorotheenhof, Kreis Preußisch Eylau			
Akulovo	Акулово	Klein Neuhof-Ragnit		Ragainės Naujadvaris	
Alexandra Kosmo- demyanskogo, Imeni	Имени Александра; Космодемьянского	Metgethen			
Alexandrovka	Александровка	Alexen, 1930–1946 Grotfeld		Aleksai	
Alexandrovka	Александровка	Posselau			
Alexandrovskoye†	Александровское	Bomben			since 1993 along with Robitten
Alexeyevka	Алексеевка	Klein Kackschen, 1938–1946 Kleinbirkenhain		Mažieji Kakšiai	
Alexeyevka	Алексеевка	Auschlacken			
Altayskoye	Алтайское	Schulkeim			
Alyabyevo†	Алябьево	Bersteningken, 1938–1946 Berstenau			
Alyokhino	Алёхино	Naukritten			
Alyoshkino	Алёшкино	Albrechtau	Olbrachtowo		
Andreyevka	Андреевка	Klein Schwentischken, 1938–1946 Kleinschanzenort	Świętyszki Małe; Małe Święciszki	Šventiškės	
Anechkino	Анечкино	Wilditten			
Antonovka	Антоновка	Adamischken			
Antonovka	Антоновка	Brasdorf			
Antonovo	Антоново	Grünwalde, Kreis Bartenstein			
Aprelevka	Апрелевка	Wargienen, Kreis Königsberg/Samland			
Aralskoye	Аральское	Alexwangen			
Armeyskoye†	Армейское	Ackerau			
Artyomovka	Артёмовка	Argeningken-Graudszen, 1938–1946 Argenhof, along with Skambracken, 1938–1946 Brakenau		Argininkai; Skambrakai	
Avangardnoye	Авангардное	Bulitten			
Avgustovka	Августовка	Drangsitten, Graventhien and Johnken	Drąsyty		
Ayvazovskoye	Айвазовское	Trausen, Forsthaus			
Azovskoye	Азовское	Thiemsdorf, Kreis Labiau			
Babushkino	Бабушкино	Groß Degesen		Didieji Degėsiai	
Bagrationovo	Багратионово	Wikischken, 1938–1946 Wiecken	Wikiszki	Vykiškiai	
Balga	Бальга	Balga (castle)	Bałga		
Baltiyskoye†	Балтийское	Deutsch Bahnau (until 1920: Polnisch Bahnau)			
Bareyevka	Бареевка	Blendowen 1938–1945 Blendau	Błędowo		
Barkasovo	Баркасово	Neu Katzkeim			
Barsukovka	Барсуковка	Duhnau and Legehnen		Dunava & Legėnai	
Barsukovka	Барсуковка	Bartukeiten, 1938–1946 Bartenhöh		Bartukaičiai	
Bayevka	Баевка	Kuikeim			
Belabino	Белабино	Szidlack/Schidlack, 1938–1946 Schiedelau			
Belinskoye	Белинское	Abellienen, 1938–1946 Ilmenhagen			
Belinskoye†	Белинское	Kaszemeken/Kaschemeken 1938–1946 Kaschen	Kaszewo		
Belkino	Белкино	Groß Wersmeningken, 1938–1946; Langenfelde	Wielkie Wersmeninki	Didieji Versmininkai	
Belkino	Белкино	Abelischken, 1938–1946 Ilmenhorst	Abeliszki	Belkinas	
Belomorskoye†	Беломорское	Wittgirren, 1938–1946 Wittern			
Belomorskoye	Беломорское	Groß Friedrichsgraben I, 1918–1946 Hindenburg			
Belovo	Белово	Perpolken		Perpulkos	
Bely Yar	Белый Яр	Eiserwagen		Isrovajos	
Beregovoye	Береговое	Patersort		Beregovojė	
Beregovoye	Береговое	Tenkitten		Tenkytai	
Beregovoye†	Береговое	Eisseln			
Berezhki†	Бережки	Budszedehlen, 1936–1938 Budschedehlen; 1938–1946 Salzburgerhütte	Budziele		
Berezhki†	Бережки	Plaustendorf			
Berezhkovskoye	Бережковское	Groß Bubainen, 1928–1946 Waldhausen		(Didieji) Bubainiai	
Beryozovka	Берёзовка	Genditten, Groß Sausgarten, Kniepitten, Naunienen, Perkuiken, Pieskeim, Sossehnen and Tollkeim			
Beryozovka†	Берёзовка	Grünwiese			
Beryozovka	Берёзовка	Schugsten			
Beryozovka	Берёзовка	Groß Ottenhagen			
Beryozovka	Берёзовка				
Beryozovka	Берёзовка	Geidlauken (1938–1946 Heiligenhain), Burgsdorf, Friedrichsfelde, Kreis Labiau, Petruschkehmen, 1938–1946 Kleinburgsdorf and Schönwalde, Kreis Labiau		Geidlaukiai & Petruškiemis	
Beryozovo	Берёзово	Schönbaum			
Bezymyanka	Безымянка	Nuskern			
Blizhneye	Ближнее	Klein Elxnupönen, 1938–1946 Kleinerlenfließ		Mažieji Elksnupėnai	
Bobrovo	Боброво	Groß Rudminnen, 1938 until 1946 Wietzheim, along with Ellernthal as well as Königshuld II		Didieji Rūdminiai	
Bobrovo	Боброво	Kobbelbude, Kreis Fischhausen/Samland			
Bobry	Бобры	Schwirblienen, 1938–1946 Mühlenhöh			
Bogatoye	Богатое	Pokalkstein			
Bogatovo	Богатово	Rositten and Bornehnen	Rosity and Burniny	Rasytė	
Bogatovo	Богатово	Szargillen, 1936–1938 Schargillen, 1938–1946; Eichenrode		Žargiliai	
Bogatovo†	Богатово	Matzkahlen			
Bogdanovka	Богдановка	Jürkendorf and Gnadenthal		Gnadentalis & Jurkai	
Bogdanovo	Богданово	Emmahof			
Bolotnikovo	Болотниково	Szameitkehmen/Schameitkehmen, Kreis Pillkallen, 1938–1946: Lindenhaus, Kreis Schloßberg		Žemaitkiemiai	
Bolshakovo	Большаково	Groß Skaisgirren, 1938–1946 Kreuzingen	Skajzgiry	Skaistgiriai; Didieji Skaisgiriai	
Bolshakovo†	Большаково	Groß Mixeln			
Bolshakovskoye	Большаковское	Leidtkeim			
Bolshaya Derevnya	Большая Деревня	Dunkershöfen			since 2008: Bolshoye Derevenskoye (Большое Деревенское)
Bolshaya Polyana	Большая Поляна	Paterswalde		Petragirė	
Bolshedorozhnoye	Большедорожное	Laukitten, along with Dagwitten, Julienhof, Kreis Heiligenbeil and Kopainen		Laukyčiai, Degviečiai & Kapainis	
Bolshiye Berezhki	Большие Бережки	Alt Lappienen, 1938–1946 Rauterskirch	Stare Lapiny	Lapynai	
Bolshiye Gorki	Большие Горки	Groß Weißensee			
Bolshoye Derevenskoye	Большое Деревенское	Dunkershöfen			
Bolshoye Isakovo	Большое Исаково	Lauth			
Bolshoye Ozyornoye	Большое Озёрное	Klein Sausgarten			
Bolshoye Selo	Большое Село	Unter Eißeln, 1938–1946 Untereißeln			
Borisovo	Борисово	Kraussen			
Borodino	Бородино	Barraginn, 1938–1946 Georgenhain	Baragin	Baraginė	
Borok	Борок	Grasgirren, 1938–1946 Dingelau			
Borovikovo	Боровиково	Szinkuhnen/Schinkuhnen, 1938–1946 Schenkenhagen		Šinkūnai	
Borovoye	Боровое	Bekarten, Melonkeim and Rohrmühle	Dębowina, Miliki and Trzciniec		
Borovoye	Боровое	Skirwieth, 1938–1946 Skirwiet	Skirwit	Skirvytė	
Borskoye	Борское	Schiewenau			
Botkino	Боткино	Beyershof			
Bochagi	Бочаги	Schloßberg, Kreis Insterburg			
Brigadnoye	Бригадное	Theut, Christoplacken and Zanderlacken		Tuitai	
Bruski†	Бруски	Louisenthal			
Bryanskoye	Брянское	Pruszischken, 1935–1946 Preußendorf		Prūsiškiai	
Bugrino	Бугрино	Charlottenhof, Kreis Königsberg			
Bukhovo	Бухово	Buchhof (until 1918: Juckeln)		Jukeliai	
Bulavino	Булaвино	Uszupönen, 1938–1945 Grundfeld	Użupiany	Užupėnai	
Bychkovo	Бычково	Kaydann	Kajdany	Kaidanas	
Bystryanka	Быстрянка				
Chaadayevo	Чаадаево	Brolost			
Chapayevo	Чапаево	Prappeln			
Chapayevo	Чапаево	Schlauthienen, Grundfeld and Jerlauken	Grędzina and Gierławki	Šliautynai	
Chapayevo†	Чапаево	Tuszainen, 1928–1946 Tussainen			
Chapayevo	Чапаево	Wabbeln, Kreis Stallupönen/Ebenrode	Wabele	Upeliai	
Chaykino	Чайкино	Rinau			
Chaykino	Чайкино	Rauschen, Kreis Gerdauen			
Chaykovskoye	Чайковское	Lugowen, 1938–1946 Großlugau	Ługowo	Lugava, Lygawa	
Chaykovskoye	Чайковское	Kalgen			
Chekhovo	Чехово	Uderwangen	Wydry	Udravangis	
Cheremkhovo	Черемхово	Dossitten			
Cherepanovo	Черепаново	Reichau			
Cherepanovo	Черепаново	(Adlig) Powayen			
Cherkasovo†	Черкасово	Ober Blankenau			
Chernyakhovo	Черняхово	Laukupönen, 1938–1946 Erlenhagen		Laukupėnai	
Chernyshevka	Чернышевка	Groß Beynuhnen, 1938–1946 Großbeinuhnen	Bejnuny Wielkie		
Chernyshevo	Чернышево	Bublauken, 1938–1946 Argenfurt		Bublaukiai	since 1993: Novokolkhoznoye (Новоколхозное)
Chernyshevskoye	Чернышевское	Eydtkuhnen, 1938–46 Eydtkau	Ejtkuny	Eitkūnai	
Cheryomukhino	Черёмухино	Karlshof, Kreis Fischhausen			
Cheryomukhovo	Черёмухино	Groß Klitten			
Chistopolye	Чистополье	Jodszinn/Jodschinn, 1938–1946 Sausreppen	Dawidowo	Juodžynai	
Chistopolye	Чистополье	Bothkeim			
Chistopolye†	Чистополье	Klein Obscherningken, 1938–1946 Kleinwalde			
Chistopolye†	Чистополье	Naudwarrischken, 1931–1946 Adelshof			
Chistyye Prudy	Чистые Пруды	Tollmingkehmen, 1938–46 Tollmingen	Tołminkiejmy	Tolminkiemis	
Chkalovo	Чкалово	Enzuhnen, 1938–1946 Rodebach		Enciūnai	
Dachnoye	Дачное	Alt Lappönen		Lapėnai	
Dachnoye†	Дачное	Birkenberg			
Dalneye†	Дальнее	Szirgupönen, 1936–1938 Schirgupönen, 1938–1946 Amtshagen		Žirgupėnai	
Dalneye	Дальнее	(Groß) Schirrau			
Dalneye	Дальнее	Seligenfeld			
Dalneye	Дальнее	Bittkallen, 1938–1946 Bitterfelde, along with Paschwentschen, 1938–1946 Wittenrode		Bitkalniai	
Dalneye†	Дальнее	Pettkuhnen			
Dalneye	Дальнее	Wommen			
Darvino, Rayon Gusev	Дарвино	Luschen			now: Furmanovo (Фурманово)
Darvino, Rayon; Krasnoznamensk†	Дарвино	Droszwalde/Drozwalde			
Demidovka	Демидовка	Menkimmen, 1938–1946 Menken	Mękinie		
Demidovo	Демидово	Augstupöhnen, 1938–1946 Uderhöhe, and Groß Uderballen, 1938–1946 Großudertal		Ūdrabaliai & Aukštupėnai	
Demyanovka†	Демьяновка	Groß Engelau			
Derzhavino	Державино	Groß Laßeningken, 1936–1938 Groß Lascheningken, 1938–1939 Groß Laschnicken, 1939–1946 Laschnicken		Lašininkkai	
Desantnoye	Десантное				
Detskoye	Детское	Götzendorf, Kreis Wehlau			
Detskoye	Детское	Kinderweitschen, 1938–1946 Kinderhausen		Kindervietė	
Dimitrovo	Димитрово	Ponarth and Schönbusch			
Divnoye	Дивное	Neuendorf, Kreis Fischhausen		Naujakiemis	
Divnoye	Дивное	Alt Ilischken		Yliškiai	
Divnoye	Дивное	Bahnhof Trakehnen		Trakėnai	
Dmitriyevka	Дмитриевка	Iszlaudszen, 1934–1946 Schönheide	Iszłauże	Išlaužiai	
Dneprovskoye†	Днепровское	Friedrichsruh, Kreis Wehlau			
Dneprovskoye†	Днепровское	Lonschken			
Dobrino	Добрино	Nautzken		Nauckai	
Dobroye	Доброе	(Groß) Legden			
Dobroye	Доброе	Preußisch Battau			amalgamated since 1993 with Svetlogorsk
Dobrovolsk	Добровольск	Pillkallen, 1938–46 Schloßberg	Pilkały	Pilkalnis	
Dokuchayevo	Докучаево	Samonienen, 1938–1946 Reiterhof		Samanynai	
Dolgorukovo	Долгоруково	Domtau, Leißen, Pompicken, Stablack and Waldkeim	Domatowo		
Dolgoye	Долгое	Beinigkehmen, 1938–1946 Beinicken		Beininkaimis	
Dolzhanskoye	Должанское	Budupönen-Uthelen, 1931–1946 Hartigsberg		Būdupėnai Uteliai	
Domnovo	Домново	Domnau	Domnowo	Dumnava	
Donskoye	Донское	Elkinehlen, 1938–1946 Elken	Elkinele	Elkinėliai	
Donskoye	Донское	Groß Dirschkeim	Tryszkajmy	Diržkaimis	
Donskoye†	Донское	Dothen, along with Schengels, Adlig Gedau			
Donskoye†	Донское	Karolinen			
Dorozhnoye	Дорожное	Altenberg			
Dorozhnoye	Дорожное	Kaspershöfen			
Dorozhnoye†	Дорожное	Schunkarinn, 1938–1946 Schlieben			
Dorozhnyy	Дорожный	Sandlauken, Kreis Königsberg/Samland			
Dorozhnyy†	Дорожный	Papuschienen, Kreis Insterburg, 1929–1946 Tannenfelde			
Dovatorovka	Доваторовка	Leipeningken, 1928–1946 Georgental, and Zwion	Lipnik	Liepininkai	
Druzhba	Дружба	Allenburg	Alberga; Alembork	Alna	
Druzhba	Дружба	Kirschappen, Kreis Fischhausen/Samland			
Druzhnoye	Дружное	Rüdlauken, 1938–1946 Rothöfen		Rudlaukis	
Druzhnoye	Дружное	Mednicken			
Dubki	Дубки	Neucken	Nojki		
Dubki†	Дубки	Charlottenthal, Kreis Heiligenbeil		Dubkai	
Dubki	Дубки	Paskallwen, 1938–1946 Schalau		Paskalviai	
Dublinino	Дублинино	Doblienen		Doblynai, Dobilynai	
Dubovaya Roshcha	Дубовая Роща	Ballupönen, 1938–1946 Wittigshöfen	Błotno	Balupėnai	
Dubrava	Дубрава	Buylien, 1938–1946 Schulzenwalde	Bujle		
Dubrava	Дубрава	Korreynen			
Dubravino	Дубравино	Palentienen, 1938–1946 Palen		Palentynai	
Dubrovka	Дубровка	Görken, Klaussen and Pilzen	Gierki, Klusy and Piłsedy		
Dubrovka	Дубровка	Drutschlauken, 1938–1946 Hasenfeld	Druczlauki		
Dubrovka	Дубровка	Regehnen			
Dubrovka	Дубровка	Spannegeln		Spanėgai & Spanėgėliai	
Duminichi	Думиничи	Giggarn, 1938–1946 Girren		Gygarai	
Dunayskoye	Дунайское	Alt Wingeruppen, 1938–1946 Windungen as well as Czuppen, 1938 until 1946 Schuppen,			now: Sorokino (Сорокино)
Dunayevka†	Дунаевка	Thierenberg			
Dunayevka	Дунаевка	Ganderkehmen			now: Proletarskoye (Пролетарское)
Dunayevka†	Дунаевка	Kiaulkehmen, 1935–1946 Jungort		Kiaulkiemis	
Dvinskoye	Двинское	Warkallen, 1938–1946 Roloffseck		Varkalai	
Dvoriki	Дворики	Klein Dirschkeim			
Dvoriki†	Дворики	Jodszen/Jodschen, 1938–1946 Schwarzenau			
Dvorki	Дворки	Rogahnen		Rogainys	
Dvorkino	Дворкино	Friedenberg	Rochowo		
Dyatlovo†	Дятлово	Neu Wingeruppen, 1928–1946 Neuweide			
Dzerzhinskoye	Дзержинское	Gowarten		Govartai	
Dzerzhinskoye†	Дзержинское	Jogelehnen, 1938–1946 Jürgendorf			
Fadeyevo	Фадеево	Schunwillen, 1938–1946 Argenau		Šunvilai	
Fedotovo	Федотово	(Groß) Plauen	Pławno Wielkie		
Fevralskoye	Февральское	Spullen, along with Bludszen/Bludschen, 1938–1946 Vierhöfen	Szpule	Spuliai	
Fevralskoye	Февральское	Groß Kirschnakeim, 1938–1946 Kirschkeim, along with Klein Kirschnakeim, 1938–1946 Kleinschanzkrug, along with Dwielen, 1938–1946 Meißnershof			
Filino	Филино	Klein Kuhren			
Filippovka	Филипповка	Philippsthal	Filipki		
Filippovka	Филипповка	Dommelkeim			
Frunzenskoye	Фрунзенское	Bokellen	Bakuły		
Furmanovka	Фурмановка	Alt Kattenau, 1928–1946 Neu Trakehnen		Senoji Katniava	
Furmanovka	Фурмановка	Friedrichsburg, Kreis Labiau			
Furmanovo†	Фурманово	Klein Dexen, Schlawitten and Wonditten	Deksnie Małe, Sławity and Wądyty		
Furmanovo	Фурманово	Stannaitschen, 1938–1946 Zweilinden, along with Luschen	Stonajcie	Stanaičiai	
Fyodorovo	Фёдорово	Maldaiten		Maldaičiai	
Ganino†	Ганино	Gnottau		Gnytuva	
Gannovka	Ганновка	Gerskullen, 1938–1946 Gerslinden		Gerskuliai	
Garino	Гарино	Ober Eißeln, 1938–1946 Obereißeln, now: Gorino (Горино)			
Gastellovo	Гастеллово	Groß Friedrichsdorf		Metežerynai	
Gavrilovka	Гавриловка	Schardeningken, 1938–1946 Schardingen	Żardeniki	Žardininkai	
Gavrilovo	Гаврилово	Gawaiten, 1938–1946 Herzogsrode	Gawajty	Gavaičiai	
Gayevo	Гаево	Kropiens			
Gayevo†	Гаево	Rödszen/Rödschen, 1938–1946 Röden			
Georgiyevskoye	Георгиевское	Konradshorst			
Geroyskoye†	Геройское	Goythenen		Gaitainys	
Gerzeno†	Герцено	Gnädtken	Gniadkowo		
Glushkovo	Глушково	Plibischken		Plybiškė	
Gogolevo	Гоголево	Kopainen		Kapainys	
Gogolevskoye	Гоголевское	Althof, Kreis Gerdauen	Starydwór		
Gogolevskoye	Гоголевское	Lenkehlischken 1938–1945 Gutbergen		Lenkeliškiai	
Golovkino	Головкино	Nemonien, 1938–1946 Elchwerder	Niemenica; Niemienica	Nemanynas	
Golubevo	Голубево	Seepothen		Sepočiai	
Goncharovo	Гончарово	Groß Saalau			
Gorbatovka	Горбатовка	Nortycken		Nortikiai	
Gordoye	Гордое	Bürgersdorf		Biurgersdorfas	
Gorino	Горино	Ober Eißeln, 1938–1946 Obereißeln		Eisuliai, Matiškiai	
Gorki†	Горки	Albehnen			
Gorkovskiy†	Горьковский	Perwilten		Perviltai	
Gorkovskoye	Горьковское	Watzum (until 1902: Wartnicken)		Vartnikai	
Gorlovka	Горловка	Bollgehnen		Balgėnai	
Gorodkovo	Городково	Skören		Skėriai	
Gorokhovo	Горохово	Sprittlauken		Spritlaukis	
Govorovo	Говорово	Blausden, 1938 until 1946 Blauden		Blauzdai	
Grachyovka	Грачёвка	Kraam		Kramava	
Grachyovo†	Грачёво	Neusasserei, along with Neusaß I and Neusaß II			
Grebnoye	Гребное	Grünhagen			
Gremyachye	Гремячье	Groß Berschkallen, 1938–1946 Birken	Berżkale	Beržkalnis	
Gribki	Грибки	Langhöfel		Langhefelis	
Griboyedovo	Грибоедово	Wanghusen		Vangučiai	
Griboyedovo†	Грибоедово	Kallwellen, 1938–1946 Torffelde			
Grigoryevka	Григорьевка	Sprindlack, Groß Birkenfelde, Groß Balzerischken (1938–1946 Balzershof and Rathsgrenz)		Sprindlaukiai & Balceriškiai	
Grigoryevo	Григорьево	Kissitten, Kreis Preußisch Eylau			since 1993: Poberezhye (Побережье)
Grigoryevo	Григорьево	Willkischken			since 1993: Novokolkhoznoye (Новоколхозное)
Grivino	Гривино	Girrehnen, 1938–1946 Güldengrund, as well as Meschken, 1938–1946 Meschenhof		Girėnai, Meškiai	
Gromovo, Rayon; Bagrationovsk†	Громово	Storkeim			
Gromovo, Rayon Slavsk	Громово	Lauknen, 1938–1946 Hohenbruch (Ostpreußen)	Laukny	Lauknos	
Grosnoye†	Грозное	Tilsewischken 1938–1945 Tilsenberg		Tilževiškiai	
Grushevka, Rayon; Bagrationovsk†	Грушевка	Seeben			
Grushevka, Rayon Gusev†	Грушевка	Wilkoschen, 1938–1946 Wolfseck			
Grushevka	Грушевка	Sommerfeld			
Grushevka	Грушевка	Groß Perbangen		Perbangis	
Grushevka, Rayon Slavsk†	Грушевка	Schenkendorf			
Gudkovo	Гудково	Gudgallen, 1938–1946 Großfelde, along with Jonienen, 1938–1946 Tilsenau		Gudgaliai, Jonynai	
Gusevka	Гусевка	Drugthenen			
Gusevo†	Гусево	Groß Park			
Gusevo	Гусево	Groß Gnie	Gnie	Gusevas	
Gusevo	Гусево	Dorben			
Gvardeyskoye	Гвардейское	Mühlhausen, Kreis Preußisch Eylau			
Ignatovo	Игнатово	Gaistauden		Gaištautai	
Illovayskoye	Илловайское	Jucknaten, 1938–1946 Meißnersrode, along with Lubinehlen, 1938–1946 Lubenwalde		Juknaičiai, Lubinėliai	
Ilyichyovka	Ильичёвка	Lank		Lankas	
Ilyichyovo	Ильичёво	Görken, Kreis Königsberg/Samland			
Ilyino	Ильино	Bumbeln		Bumbulai	
Ilyinskoye	Ильинское	Kassuben	Kaszuby	Košūbai	
Ilyushino	Илюшино	Milluhnen, 1938–1946 Mühlengarten	Milunie	Miliūnai	
Ilyushino	Илюшино	Bönkeim and Johannisberg			
Instruch	Инструч	Inster (river)			
Irkutskoye	Иркутское	Plöstwehnen			
Irtyshskoye†	Иртышское	Eszerischken, 1938–1945 Schönfels	Eszeryszki		
Iskra	Искра	Kindschen, 1928–1946 Groß Kindschen		Kinčiai	
Iskrovo	Искрово	Plattupönen, 1938–1946 Breitflur		Platupėnai	
Iskrovo	Искрово	Ringels			
Istok	Исток	Neu Weynothen, 1938–1946 Preußenhof		Vainotai	
Istrovka	Истровка	Schaberau and Zargen			
Ivanovka	Ивановка	Adlig-, Groß-, Klein- and Neu Bärwalde, Imbärwalde, Klein Ernstburg and Goltzhausen			
Ivanovka	Ивановка	Nendrinn, 1938–1946 Altlugau		Nendrynas	
Ivantsovo†	Иванцово	Deutsch Thierau		Tyruva	
Ivashevka	Ивашевка	Wallehlischken, 1938–1946 Hagelsberg			now: Mikhaylovo (Михайлово)
Ivashkino	Ивашкино	Kollatischken, 1938–1946 Langenweiler		Kolatiškiai	
Iyulskoye	Июльское	Julienhöhe and Fischer-Taktau		Taktava	
Izhevskoye	Ижевское	Widitten			
Izmaylovo†	Измайлово	Willuhnen			
Izobilnoye	Изобильное	Dedawe, 1938–1946 Deimehöh, along with Klein Fließ and Rathswalde			
Izvilino	Извилино	Dettmitten			
Izvilino	Извилино	Uderballen, 1938–1946 Otterwangen			
Kabanovo	Кабаново	Pelkeninken		Pelkininkai	
Kadymka	Кадымка	Escherningken (Eszerningken), 1938–1946 Eschingen	Eszerninki; Eżerninki	Ešerninkai	
Kalacheyevo	Калачеево	Klein Schillehlen, 1938–1946 Kleinschollen, along with Pötkallen, 1938–1946 Pötken, along with Augskallen, 1938–1946 Güldenflur		Mažieji Šilėnai, Pietkalniai	
Kalinino	Калинино	Mehlkehmen, 1938–1946 Birkenmühle	Melkiejmy	Mielkiemis	
Kalininskoye	Калининское	Augstupönen, Kreis Gumbinnen, 1938–1946 Hochfließ		Aukštupėnai	
Kalinkovo	Калинково	Irglacken			
Kalinovka	Калиновка	Rodmannshöfen			
Kalinovka	Калиновка	Aulowönen, 1938–1946 Aulenbach	Aulowiany; Ulewo	Aulavėnai	
Kalinovo	Калиново	Alt Budupönen, 1938–1946 Altpreußenfelde		Senieji Būdupėnai	
Kalinovo	Калиново	Tolklauken			
Kalmykovo	Калмыково	Heyde, Kreis Preußisch Eylau			
Kaluzhskoye	Калужское	Grünheide, Kreis Insterburg		Gryneidė	
Kamarichi	Камаричи	Stumbern, 1936–1946 Auersfeld	Stąbry		
Kamenka	Каменка	Krücken along with Groß- and Klein Krücken			
Kamenka	Каменка	Friedrichstein			
Kamenka	Каменка	Steinau			
Kamenka†	Каменка	Groß Pentlack, 1928–1946 Pentlack			
Kamenka	Каменка	Michelau			
Kamenskoye	Каменское	Saalau		Želva	
Kamyshevo	Камышево	Graventhien			since 1993: Avgustovka (Августовка)
Kanash	Канаш	Jurgaitschen, 1938–1946 Königskirch	Jurgajcie; Jurki	Jurgaičiai	
Kandiyevo†	Кандиево	Braxeinshof			
Kapustino	Капустино	Lenkutschen, 1938–1946 Schleifenau		Lenkučiai	
Karamyshevo	Карамышево	Pabbeln, Kreis Goldap, 1938–1946 Schardingen	Pobały	Pėpliai	
Karpinskoye	Карпинское	Oscheningken (Oszeningken), 1938–1946 Pfalzrode		Ožininkai	
Karpovka	Карповка	Klein Dumbeln, Kreis Darkehmen, 1938–1946; Kleinkranichfelde	Dumbel	Mažieji Dumbliai	
Kashirskoye	Каширское	Schaaksvitte			
Kashtanovka	Каштановка	Gänsekrug			
Kashtanovka	Каштановка	Eigarren, 1938–1945 Kernhall			
Kashtanovka†	Каштановка	Groß Hohenhagen			
Kashtanovka†	Каштановка	Karalkehmen, 1938–1945 Karlen		Karalkiemis	
Kashtanovka	Каштановка	Mollehnen			
Kashtanovka†	Каштановка	Serpallen, Kreis Preußisch Eylau	Sierpały		
Kashtanovo	Каштаново	Almenhausen, along with Neu Waldeck, Kreis Preußisch Eylau			
Kashtanovo	Каштаново	Schmilgienen, 1938–1946 Kornfelde	Szmilgiany	Smilgynė	
Kaspiyskoye	Каспийское	Wilpischen, Kreis Gumbinnen, 1928–1946 Eichenfeld			
Kazachye†	Казачье	Piontken	Piątki		
Kazakovo†	Казаково	Gerschwillauken	Szyrwałki	Geršvilaukiai	
Kerchenskoye†	Керченское	Unruh			
Khlebnikovo	Хлебниково	Schilleningken, 1938–1946 Ebertann		Šilininkai	
Khlebnikovo†	Хлебниково	Dogehnen			
Khlebnikovo†	Хлебниково	Allenberg			
Kholmogorovka	Холмогоровка	Fuchsberg, Kreis Fischhausen/Samland			
Kholmogorye	Холмогорье	Kipitten			
Kholmogorye	Холмогорье	Peißnick, along with Gneisenau, Mühling, Partsch, and Wisdehlen	Parcz		
Kholmy	Холмы	Adlig Popelken			
Kholmy	Холмы	Mülsen		Milziai	
Kholmy†	Холмы	Schilleningken, Kreis Gumbinnen, 1938–1946; Kaimelskrug			
Khrabrovo	Храброво	Powunden	Powunda	Pavandenė	
Khrustalnoye	Хрустальное	Klein Krauleiden, 1938–1946 Kleinheidenstein		Mažieji Krauleidžiai	
Khutorskoye	Хуторское	Gurdszen (Gurdschen), 1938–1946 Schwichowshof		Gurdžiai	
Kirpichnoye	Кирпичное	Jockeln			
Kiselyovka	Киселёвка	Karschau, Kreis Bartenstein (Friedland)	Karszewo		
Kiyevskoye	Киевское	Schmiedehnen			
Klenovoye	Кленовое	Grüneberg, Kreis Gerdauen			
Klenovoye	Кленовое	Klein Hubnicken			
Klimovka	Климовка	Camanten, 1938–1946 Kamanten			
Klimovka	Климовка	Wicken			
Klimovka†	Климовка	Wilhelmsrode			
Klintsovka	Клинцовка	Wickiau		Vikuva	
Klyuchevoye†	Ключевое	Rambsen			
Klyuchevoye	Ключевое	Raging			
Klyuchi†	Ключи́	Mauenfelde	Dąbrówka		
Klyukvennoye	Клюквенное	Klycken			
Kochkino	Кочкино	Popowken, 1938–1946 Neusobrost	Popówko	Papaukos	
Kochubeyevo	Кочубеево	Agonken, 1936–1946 Altsiedel	Agonki	Agonkai	
Kolkhoznoye	Колхозное	Krauleidszen/Krauleidschen, 1938–1946 Schöppenfelde			
Kolodino†	Колодино	Augustenhof, Kreis Preußisch Eylau			
Kolosovka	Колосовка	Willgaiten and Wiekau		Vileitai & Vikuva	
Kolzovo	Кольцово	Kohlau	Kaława	Kolava	
Komarovo†	Комарово	Groß Haferbeck			
Komsomolsk	Комсомольск	Löwenhagen			
Komsomolskoye	Комсомольское	Schönfließ			
Konevo	Конево	Szameitschen, 1923–1946 Waldhorst			
Konstantinovka†	Константиновка	Eisenbart			
Konstantinovka	Константиновка	Kieselkehmen, 1938–1946 Kieselkeim			
Konstantinovka	Константиновка	Konradswalde, Kreis Königsberg/Samland and Waldhöfen			
Korchagino	Корчагино	Tiedtken			
Kornevo	Корнево	Zinten	Cynty	Žintai, Cintai	
Korolenkovo	Короленково	Oschkin, 1938–1946 Oschern			
Koshelevo	Кошелево	Kaschelen, 1938–1946 Kasseln, as well as Patilszen/Patilschen, 1938–1946 Tilsen		Kašeliai & Patilžė	
Koshevoye	Кошевое	Linken			
Koshevoye	Кошевое	Lisettenfeld			
Kosmodemyanskoye	Космодемьянское	Molsehnen			
Kosa	Коса	Neutief			
Kosatukhino	Косатухино	Barsen and Sollecken		Barsai & Zaliekai	
Kostino	Костино	Stobricken, 1938–1946 Krammsdorf		Stubriukai	
Kostromino	Костромино	Kortmedien as well as Groß Allendorf, Großheim, Grünheim and Neumühl			
Kostrovo	Кострово	Bludau, Kreis Fischhausen			
Kostyukovka	Костюковка	Heyde, Kreis Friedland/Bartenstein			
Kostyukovo	Костюково	Hasseldamm			
Kostyukovo	Костюково	Szillenbruch, 1936– 1945 Schillenbruch			
Kotelnikovo	Котельниково	Wargen			
Kotelnikovo	Котельниково	(Groß) Neuhof-Ragnit		Raganytė, Naujakaimis	
Kovrovo	Коврово	Nautzau		Naucava	
Kozlovka	Козловка (until 2008: Koslovo)	Schanwitz			
Kozlovka	Козловка	Sauskeppen, 1938–1946 Sausen		Sauskepiai	
Kozlovo	Козлово	see: Kozlovka			
Krasnaya Dubrava	Красная Дубрава	Eszerningken/Escherningken, 1938–1946 Gutfließ	Eszerninki	Ežerninkai	
Krasnaya Gorka†	Красная Горка	Grünhayn			
Krasnaya Gorka	Красная Горка	Nettienen		Netynai	
Krasnoarmeyskoye	Красноармейское	Sollau and Kilgis (until 1992: Saretschje)		Zalidava & Kilgis	
Krasnoarmeyskoye†	Красноармейское	Abscherningken, 1938–1946 Dachshausen			
Krasnodonskoye	Краснодонское	Auerswalde and Keimkallen			
Krasnoflotskoye†	Краснофлотское	Rosenberg, Kreis Heiligenbeil			
Krasnoflotskoye	Краснофлотское	Korben			
Krasnogorskoye	Красногорское	Niebudszen/Niebudschen, 1938–1946 Herzogskirch, along with Martischen, 1938–1946 Martinshof	Niebudzie	Nybudžiai	
Krasnokholmskoye	Краснохолмское	Abschruten, Kreis Labiau, 1938–1946 Ehlertfelde		Apšrūtai	
Krasnolesye	Краснолесье	(Groß) Rominten	Rominty Wielkie; Rominty	Raminta	
Krasnooktyabrskoye	Краснооктябрьское	Groß Ponnau	Wielki Ponów	Punavas	
Krasnopartizanskoye†	Краснопартизанское	Ernsthof, Kreis Preußisch Eylau			
Krasnopolyanskoye	Краснополянское	Groß Gaudischkehmen, 1938–1946 Großgauden		Dudysis Gaudiškiemis	
Krasnopolye	Краснополье	Hohenstein, Kreis Friedland/Bartenstein			
Krasnopolye	Краснополье	Sperlings, Kreis Königsberg/Samland			
Krasnopolye	Краснополье	Pötschkehmen, 1934–1946 Pötschwalde		Pėčkiemis	
Krasnorechye†	Красноречье	Kunzen		Kuncai	
Krasnotorovka	Красноторовка	Heiligenkreutz		Kryžiava	
Krasnovka	Красновка	Markehnen			
Krasnovka	Красновка	Birkenfeld			
Krasnoyarskoye	Красноярское	Sodehnen, Kreis Darkehmen/Angerapp	Sodeny; Sodziany	Sodėnai	
Krasnoye	Красное	Wolfsdorf, Kreis Königsberg/Samland			
Krasnoye	Красное	Agilla, 1938–1946 Haffwerder		Agila	
Krasnoye	Красное	(Groß) Astrawischken, 1938–1946 Astrau	Ostrowiszki		
Krasnoye†	Красное	Schöntritten, Kreis Friedland/Bartenstein			
Krasnoye	Красное	Lindicken, Kreis Insterburg		Lindikai	
Krasnoye†	Красное	Lolidimmern, 1938–1946 Lolen			
Krasnoye Selo	Красное Село	Kiauschälen, 1938–1946 Kleinmark, along with Klapaten, 1938–1946 Angerwiese		Klapatai	
Krasnoznamenskoye	Краснознаменское	Dollstädt and Vogelsang			
Krasnoznamenskoye	Краснознаменское	Klein Girratischken, 1935–1946 Gronwalde			
Krasnyy Bor	Красный Бор	Starkenberg			
Krasnyy Bor	Красный Бор	Kellmienen, 1938–1946 Kellmen			
Krasnyy Bor	Красный Бор	Krakau, along with Klein Steindorf, Müllershorst and Peremtienen	Krokowo; Kraków	Krakavas	
Krasnyy Bor†	Красный Бор	Ditthausen			
Krasnyy Log†	Красный Лог	Pallädschen, 1938–1945: Frankeneck	Poledzie	Peledžiai	
Krasnyy Yar	Красный Яр	Parnehnen			
Krayneye	Крайнее	Juckstein, along with Dundeln as well as Pabuduppen, 1938–1946 Finkenhagen		Jukščiai, Dundeliai & Pabudupiai	
Kremnyovo	Кремнёво	Groß Blumenau and Klein Blumenau, Kreis; Fischhausen/Samland			
Krugloye	Круглое	Roßthal			
Kruglovka	Кругловка	Neuendorf, Kreis Wehlau		Navinynai	
Kruglovka	Кругловка	Kurnehnen, 1938–1946 Kurnen	Parszyszki	Kurnėnai	
Kruglovo	Круглово	Polennen			
Krupino†	Крупино	Lawo			
Krupino†	Крупино	Carlswalde			
Krushinino	Крушинино	Kruschinnen, 1938–1946 Altlinde	Kruszyny		
Krutoy Yar	Крутой Яр	Götzlack			
Krylovka	Крыловка	Wischrodt			
Krylovo	Крылово	Nordenburg	Nordenbork	Ašvėnai	
Krymskoye	Крымское	Prätlack			
Kubanovka	Кубановка	Brakupönen, 1938–1946 Roßlinde		Brakupėnai	
Kudrinka	Кудринка	Backeln			
Kudryavtsevo	Кудрявцево	Kuglacken		Kaukalaukis	
Kulikovo	Куликово	Strobjehnen		Strobėnai	
Kulikovo	Куликово	Elchdorf, until 1906: Poyerstieten (bei Wargen)		Pajerstyčiai	
Kumachyovo	Кумачёво	Tropitten			
Kumachyovo	Кумачёво	Kumehnen	Kumeny	Kumėnai	
Kuntsevo	Кунцево	Weßlienen		Vaiselynas	
Kuntsevo†	Кунцево	Grünhof, Kreis Preußisch Eylau			
Kurgan	Курган	Kuxtern			
Kurgany	Курганы	Wachsnicken			
Kurortnoye	Курортное	(Groß) Wohnsdorf, along with Agnesenhof			
Kurortnoye	Курортное	Groß Budlacken		Budlaukiai	
Kustovo	Кустово	Klein Lenkeningken, 1938–1946 Kleinlenkenau		Mažieji Lenkininkai	
Kutuzovo	Кутузово	Schirwindt	Szyrwinta; Szyrwinty	Širvinta	
Kutuzovo	Кутузово	Fräuleinhof		Froileinhofas	
Kutuzovo	Кутузово	Kleschowen (Kleszowen), 1938–1946 Kleschauen	Kleszczewo	Klišiai	
Kuybyshevskoye	Куйбышевское	Petersdorf, Kreis Wehlau		Sudava & Peterkaimiai	
Kuzmino	Кузьмино	Dumbeln, 1938–1946 Kranichfelde and Kurschen			
Kuzmino†	Кузьмино	Kubillehlen, 19938–1946 Freieneck			
Kuznechnoye	Кузнечное	Genditten and Kniepitten			now amalgamated with Beryozovka
Kuznetskoye	Кузнецкое	Backelfeld		Bakai	
Kuznetskoye	Кузнецово	Annaberg			
Ladygino	Ладыгино	Korschenruh			
Ladygino†	Ладыгино	Eszerischken, 1935–1945 Tutteln	Eszeryszki		
Lagernoye	Лагерное	Lenken, Kreis Ragnit/Tilsit-Ragnit		Lenkai	
Laskino	Ласкино	Godrienen			
Lavrovo†	Лаврово	Loschen	Łosie	Lošiai	
Lazarevo	Лазарево	Grüntann			
Lazovskoye	Лазовское	Trömpau			
Leninskoye	Ленинское	Pokraken, 1938–1946 Weidenau		Pakriokiai	
Lermontovo	Лермонтово	Wogau and Boggentin		Vaigava &Bagotynė	
Lermontovo	Лермонтово	Ischdaggen, 1938–1946 Branden		Išdagai	
Lermontovo†	Лермонтово	Leputschen, 1938–1946 Oberschwalben			
Lesenkovo	Лесенково	Plinken		Plinkiai	
Lesistoye	Лесистое	Nassawen	Nosowie; Nasowy	Nasava	
Leskovo	Лесково	Rammonischken, 1938 until 1946 Hagenfließ		Ramoniškiai	
Leskovo	Лесково	Klinthenen, Forsthaus			
Lesnaya†	Лесная	Hollstädt			
Lesnichye	Лесничье	Milchbude, Kreis Darkehmen (Angerapp)	Mleczak	Pienbūdė	
Lesnoy	Лесной	Sarkau	Sarkowo	Šarkuva	
Lesnoy†	Лесной	Wangnicken, Kreis Preußisch Eylau			
Lesnoye	Лесное	Ludwigswalde			
Lesnoye	Лесное	Groß Lenkeningken, 1938–1946 Großlenkenau	Wielkie Lenkeminki	Didieji Lankininkai	
Lesnoye	Лесное				
Lesnoye	Лесное	Warnicken			
Lesnoye	Лесное	Dwarischken, Kreis Insterburg, 1928–1946: Eichenberg	Dworyszki	Dvariškiai	
Levoberezhnoye	Левобережное	Schakuhnen, 1938–1946: Schakendorf	Szakunele	Šakūnai	
Lineynoye	Линейное	Arweiden and Bögen			
Linyovo	Линёво	Schönlinde, Kreis Gerdauen, along with Budwischken, 1938–1946 Oberndorf, Kreis Gerdauen			
Lipki	Липки	Lenkimmen, 1938–1946 Uhlenhorst			
Lipnyaki	Липняки	Trausen (Gut)			
Lipovka	Липовка	Gallingen, Kreis Heiligenbeil, Grünwalde, Kreis; Heiligenbeil and Rosocken			
Lipovka	Липовка	Stenken		Stenikai	
Lipovka	Липовка	Schacken, 1938–1946 Schackenau, along with Guttawutschen		Gutavučiai	
Lipovo	Липово	Kulligkehmen, 1938–1946 Ohldorf		Kulikiemis	
Liski	Лиски	Kingitten			
Liskino	Лискино	Lieskendorf		Liskinas	
Listopadovka	Листопадовка	Bärholz		Berholcas	
Listovoye	Листовое	Woydiethen		Vaidyčiai	
Livenskoye	Ливенское	Galbrasten, 1938–1946 Dreifurt, along with Kragelischken, 1938–1946 Kragelingen	Galbrasty	Galbrasčiai & Krageliškiai	
Livny	Ливны	Stobingen, Kreis Wehlau		Stabingis	
Logvino	Логвино	Medenau	Medenowo; Miedzionowo	Medenava, Medinava	
Lomonosovka	Ломоносовка	Permauern, 1938–1946 Mauern, along with Meyerhof		Pamaurai	
Lomovo	Ломово	Puspern, along with Tublauken, 1938–1946; Schweizersfelde		Pusperiai	
Losevo†	Лосево	Rensegut			
Losevo	Лосево	Rentengut			
Losevo	Лосево	Groß Augstutschen (1930–1946: Rehwalde and Kiauschen (1938–1946 Wetterau)		Didieji Aukštučiai, Kiaušai	
Loshchinka	Лощинка	Uszballen/Uschballen, 1938–1946 Birkenried		Užbaliai	
Loznyaki	Лозняки	Grietischken, 1938–1946 Grieteinen	Grytyszki	Grytiškiai	
Lozovoye	Лозовое	Kremitten and Podollen			
Lozovoye	Лозовое	Salten			
Lozovoye	Лозовое	Eszeratschen, 1936–1938 Escheratschen, 1938–1946; Eschenhang			
Lozovoye†	Лозовое	Kahlholz			
Lugovoye	Луговое	Bilderweitschen, 1938–1946 Bilderweiten	Bilderwejcie	Bildviečiai; Bilviečiai	
Lugovoye	Луговое	Gutenfeld			
Lugovoye	Луговое	Hohenfelde			
Lugovoye†	Луговое	Klein Park and Zwangshof			
Lugovskoye	Луговское	Lobitten		Lobyčiai	
Lukino	Лукино	Kloschenen			
Lukyanovo	Лукьяново	Lenkonischken, 1938–1946 Großschenkendorf		Lenkoniškiai	
Lukyanovo	Лукьяново	Szillenberg, 1936–1946 Schillenberg			
Lunino	Лунино	Dargen			
Lunino	Лунино	Sanditten			
Lunino	Лунино	Lengwethen, 1938–1945 Hohensalzburg, along with Beinigkehmen, 1938–1946 Beiningen	Lengwety	Luninas, Lenkviečiai, Lenkvietis, Beninkiemis	
Lunino†	Лунино	Blumberg, Kreis Gumbinnen			
Luzhki	Лужки	Julienhof, Kreis Königsberg/Samland			
Luzhki	Лужки	Tarputschen, 1938–1946 Sauckenhof	Tarpucze	Tarpučiai	
Luzhki	Лужки	Kiauten		Kiautai	
Luzhki	Лужки	Dittballen, 1938–1946 Streulage		Didbaliai	
Luzhki†	Лужки	Petrineusaß			
Luzhki†	Лужки	Pomauden			
Lvovskoye	Львовское	Gudwallen	Nawoje	Gudvaliai	
Lyotnoye	Лётное	Tenkieten		Tenkytai	
Lyublimovka	Любимовка	Klein Baitschen	Małe Bajcie		now: Podgorovka (Подгоровка)
Lyubimovo†	Любимово	Wisdehnen			
Lyublino	Люблино	Seerappen and Korniten	Karnyczewo; Zaropy	Karnyčiai	
Malakhovo†	Малахово	Ziegelhöfchen, Kreis Wehlau			
Malaya Dubrovka	Малая Дубровка	Bratricken, 1938–1946 Brahetal			
Malaya Dubrovka†	Малая Дубровка	Bugdszen/Bugdschen, 1938–1946 Klimmen			
Malaya Klimovka	Малая Климовка	Groß Grobienen			
Malaya Matrosovka	Малая Матросовка				
Malaya Petrovka†	Малая Петровка	Jurgaitschen, 1938–1946 Kleinau	Jurgajcie		
Malinniki	Малинники	Spitzings		Špicingas	
Malinovka†	Малиновка	Glauthienen			
Malinovka	Малиновка	Stangau			
Malinovka	Малиновка				
Malinovka	Малиновка	Biothen and Podewitten			
Malinovka	Малиновка	Wolmen			
Malinovka	Малиновка	Wargenau			
Malinovka	Малиновка	Sprakten		Sprakčiai	
Malinovka	Малиновка	Meschken, 1938–1946 Meschenhof			now: Grivino
Malodvorki	Малодворки	Sechshuben, Kreis Gerdauen		Malodvorkai	
Malomozhayskoye	Маломожайское	Budwethen, Kreis Ragnit, 1938–1946 Altenkirch, along with Naujeningken, Budwethen parish, 1938–1946; Neusiedel (Ostpreußen), along with Wingschnienen, 1938–1946 Ostmoor	Budwiecie	Būdviečiai, Naujininkiai, Vinkšnynai	
Maloye Isakovo	Малое Исаково	Krug Lauth			
Maloye Izhevskoye	Малое Ижевское	Klein Dumbeln, 1938–1945 Kräuterwiese	Dąbia Mała		
Maloye Kuznetsovo	Малое Кузнецово	Seeberg			
Maloye Lesnoye	Малое Лесное	Friedrichshof, Kreis Königsberg/Samland			
Maloye Lugovoye	Малое Луговое	Gutenfeld (Reichssiedlung)			
Maloye Otvazhnoye	Малое Отважное	Klein Wickbold		Mažasis Vikboldas	
Maloye Ozyornoye	Малое Озёрное	Auklappen	Aukłapie		
Maloye Penzenskoye	Малое Пензенское	Gelleszuhnen/Gelleschuhnen, 1938–1946 Gellenau	Gieleżuny		
Maloye Putyatino	Малое Путятино	Scherrewischken, 1938–1946 Bruderhof			
Maloye Vasilkovo	Малое Васильково	Neudamm (Gut)			
Maltsevo	Мальцево	Klein Karpowen, 1938–1946 Klein Karpau	Karpówko	Mažoji Karpava	
Malyye Berezhki	Малые Бережки	Neu Lappienen, 1938–1946 Rauterdorf		Lapynai	
Mariyskoye	Марийское	Weißenstein		Veisenšteinas	
Marshalskoye	Маршальское	Gallgarben			
Marxovo	Марксово	(Groß) Steinrode, Skursdienen (1938–1946 Steinrode, as well as Steingrenz)			
Maryino	Марьино	Arnau			now: Rodniki (Родники)
Maryino†	Марьино	Schleuduhnen			
Maryinskoye	Марьинское	Marscheiten			
Matrosovo	Матросово	Gilge	Gilia; Gilga	Gilija	
Matrosovo	Матросово	Uggehnen		Vogeinis	
Matveyevka	Матвеевка	Hermannshof		Hermanshofas	
Maximovka	Максимовка	Kaimelswerder			now: Mishkino (Мишкино)
Mayak	Маяк	Brüsterort		Bruzdava	
Mayak†	Маяк	Dobawen	Dobowo		
Mayakovskoye	Маяковское	Nemmersdorf		Nemirkiemis	
Maykovo†	Майково	Neu Park			
Mayovka	Маёвка	Georgenburg	Jeżewo; Jurbork	Jurbarkas	
Mayskiy	Майский	Mandtkeim		Mantkaimis	
Mayskoye	Майское	Meyken		Meikiai	
Mayskoye	Майское	Mallwischken, 1938–1946 Mallwen	Malwiszki	Malviškiai	
Mayskoye	Майское	Groß Bajohren (1938–1946 Baiersfelde and Packerau			
Mayskoye	Майское	Schnecken		Šnekai, Šnekų miškas	
Mechnikovo†	Мечниково	Neuhäuser		Geiduva	
Mechnikovo†	Мечниково	Mauenwalde			
Medovoye	Медовое	Sollnicken and Tykrigehnen	Solniki	Seleninkai & Tikrigėnai	
Medovoye	Медовое	Abschruten, Kreis Ragnit, 1938–1946 Schroten			now: Zabrodino (Забродино)
Medvedevka	Медведевка	Trutenau			
Medvedevka	Медведевка	Muldszehlen, 1936–1938 Muldschehlen, 1938–1946; Muldenwiese			
Medvedevo	Медведево	Norgau		Norguva	
Melnichnoye†	Мельничное	Lesgewangminnen, 1938–1946 Lesgewangen			now: Zabrodino (Забродино)
Melnikovo	Мельниково	Rudau and Jaxen	Rudawa	Rūdava	
Melnikovo	Мельниково	Murgischken, 1938–1946 Bastental	Murgiszki	Murgiškės	
Mendeleyevo	Менделеево	Juditten	Judyty		
Mendeleyevo	Менделеево	Poggenpfuhl		Pogenfulis	
Mezhdulesye	Междулесье	Alt Thalau	Tolewo	Toluva	
Mezhdulesye	Междулесье	Kukers, Jodeiken and Knäblacken		Kraupalaukis	
Mezhdurechye	Междуречье	Groß Pillkallen, 1938–1946 Kallenfeld		Didysis Pilkalnis	
Mezhdurechye†	Междуречье	Auerfluß	Taluliszki		
Mezhdurechye	Междуречье	Norkitten	Norkicie; Narkity	Narkyčiai	
Mezhdurechye	Междуречье (Железнодорожная станция)	Bahnhof Norkitten			
Mezhdurechye†	Междуречье	Piaten			
Michurino†	Мичурино	Klaussitten and Korschellen	Chorzele		
Michurino	Мичурино	Lasdinehlen, 1938–1946 Sommerswalde		Lazdynėliai	
Michurino, Rayon; Chernyakhovsk	Мичурино	Pieragienen, 1928–1946 Angerlinde			
Michurinskiy	Мичуринский	Althof-Ragnit		Senoji Ragainė	
Michurinskoye	Мичуринское	Drücklershöfchen		Driuklershefenas	
Michurinskoye	Мичуринское	Schackeln, Kreis Goldap	Szakiele	Šakaliai	
Mikhaylovka	Михайловка	Linde, Kreis Gerdauen			
Mikhaylovka	Михайловка	Moulienen, 1938–1946 Moulinen		Molynė	
Mikhaylovo	Михайлово	Eszerningken/Escherningken, 1938–1946 Neupassau, along with Wallehlischken, 1938–1946 Hagelsberg	Eszerninki	Ežerninkai, Valeliškiai	
Mikhaylovskoye†	Михайловское	Maraunen, Kreis Heiligenbeil and Nonnenhausen			
Minino	Минино	Bögen, Kreis Friedland/Bartenstein		Mininas	
Minino	Минино	Skrebudicken, 1938–1946 Finkental (Ostpreußen)			
Minskoye	Минское	Groß Pelledauen, 1938–1946 Jungferngrund			
Mirnyy	Мирный	possibly Szieden, 1936–1946 Schieden			
Mishkino	Мишкино	Kaimelswerder			
Mitino	Митино	Stantau			
Mokhovoye	Моховое	Wiskiauten		Viskiautai	
Mokhovoye†	Моховое	Eberswalde, Kreis Preußisch Eylau			
Molodetskoye†	Молодецкое	Heiligenwalde (Domäne)			
Molodogvardeyskoye†	Молодогвардейское	Finken			
Molochnoye†	Молочное	Klein Drebnau		Drebnuva	
Mordovskoye	Мордовское	Sergitten, Kreis Labiau			
Mordovskoye	Мордовское	Groß Legitten			now: Turgenevo (Тургенево)
Morgunovo	Моргуново	Langendorf, Kreis Königsberg/Samland			
Morozovka	Морозовка	Sacherau		Sakerava	
Morozovka	Морозовка	Ober Alkehnen, Unter Alkehnen			
Morozovka†	Морозовка	Klein Astrawischken, 1938–1946 Ilmengrund			
Morshanskoye	Моршанское	Schreitlacken			
Morskoye	Морское	Pillkoppen	Piłkopy	Pilkopa	
Moshenskoye	Мошенское	(Adlig) Pil(l)kallen, 1921–1938 Neu Pillkallen, 1938–1946 Rüttelsdorf			
Moskovskoye	Московское	Schrombehnen		Skrumbainys; Šrombėnai	
Moskovskoye	Московское	Partheinen and Mükühnen		Partėnai & Mukūnai	
Moskovskoye	Московское	Wieszeiten/Wiescheiten, 1938–1946 Kleinsommershöfen		Vyžaičiai, Liutkai	
Moskvino	Москвино	Naujeningken, Budwethen parish, 1938–1946: Neusiedel (Ostpreußen)			now: Malomozhayskoye (Маломожайское)
Mostovoye	Мостовое	Sköpen	Nowe Skopy	Skiepai	
Mostovoye	Мостовое	Kallwischken, 1938–1946 Hengstenberg		Kalviškiai	
Mostovoye†	Мостовое	Laugallen, 1938–1946 Kleehausen			
Mostovoye†	Мостовое	Budweitschen, 1938–1946 Zenthof			
Motornoye†	Моторное	Groß Jägersdorf		Gros Jegersdorfas	
Mozyr	Мозырь	Klein Gnie, 1938–1946 Kleingnie	Kniewo; Małe Gnie		
Muratovo†	Муратово	Panzhof			
Muravyovo	Муравьёво	Praßlauken, 1938–1946 Praßfeld			
Muromskoye	Муромское	Laptau, Kreis Fischhausen/Samland		Labota	
Muromskoye†	Муромское	Tenknitten, Kreis Preußisch Eylau	Tęknity		
Mushkino	Мушкино	Lauck and Stobecken		Stabikai	
Mysovka	Мысовка	Karkeln	Karkele	Karklė	
Nadezhdino	Надеждино	Lampasch	Łapaszki		
Nadezhdino†	Надеждино	Gersthenen		Girstenys	
Nadezhdino†	Надеждино	Twergaiten			
Nagornoye	Нагорное	Groß Dexen and Roditten	Deksnie Wielkie and Rodyty		
Nagornoye	Нагорное	Koggen			
Nagornoye	Нагорное	Alt Ragaischen, 1938–1946 Konradshof			
Nagornoye	Нагорное	Perkappen, Kreis Friedland/Bartenstein			
Nagornoye	Нагорное	Geswethen, 1938–1946 Landwehr		Gesviečiai	
Nagornoye†	Нагорное	Jodszen/Jodschen, 1938–1946 Ackermühle			
Nagornoye†	Нагорное	Gobienen			
Nagornoye†	Нагорное	Wilpischen, Kreis Stallupönen/Ebenrode, 1938–1946 Wilpen		Vilpišiai	
Nakhimovo	Нахимово	Roddau, Perkuiken, Kreis Wehlau and Wilhelminenhof, Kreis Wehlau			
Nakhimovo†	Нахимово	Bardszen, 1938–1946 Bartschen			
Nakhimovo†	Нахимово	Louisenthal, Kreis Insterburg, and Irrmuntinnen			
Naumovka	Наумовка	Germehnen			
Nechayevo	Нечаево	Ottoberg			
Nekrasovka	Некрасовка	Nordenthal, Kreis Gerdauen			
Nekrasovo†	Некрасово	Wöterkeim and Moddien			
Nekrasovo	Некрасово	Liska-Schaaken	Szaki	Liskas-Žokai	
Nekrasovo	Некрасово	Groß Sodehnen, 1938–1946 Grenzen		Didieji Sodėnai	
Nekrasovo	Некрасово	(Groß) Karpowen, 1938–1945 Karpauen	Karpowo Wielkie; Karpowo	Didžioji Karpava	
Nekrasovo	Некрасово	(Groß) Scharlack		Šarlaukis	
Nelidovo	Нелидово	Maleyken, 1938–1946 Maleiken	Malejki	Maleikos	
Nemanskoye	Неманское	Trappönen, 1938–1946 Trappen	Trapony	Trapėnai	
Nevskoye	Невское	Fabiansfelde and Groß Lauth			
Nevskoye	Невское	Pillupönen, Kreis Stallupönen 1938–1946 Schloßbach	Pilupiany	Pilupėnai	
Nezhinskoye	Нежинское	Neu Kattenau		Naujoji Katniava	
Nikitino	Никитино	Bawien, 1938–1946 Bauden			
Nikitovka	Никитовка	Uszpiaunen, 1936–1938 Uschpiaunen, 1938–1946 Kiesdorf		Užpjauniai	
Nikitovka	Никитовка	Lablacken			
Nikolayevka	Николаевка	Waldburg, Kreis Gerdauen	Zameczno		
Nikolskoye	Никольское	Giewerlauken, 1938–1946 Hirschflur	Birkalnie	Gyverlaukiai & Birkalnis	
Nilovo	Нилово	Groß Polleyken, 1938–1946 (Groß) Polleiken	Polejki Wielkie	Paleikiai	
Nivenskoye	Нивенское	Wittenberg, Kreis Preußisch Eylau as well as Friederikenthal		Nivenskojė	
Nivy	Нивы	Kompehnen			
Nizhneye	Нижнее	Sollecken			
Nizmennoye	Низменное	Pleinlauken, 1928–1946 Rosenthal		Plynlaukiai	
Nizovka	Низовка	Nadrau, Kreis Fischhausen/Samland		Nadruva	
Nizovye	Низовье	Waldau			
Novaya Derevnya	Новая Деревня	Alt Gertlauken	Giertławki; Stare Giertlauki	Gertlaukiai, Senieji Gertlaukiai	
Novaya Zhizn	Новая Жизнь	Friedrichswalde, along with Neu Domharthenen, 1938–1946 Kleindomhardtfelde			
Novgorodskoye	Новгородское	Mettkeim			
Novgorodskoye	Новгородское	Egglenischken, 1938–1946 Preußischnassau	Jegliniszki	Egliniškės	
Novinki	Новинки	Kögsten, 1938–1946 Michelfelde		Kėkštai	
Novo-Biyskoye	Ново-Бийское	Friedrichswalde, Kreis Gerdauen			
Novo-Bobruysk	Ново-Бобруйск	Ilmsdorf			
Novo-Dorozhnyy	Ново-Дорожный	Hoch Karschau			
Novo-Guryevskoye	Ново-Гурьевское	Kallnen, 1938–1946 Drachenberg			
Novo-Kamenskoye	Ново-Каменское	Kathrinlacken		Kotrynlaukiai	
Novokhatka	Новохатка	Skarupnen, 1938–1946 Hartental	Skorupno		
Novokolkhoznoye	Новоколхозное	Neu Argeningken, 1938–1946 Argenbrück, along with Bublauken, 1938–1946 Argenfurt, Sandlauken, 1938–1946 Sandfelde and Willkischken	Zandlauki	Naujieji Argeninkai, Bublaukiai, Sandlaukiai, & Vilkiškiai	
Novo-Moskovskoye	Ново-Московское	Poplitten, Louisenhof and Alt Kaimen/Pörschken	Popolity	Popalyčiai	
Novoselskoye	Новосельское	Schaltischledimmen, 1929–1945 Neuwiese		Šaltyšlydimai	
Novoselskoye	Новосельское	Willkeim		Vilkaimis	
Novoseltsevo	Новосельцево	Worellen, 1938–1946 Runden			
Novoselye†	Новоселье	Kariotkehmen, 1938–1946 Karkeim			
Novoselye	Новоселье	Waiwern, 1938–1946 Seilhofen			now: Pokrovskoye
Novo-Slavyanskoye	Ново-Славянское	Königsfelde			
Novoslavkino	Новославкино	Schaltinnen, 1938–1946 Quellental	Szałtynie	Šaltiniai	
Novostroyka	Новостройка				
Novostroyevo	Новостроево	Trempen	Trąpy; Trąbki Mazurskie	Trempai	
Novostroyevo	Новостроево	Waldhöhe			
Novosyolki	Новосёлки	Klein Waldeck		Mažasis Valdekas	
Novosyolki	Новосёлки	Neuendorf, Kreis Gerdauen		Nojendorfas	
Novosyolki†	Новосёлки	Labben			
Novosyolovo	Новосёлово	Groß Rödersdorf			
Novouralskoye	Новоуральское	Uszpiaunehlen/Uschpiaunehlen, 1938–1946 Fohlental		Užpjaunėliai	
Novoye†	Новое	Trimmau		Tremavas	
Novoye Lesnoye	Новое Лесное	(formerly unnamed locality)			
Novoye Nilovo†	Новое Нилово	Klein Polleyken, 1938–1946 Klein Polleyken	Polejki Małe		
Novyy	Новый	Eichenkrug			
Obruchevo	Обручево	Groß Wingsnupönen, 1938–1946 Großwingen, along with Kellmienen, 1938–1946 Kellen (Ostpreußen), and: Försterei Lappienen		Vinkšnupėnai, Kelmynė	
Obukhovo	Обухово	Lixeiden		Ligsėdai	
Ochakovo	Очаково	Groß Kannapinnen, 1938–1946 Steinsruh		Didieji Kanapynai	
Ogorodnoye	Огородное	Ernsthof, Kreis Darkehmen (Angerapp)			
Okhotnichye	Охотничье	Klein Ilmsdorf			
Okhotnichye†	Охотничье	Groß Ballupönen, 1928–1938 Ballupönen, 1938–1946 Löffkeshof			
Okhotnoye†	Охотное	Bombitten			
Okhotnoye	Охотное	Bieskobnicken	Biskupniki	Vyskupininkai	
Okhotnoye	Охотное	Liedemeiten, 1938–1946 Gerhardsweide	Lidemejty	Lydimaičiai	
Oktyabrskoye	Октябрьское	Alt Weynothen, 1938–1946 Weinoten	Stare Wajnoty	Senieji Vainotai	
Oktyabrskoye	Октябрьское	Klein Schönau			
Oktyabrskoye	Октябрьское	Panzerlauken, 1938–1946 Panzerfelde		Pancerlaukiai	
Oktyabrskoye	Октябрьское	Wargitten and Patranken		Vargyčiai & Patrankos	
Oktyabrskoye†	Октябрьское	Moritten, Kreis Preußisch Eylau			
Oktyabrskoye	Октябрьское	Dopsattel			since 1993: Zarechnoye (Заречное)
Okunyovo†	Окунёво	Nodems			
Okunyovo	Окунёво	Kekorischken, 1938–1946 Auerbach		Kekoriškiai	
Olkhovatka	Ольховатка	Walterkehmen, 1938–1946 Großwaltersdorf	Walterkiejmy	Valterkiemis	
Olkhovka	Ольховка	Köllmisch Damerau and Kawerninken, 1938–1946: Kawernicken	Mały Damerów		
Olkhovoye	Ольховое	Korwingen		Karvingiai	
Olshanka	Ольшанка	Obrotten		Abrotai	
Olshanka†	Ольшанка	Bohlen			
Olyokhovo	Олёхово	Grieben	Grzybno	Grybai	
Onezhskoye†	Онежское	Gulbenischken, 1938–46 Gulbensee	Gulbeniszki; Gulbieniszki		
Onezhskoye	Онежское	Schröterlauken, 1938–1946 Schrötersheim			now: Podgorovka (Подгоровка)
Opochenskoye	Опоченское	Groß Skirlack	Skirławki Wielkie	Skirlaukis	
Opushki	Опушки	Adlig Gallgarben			
Opushki	Опушки	Wolfshöhe, Kreis Gerdauen	Wilcze Pole	Volfshohas	
Orekhovka	Ореховка	Poduhren		Padūriai	
Orekhovo	Орехово	Althof, Kreis Preußisch Eylau	Starydwór; Stary Dwór	Senkaimis	
Orekhovo	Орехово	Schalben		Skalbiai	
Orekhovo	Орехово	Neu Löbkojen, 1938–1946: Neulepkau		Liepkojai	
Orlovka	Орловка	Nesselbeck			
Orlovka†	Орловка	Austinehlen (1938–1946 Austinshof), Adomlauken (1938–1946 Adamshausen and Pennacken) (1938–1946 Werfen)			
Osinovka†	Осиновка	Konitten			
Osinovka†	Осиновка	Osseningken, 1931–1946 Grünau			
Osinovka	Осиновка	Stampelken			
Osinovka	Осиновка	Uszballen, 1936–1938 Uschballen, 1938–1946 Dittau		Užbaliai	
Osinovka†	Осиновка	Wandlaudszen, 1936–1938 Wandlaudschen, 1938–1946 Rotenkamp			
Osokino	Осокино	Blöcken			
Osokino	Осокино	Groß Waldeck			
Osokino	Осокино	Panjes		Panijos	
Ostrogorki	Острогорки	Groß Schunkern		Šunkariai	
Ostrogozhskoye	Острогожское	Uzbördszen/Uschbördschen, 1938–1946 Karpfenwinkel, along with Waldlinden and Rucken, Kreis Pillkallen		Užberžiai, Rukai	
Ostrovnoye	Островное	Motzwethen, 1938–1946 Motzfelde		Mocviečiai	
Ostrovnoye	Островное	Liepnicken			since 1993: Zarechnoye (Заречное)
Ostrovskoye†	Островское	Mostitten, Plenitten and Ranglack			
Ostrovskoye	Островское	Seewalde, Kreis Königsberg/Samland			
Otkosovo	Откосово	Rosignaiten		Rasinaičiai	
Otradnoye	Отрадное	Karmitten			
Otradnoye	Отрадное	Kunigehlen, 1938–1946 Stroppau	Kunigiele	Kunigėliai	
Otradnoye	Отрадное	Georgenswalde			
Otradnoye	Отрадное	Blockinnen, 1938–1946 Blocken		Blėkinėnai	
Otradnoye†	Отрадное	Groß Skattegirren, 1938–1946 Groschenweide			
Otradnoye†	Отрадное	Patilszen/Patilschen, 1938–1946 Insterwalde			
Otvazhnoye	Отважное	Braxeinswalde and Wickbold		Vikboldas	
Ovrazhnoye	Овражное	Nickelsdorf, Kreis Königsberg/Samland			
Ovrazhnoye†	Овражное	Wilhelmshöhe, Kreis Friedland/Bartenstein			
Ovrazhnoye	Овражное	Blumental, Kreis Insterburg		Blumentalis	
Ovrazhye	Овражье	Schlepecken, 1938–1946 Kleinpronitten		Šlepekiai	
Ozerki	Озерки	Groß Lindenau	Ogławiszki	Aglaviškiai	
Ozerki	Озерки	Warnen, Kreis Goldap	Warny	Varnai	
Ozerki	Озерки	Georgenfelde			
Ozerovo	Озерово	Tranßau and Gidauten		Transevis	
Ozyornoye	Озёрное	Groß Barthen and Klein Hohenhagen			
Ozyornoye	Озёрное	Neu Lappönen		Naujieji Lapėnai	
Ozyornoye†	Озёрное	Alt Lubönen			
Panfilovo	Панфилово	Klonofken, 1938–1946 Dreimühl	Klonówka	Klonovka	
Panfilovo	Панфилово	Podszohnen/Podschohnen 1938–1946 Buschfelde			
Panfilovo†	Панфилово	Preußisch Thierau			
Panfilovo	Панфилово	Seekampen			
Paporotnoye	Папоротное	Plonszöwen, 1936–1946 Waldhufen as well as Sturmen		Plonžieviai & Šturmai	
Parkovoye	Парковое	Purpesseln, 1938–1946 Auenhof			now: Podduby (Поддубы)
Partizanskoye	Партизанское	Schönmohr		Šionmoras	
Partizanskoye†	Партизанское	Obszerninken, 1936–1938 Obscherninken, 1938–1946 Dachsrode		Opšrininkai	
Parusnoye	Парусное	Gaffken		Gaudikai	
Pastuchovo	Пастухово	Waldhausen, Kreis Insterburg (Gut/Oberförsterei)			
Pastukhovo†	Пастухово	Sergehnen			
Pavlinino	Павлинино	Dommelkeim, Kreis Fischhausen/Samland		Domelkaimis	
Pavlovo†	Павлово	Lochstädt			
Pavlovo	Павлово	Sonnenberg			
Pchyolino	Пчёлино	Talskeim			
Pelevino	Пелевино	Laukandten, 1938–1946 Waldeneck		Laukantai	
Penki	Пеньки	Skungirren, 1938–1946 Scheunenort		Skūngiriai	
Penzenskoye	Пензенское	Dakehnen, 1938–1946 Daken			
Penzovka†	Пензовка	Louisenhof, Jesau parish, Kreis Preußisch Eylau			
Peredovoye	Передовое	Postehnen			
Pereleski†	Перелески	Waldhausen, Kreis Fischhausen/Samland		Valdhauzenas	
Pereleski	Перелески	Mühle Keppurren, 1938–1946 Friedrichsmühle		Kepuriai	
Pereleski†	Перелески	Gräbenswalde			
Perelesnoye	Перелесное	Pagelienen		Pagelynai	
Pereslavskoye	Переславское	Drugehnen		Drugėnai	
Perevalovo	Перевалово	Muldszen/Muldschen, 1938–1946: Mulden	Muldzie	Muldžiai	
Perevalovo†	Перевалово	Schwönau			
Perovo†	Перово	Sokallen	Sokoły		
Pervomayskoye	Первомайское	Pottlitten		Podelyčiai	
Pervomayskoye	Первомайское	Kuggen			
Pervomayskoye	Первомайское	Sadweitschen, 1938–1946 Altkrug		Sodviečiai	
Pervomayskoye	Первомайское	Bareischkehmen, 1938–1946 Baringen		Bareiškiemis	
Pervomayskoye†	Первомайское	Groß Wannaglauken, 1938–1946 Großwalde			
Pervomayskoye†	Первомайское	Kavern, vor 1905 Cavern			
Peschanoye	Песчаное	Dorotheenhof, Kreis Fischhausen/Samland			
Peski	Пески	Bagdohnen, 1938–1946 Kleinsausreppen	Bogdany	Bagdonai	
Peski†	Пески	Parwischken, 1938–1946 Parwen	Parwiszki	Parviškiai	
Peski	Пески	Smaledumen, 1935–1946 Fichtenberg			
Peskovo†	Песково	Groß Schönau			
Pesochnoye	Песочное	Gallitten and Palpasch			
Pesochnoye	Песочное	Althof, Kreis Friedland/Bartenstein			
Petino	Петино	Bartuszen/Bartuschen, 1938–1946 Bartelshöfen, along with Groß Rudlauken, 1938–1946 Rotenfeld, and Perdollen			
Petropavlovskoye	Петропавловское	Groß Schillehlen, 1938–1946 Großschollen, along with Eggleningken, 1938–1946 Lindengarten		Didieji Šileliai, Naujieji Ėglininkai	
Petrovka	Петровка	Szeeben/Scheeben			
Petrovka	Петровка	Sperlings			now: Krasnopolye (Краснополье)
Petrovo	Петрово	Zielkeim			
Petrovskoye	Петровское	Jerlauken			since 1993: Chapayevo (Чапаево)
Petrovskoye	Петровское	Lawischkehmen, 1938–1946 Stadtfelde		Laviškiemis	
Pirogovo	Пирогово	Sudnicken			
Plavni	Плавни	Plawischken, 1938–1946 Plauendorf	Pławiszki	Plaviškės	
Plodovoye	Плодовое	Tawell			
Pobeda	Победа	Arnsberg and Struwe		Struvė	
Pobedino	Победино	Legitten			
Pobedino	Победино	Schillehnen (1938–1946 Schillfelde), Inglauken, Strunzlaugken (1938–1946 Strunzhof)	Szyleny	Šilėnai, Ingliaudai, Strunclaukis	
Pobedino	Победино	Endrejen (1938–1946 Ossafelde)		Endriejai	
Poberezhye	Побережье	Schnakeinen, Neu Schnakeinen, Porschkeim and Kissitten (bei Kreuzburg), Kreis Preußisch Eylau		Šnekainys	
Poddubye	Поддубье	Jagsten		Jakštai	
Poddubnoye	Поддубное	Fürstenwalde, Kreis Königsberg/Samland			
Poddubnoye	Поддубное	Gollau			
Poddubnoye	Поддубное	Groß Keylau		Kailava	
Poddubnoye	Поддубное	Groß Sporwitten			
Poddubnoye	Поддубное	Schönwiese, Kreis Insterburg			
Podduby	Поддубы	Kubbeln, along with Purpesseln, 1938–1946 Auenhof		Kubilai	
Podgornoye	Подгорное	Penken			
Podgornoye	Подгорное	Gamsau			
Podgornoye	Подгорное	Titschken, 1938–1946 Tischken		Tičkai	
Podgornoye	Подгорное	Wiepeningken, 1928–1946 Staatshausen		Vypininkai	
Podgorovka	Подгоровка	Groß Baitschen, Klein Baitschen and Schröterlauken, 1938–1946 Schrötersheim		Didieji Baičiai	
Podlesnoye†	Подлесное	Wernsdorf, Dauden		Daudai	
Podlesye†	Подлесье	Supplitten			
Podlesye†	Подлесье	Dietrichswalde			
Podlipovo	Подлипово	Hochlindenberg		Leipgarbis	
Podorozhnoye	Подорожное	Forklen			
Podsobnyy	Подсобный	Groß Reikeninken, 1938–1946 Reiken		Raikininkai	
Pogranichnoye	Пограничное	Hussehnen		Usainys	
Pogranichnoye	Пограничное	Groß Illmen	Ilmy Wielkie		
Pogranichnoye†	Пограничное	Redden, Kreis Friedland/Bartenstein			
Pogranichnyy	Пограничный	Hermsdorf			
Pogranichnyy	Пограничный	Schillehnen, 1938–1946 Waldheide, Kreis; Ragnit/Tilsit-Ragnit, along with Dirwehlen, 1938 until 1946 Wehlen	Szyleny	Šilėnai, Dirveliai	
Pokrovskoye	Покровское	Bibehlen, 1938–1946 Falkenhausen, along with Waiwern, 1938–1946 Seilhofen		Bibeliai & Vaivorai	
Pokrovskoye	Покровское	Sorgenau			
Pokrovskoye	Покровское	Buttkuhnen, 1938–1946 Tilsental, as well as Krebschen, 1938–1946 Eichbaum	Butkuny	Butkūnai	
Pokrovskoye†	Покровское	Steindorf, Kreis Heiligenbeil			
Pokrovskoye	Покровское	Nurnischken, 1938–1946 Dreisiedel			
Pokryshkino	Покрышкино	Dopönen, 1938–1946 Grünweide		Dopėnai	
Polevoy	Полевой	Luschninken, 1938–1946 Friedrichsmühle, Kreis Labiau		Lūšininkai	
Polevoye	Полевое	Mahnsfeld			
Poltavskoye	Полтавское	Perkappen, Kreis Labiau			
Poltavskoye	Полтавское	Groß Rudszen/Groß Rudschen, 1938–1946 Mühlenhöhe, along with Neu Rudszen/Neu Rudschen		Didieji Rudžiai & Naujieji Rudžiai	
Polyanskoye	Полянское	Ballupönen, 1938–46 Ballen, along with Uszballen/Uschballe, 1938–46 Lindnershorst, along with Königshuld, 1938–46 Friedrichsweiler		Užbaliai & Balupėnai	
Porechye†	Поречье	Ober Ecker as well as Unter Ecker			
Porechye†	Поречье	Balschkehmen, 1938–1946 Balsken			
Porechye	Поречье	Allenau			
Porkhovo	Порхово	Zodszen/Zodschen, 1938–1946 Zoden	Sodzie	Sodžiai	
Porkhovskoye	Порховское	Jenuciszki, 1936–1938 Kermuschienen, 1938–1946 Fritzenau	Jenuciszki		
Pospelovo†	Поспелово	Klein Mixeln			
Pospelovo†	Поспелово	Progen			
Potyomkino†	Потёмкино	Schirten			
Povarovka	Поваровка	Kirpehnen		Kirpėnai, Kirpainiai	
Praslovo	Праслово	Schönefeld, Kreis Gerdauen	Paszkowo		
Pravdino	Правдино	Thiemsdorf, Kreis Königsberg/Samland			
Pravdino	Правдино	Grumbkowkeiten, 1938–1946 Grumbkowsfelde, as well as Wingern, Kreis Pillkallen/Schloßberg		Grambkaukaičiai & Vingriai	
Priboy	Прибой	Rosehnen, 1938–1946 Seebad Rosehnen			
Pribrezhnoye	Прибрежное	Palmburg			
Pribrezhnyy	Прибрежный	Heyde-Waldburg, 1938–1946 Heidewaldburg			
Prichaly	Причалы	Inse	Inza	Insė	
Pridorozhnoye	Придорожное	Kirschappen, Kreis Königsberg/Samland		Kiršapai	
Pridorozhnoye	Придорожное	Neu Droosden		Drostenas	
Pridorozhnoye	Придорожное	Groß Asznaggern, 1936–1946 Grenzberg		Ašnugariai	
Pridorozhnoye	Придорожное	Seßlacken	Zeslaki	Žaslys	
Prigorkino†	Пригоркино	Karben			
Prigorodnoye	Пригородное	Petrikatschen, 1938–1946 Schützenort		Petrikaičiai	
Prigorodnoye	Пригородное	Hasenberg, Kreis Wehlau		Hazenbergas	
Prigorodnoye	Пригородное	Sandfluß, 1931–1946 Lindental		Žiezdrinė	
Primorye	Приморье	Groß Kuhren		Didieji Kuršiai	
Primorskoye	Приморское	Wolittnick		Volitnikas	
Priozyornoye	Приозёрное	Gerwischkehmen, 1938–1946 Gerwen	Gierwiszkiejmy	Gerviškėnai	
Priozyornoye	Приозёрное	Stablacken, Pelleningken parish		Stablaukis	
Priozyornoye	Приозёрное	Gidauten			now: Ozerovo
Priozyornoye†	Приозёрное	Kallweitschen, 1938–1946: Kornberg	Mściszki Wielkie		
Priozyorye	Приозёрье	Argelothen, 1938–1946 Argendorf		Argelotai	
Prirechnoye	Приречное	Gillischken, 1938–1946 Insterblick		Giliškiai	
Prirechnoye†	Приречное	Wilhelmswerder			
Prislovo	Прислово	Nöttnicken		Netnykiai	
Privalovka	Приваловка	Nausseden, Kreis Niederung, 1938–1946 Kleindünen		Nausėdai	
Privalovo	Привалово	Mangarben		Mangarbis	
Privolnoye†	Привольное	Plössen			
Privolnoye	Привольное	Gunthenen		Guntainiai	
Privolnoye	Привольное	Demmenen, 1938–1946 Demmen		Demeniai	
Privolnoye	Привольное	Neunischken, 1938–1947 Neunassau	Neumiszki	Naniškas	
Privolnoye	Привольное	Saussienen		Sausynai	
Progress†	Прогресс	Auglitten, Kreis Friedland/Bartenstein			
Prokhladnoye	Прохладное	Kragau		Kragava	
Prokhladnoye	Прохладное	Kallningken, 1938–1946 Herdenau	Kalninki	Kalnininkai	
Prokhladnoye†	Прохладное	Frisching			
Prokhladnoye†	Прохладное	Klein Kolpacken, 1938–1946 Kleinbachrode			
Prokhladnoye†	Прохладное	Schuiken, 1938–1946 Spechtsboden			
Prokhorovka	Прохоровка	Fünflinden			
Proletarskoye	Пролетарское	Legnitten		Legnyčiai	
Proletarskoye	Пролетарское	Ganderkehmen		Gandrakiemiai	
Prozorovo†	Прозорово	Geidau			
Prudki	Прудки	Knauten			
Prudki†	Прудки	Lönkendorf			
Prudnoye	Прудное	Alt Wehlau	Iława Stara	Vėluva	
Prudnoye	Прудное	Brindlacken, 1938–1946 Kleinfritzenau		Brindlaukiai	
Prudy	Пруды	Abbarten			
Prudy	Пруды	Genslack			
Prudy	Пруды	Kadgiehnen			
Pskovksoye	Псковское	Petzingken, Pillkallen parish, 1938–1946: Hainort		Pečinkiai	
Pskovskoye	Псковское	Friedrichsberg	Szakuny	Šakūnai	
Pskovskoye	Псковское	(Königlich) Pogrimmen, 1938–1946 Grimmen	Gromy	Pagrimiai	
Pugachyovo†	Пугачёво	Wilmsdorf			
Pugachyovo	Пугачёво	Groß Schwentischken, 1938–1946 Schanzenort	Świętyszki Wielkie; Wielkie Święciszki	Šventiškiai	
Pugachyovo	Пугачёво	Neu Skardupönen, 1938–1946 Grenzwald		Naujieji Skardupėnai	
Pushkaryovo	Пушкарёво	Puschdorf		Puškiemis	
Pushkino	Пушкино	Posmahlen		Pasmaliai	
Pushkino†	Пушкино	Wesselshöfen, Kreis Heiligenbeil			
Pushkino	Пушкино	Bruiszen/Bruischen, 1938–1946 Lindenbruch		Bruišiai	
Pushkino	Пушкино	Göritten	Gierycie	Gėritai; Geryčiai	
Pushkinskoye	Пушкинское				
Pushkinskoye†	Пушкинское	Wessolowen, 1938–1946 Wesselau	Wesołowo	Veselava	
Putilovo	Путилово	Gauten and Korjeiten		Gaučiai	
Pyatidorozhnoye	Пятидорожное	Bladiau	Bledziewo	Bladuva	
Rabotkino	Работкино	Tublauken, 1938–1946 Schweizersfelde			now: Lomovo
Raduzhnoye†	Радужное	Jagdhaus Rominten			
Rakitino	Ракитино	Kurschen, Kreis Ragnit/Tilsit-Ragnit		Kuršiai	
Rakitino†	Ракитино	Rothenen, Kreis Fischhausen/Samland			
Rakitnoye	Ракитное	Plautwehnen		Plautviniai	
Rakitnoye†	Ракитное	Rappeln	Ropele		
Raskovo†	Расково	Gostkow			
Rassvet	Рассвет	Knöppelsdorf			
Rassvet†	Рассвет	Schönwalde, Kreis Friedland/Bartenstein			
Ratnoye	Ратное	Freudenberg, Kreis Wehlau			
Rayevskoye†	Раевское	Plompen		Plumpai	
Razdolnoye	Раздольное	(Adlig) Pohren		Poros	
Razdolnoye	Раздольное	Klein Tarpupönen, 1938–1946 Sommerkrug		Mažieji Tarpupėnai	
Razdolnoye	Раздольное	Warnigkeim			
Razdolnoye	Раздольное	Tramischen, 1938–1946 Trammen		Tramišiai	
Razino	Разино	Louisenfelde			
Razino	Разино	Juwendt (1938–1946 Möwenort) as well as Alt Heidendorf (1938–1946 Heidendorf)		Juventai &Gyventė	
Razliv	Разлив	Derwehlischken			
Rechitsa†	Речица	Matzutkehmen, 1938–1946 Matzhausen	Maciejkowo	Mažutkiemis	
Rechkalovo	Речкалово	Abschermeningken, 1938–1946 Fuchstal			
Rechki	Речки	Groß Pöppeln	Wielkie Pople	Pipala	
Rechki†	Речки	Alexkehmen, 1938–1946 Alexbrück			
Rechnoye	Речное	Magotten			
Rechnoye†	Речное	Redden, Kreis Wehlau			
Reznikovo	Резниково	Röseningken, 1938–1946 Rößningen	Rożniki	Rėžininkai	
Rodniki	Родники	Leißienen			
Rodniki	Родники	Arnau, Preußisch Arnau and Jungferndorf	Ornowo	Arnava	
Rodniki	Родники	Radnicken		Rotenikai	
Rodnikovo	Родниково	Groß Wittgirren, 1928–1946 Mittenwalde		Vidgiriai	
Rodnikovo†	Родниково	Snappen, 1938–1946 Schnappen			
Rogachyovo	Рогачёво	Lopsienen			
Romanovo	Романово	Pobethen		Pabėtai	
Roshchino	Рощино	Dalheim		Dalkiemis	
Roshchino	Рощино	Possindern		Pasindrys	
Roshchino	Рощино	Georgenau		Jurgenava	
Roshchino	Рощино	Grünhoff		Griunhofas	
Roshchino†	Рощино	Kartzauningken, 1932–1946 Fichtenwalde			
Rossoschanka	Россошанка	Neu Sauskoyen, 1938–1946 Neusauswalde	Nowe Suszki		
Rossoshanskoye	Россошанское	Waldlinden and Rucken, Kreis Pillkallen			now: Ostrogozhskoye (Острогожское)
Rostovskoye	Ростовское	Tölteninken		Tiltininkai	
Rovnoye	Ровное	Romau			
Rovnoye	Ровное	Heinrichsdorf, Kreis Bartenstein (Friedland)			
Rozhkovo	Рожково	Perwissau			
Rubinovka	Рубиновка	Rauben (– Degelgirren)			
Rucheyki	Ручейки	Eszergallen/Eschergallen, 1938–1946 Tiefenort	Jeziorne		
Ruchyi	Ручьи	Bieberswalde, Kreis Wehlau			
Ruchyi†	Ручьи	Freudenberg, Kreis Insterburg			
Rudakovo	Рудаково	Ruddecken		Rudakiai	
Russkoye	Русское	Germau	Girmo	Girmava	
Ryabinino	Рябинино	Korwlack			
Ryabinovka	Рябиновка	Schmoditten		Smedyčiai	
Ryabinovka	Рябиновка	Groß Raum			
Ryabinovka	Рябиновка	Kerstupönen, 1938–1946 Kersten			
Ryabinovka	Рябиновка	Jungferndorf			now: Rodniki (Родники)
Ryabinovoye	Рябиновое	Kallehnen, Kreis Wehlau		Kalėnai	
Ryadino	Рядино	Raudszen/Raudschen, 1938–1946 Rautengrund, along with Bambe, 1938–1946 Heidenanger		Raudžiai & Bambė	
Ryazanskoye†	Рязанское	Guwöhnen			
Ryazanskoye	Рязанское	Hallwischken, 1938–1946 Hallweg	Galwiszki	Alviškiai	
Rybachiy	Рыбачий	Rossitten	Rosity; Różyty	Rasytė	
Rybachye	Рыбачье	Loye	Łoja	Lūja	
Rybachye	Рыбаче	Wangitt			
Rybakovo	Рыбаково	Follendorf			
Rybino†	Рыбино	Wyszupönen, 1938–1945: Kaltensee	Wyszupiany	Vyžupėnai	
Rybkino	Рыбкино	Annenhof			
Rybnoye	Рыбное	Steinbeck			
Rzhevskoye	Ржевское	Adlig Neuendorf			
Rzhevskoye	Ржевское	Linkuhnen		Linkūnai	
Sadovoye	Садовое	(formerly unnamed settlement near Kreuzburg (Ostpreußen))			
Sadovoye	Садовое	Ballethen	Balecie		
Sadovoye	Садовое	Elluschönen, 1938–1946 Ellern		Eliušėnai	
Sadovoye	Садовое	Jentkutkampen, 1938–1946 Burgkampen		Gentkutkampiai	
Sadovoye	Садовое	Schallgirren (Szallgirren), 1938–1946 Kreuzhausen	Szalgiry		
Sadovoye	Садовое	Groß Niebudszen, 1936–1938 Groß Niebudschen, 1938–1946 Steinsee			
Sadovoye†	Садовое	Swainen, Kreis Insterburg			
Sadovo	Садовое	Groß Kackschen, 1938–1946 Birkenhain		Didieji Kakšiai	
Salivino†	Заливино	Tawe	Tawa	Tovė	
Salskoye†	Сальское	Friedrichshof, Kreis Fischhausen/Samland			
Salskoye	Сальское	Sankt Lorenz			
Saltykovo	Салтыково	Klein Budlacken, Kerulaten (1938–1946: Kerlaten) and Muplacken (1938–1946: Moptau)			
Samarskoye	Самарское	Bergershof, Kreis Pillkallen/Schloßberg			
Saranskoye	Саранское	Laukischken and Powangen	Łaukiszki	Laukiška	
Saratovskoye	Саратовское	Groß Schorellen, 1938–1946 Adlerswalde	Szorele	Didieji Šoreliai	
Saratovskoye†	Саратовское	Dallwitz, Forsthaus			
Sarayevo	Сараево	Ihlnicken		Ylnikai	
Sazanovka	Сазановка	Sonnigkeim			
Sebezhskoye†	Себежское	Demildschen (Demildszen), 1938–1946 Kleinkamanten			
Sedovo	Седово	Charlottenthal, Kreis Friedland/Bartenstein			
Seltsy†	Сельцы	Königstann			
Semyonovo	Семёново	Fuchsberg and Marienhagen, Kreis Königsberg/ Kreis Preußisch Eylau/Samland			
Semyonovo†	Семёново	Dichtenwalde, Kreis Preußisch Eylau			
Senzovo	Сенцово	Pabbeln, Kreis Insterburg, 1928–1946 Amwalde		Pabaliai	
Sentsovo†	Сенцово	Wolfsdorf, Kreis Niederung/Elchniederung			
Sergeyevka	Сергеевка	Klein Pentlack		Sergejevka	
Sergeyevo	Сергеево	Klein Lauth			
Serovo	Серово	Astrawischken, 1938–1946 Großzedmar			
Seryogino	Серёгино	Ludwigsfelde		Liudvigsfeldė	
Severnaya Gora	Северная Гора	Quednau			
Severnyy	Северный	Marienhöh			
Severnyy	Северный	Klein Kannapinnen, 1938–1946 Kleinblecken		Mažieji Kanapynai	
Severnyy	Северный	Mulk		Severnas	
Severskoye	Северское	Pabbeln, Kreis Gumbinnen			
Severyanka†	Северянка	Neu Posmahlen and Sophienberg			
Sevskoye	Севское	Böttchersdorf			
Shatkovo	Шатково	Stonupönen, 1938–1946 Kaltenbach	Stanupiany		
Shatrovo	Шатрово	Norgehnen, Kreis Fischhausen, 1938–1946 Schugsten, Kreis Samland			
Shatrovo	Шатрово	Weidehnen		Vaidėnai	
Shcheglovka	Щегловка	Groß Brittanien, 1928–1946 Brittanien		Britanija	
Shchegly	Щеглы	Saugwethen, 1938–1946 Saugehnen		Saugviečiai	
Shcherbinino†	Щербинино	Schönrade			
Shchukino	Щукино	Leysuhnen (1938–1945 Leisuhnen) and Schettnienen			
Shchukino	Щукино	Sandlauken, 1938–1946 Sandfelde			since 1993: Novokolkhoznoye
Shepetovka	Шепетовка	Schillkojen, 1938–1946 Auerfließ	Szyłkoje	Šilkojai	
Shevtsovo	Шевцово	Plikow (1938–1946 Plickau)			
Sheykino	Шейкино	Bagdohnen, 1938–1946 Rodungen	Bogdany	Bagdonai	
Shilovo†	Шилово	Pelludschen (Pelludszen), 1938–1946 Pellau, as well as Ischdaggen, 1938–1946 Brenndenwalde			
Shipovka	Шиповка	Bahnhof Powayen			
Shipovnikovo	Шиповниково	Schestocken, 1938–1946 Peterstal			
Shirokopolye	Широкополье	Roppen		Rapai	
Shirokoye	Широкое	Strobehnen and Storchnest, Kreis Preußisch Eylau	Strobajny and Bocianek	Strebainys; Strobėnai	
Shirokoye	Широкое	Packuß, 1938–1945 Kussenberg	Pakus	Pakusai	
Shirokoye†	Широкое	Schönbruch	Szczurkowo		
Shishkovo	Шишково	Schillehlen, 1938–1946 Sillenfelde			
Shishkovo†	Шишково	Kundszicken/Kundschicken, 1938–1946 Sandeck			
Shlyuznoye†	Шлюзное	Woynothen, 1938–1946 Kleinnorkitten		Vainotai	
Shmatovka	Шматовка	(Schwirgsden, 1938–1946 Königsgarten)			
Shmelyovo	Шмелёво	Warnen, Kreis Ragnit/Tilsit-Ragnit		Varnai	
Sholokhovo	Шолохово	Willkinnen, 1938–1946 Willdorf		Vilkiniai	
Sholokhovo	Шолохово	Schelecken, 1938–1946 Schlicken		Šilikai	
Shosseynoye	Шоссейное	Warthen			
Shosseynoye	Шоссейное	Szameitkehmen/Schameitkehmen, 1938–1946; Walkenau, Kreis Insterburg			
Shosseynyy†	Шоссейный	Haffstrom			
Shumnoye	Шумное	Schupöhnen		Skupainys	
Shuvalovo	Шувалово	Groß Wischtecken, 1938–1946 Ullrichsdorf			
Sibirskoye	Сибирское	Moritten, Kreis Labiau		Moryčiai	
Sibirskoye†	Сибирское	Adlig Keppurren, 1938–1946 Kranichfelde			
Sidorovo	Сидорово	Porschkeim			since 1993: Poberezhye (Побережье)
Sinyavino	Синявино	Kampischkehmen, 1938–1946 Angereck		Kampiškiemiai	
Sinyavino	Синявино	Groß Hubnicken			
Sirenevka	Сиреневка	Siemohnen		Simonai	
Sirenevo	Сиренево	Eisselbitten		Aislavyčiai	
Skvortsovo†	Скворцово	Dösen			
Skvortsovo	Скворцово	Kummetischken (Klein Kallningken)			
Simonovo	Симоново	Eckertsberg	Smolin		
Slavinsk	Славинск	Goldbach		Galdė, Auksapiai	
Slavkino	Славкино	Gut Wilhelmsberg			
Slavskoye	Славское	Kreuzburg	Krzyżbork; Krujzbork	Kryžiapilis; Pronyčiai	
Slavyanovka	Славяновка	Romitten			
Slavyanskoye	Славянское	Fuchshöfen			
Slavyanskoye	Славянское	Pronitten		Pravienyčiai	
Slavyanskoye†	Славянское	Kondehnen, Kreis Fischhausen/Samland			
Slobodskoye	Слободское	Wingschnienen, 1938–1946 Ostmoor			now: Malomozhayskoye (Маломожайское)
Smirnovo	Смирново	Kiauten, 1938–1946 Zellmühle	Skórno	Kiautai	
Smolnoye	Смольное	Charlottenburg			
Smorodinovo	Смородиново	Bindszohnen, 1936–1938 Bindschohnen, 1938–1946 Binden		Bindžionai	
Sobinovo	Собиново	Karteningken, 1938–1946 Kleedorf			
Sobolevo	Соболево	Warnien, Kreis Wehlau		Varniai	
Sokolniki†	Сокольники	Grünbaum			
Sokolniki	Сокольники	Langendorf, Kreis Wehlau			
Sokolniki	Сокольники	Weischkitten		Vaiskyčiai	
Sokolovka	Соколовка	Damerau			
Soldatovo	Солдатово	Friedrichsthal			
Soldatovo	Солдатово	Sehmen			
Soldatovo†	Солдатово	Köthen			
Soldatskoye	Солдатское	Lewitten, Pilgrim and Schwellienen			
Solnechnoye	Солнечное	Thomsdorf, Kreis Preußisch Eylau		Tomsdorfas	
Solnechnoye	Солнечное	Praddau			
Solnechnoye	Солнечное	Szameitschen/Schameitschen, 1938–1946 Brahmannsdorf			
Solntsevo	Солнцево	Beryozovka			
Solontsy	Солонцы	Dwarrehlischken, 1930–1950 Herrendorf		Dvareliškiai	
Solontsy†	Солонцы	Adlig Kreywethen, 1938–1946 Adelau			
Solovyovo	Соловьёво	Garbnicken, Kreis Friedland/Bartenstein			
Solovyovo†	Соловьёво	Jessen			
Solovyovo†	Соловьёво	Klein Menturren, 1938–1946 Mentau			
Solovyovo†	Соловьёво	Klein Potauern			
Sopkino	Сопкино	Rosenberg, Kreis Gerdauen			
Sorokino	Сорокино	Groß Skaisgirren, 1938–1946 Großschirren		Didieji Skaisgiriai	
Sosnyaki	Сосняки	Tunnischken, 1938–1946 Schneckenwalde		Tuniškiai	
Sosnyaki†	Сосняки	Pillupönen, Kreis Insterburg, 1938–1946 Kuttenhöh			
Sosnovka	Сосновка	Schwanis		Švanys	
Sosnovka†	Сосновка	Groß- and Klein Labehnen			
Sosnovka	Сосновка	Fritzen			
Sosnovka	Сосновка	Kaveling			
Sosnovka	Сосновка	Scheldkehmen, 1938–1946 Schelden	Zielona Wieś; Sulęty	Želdkiemis	
Sosnovka	Сосновка	Danzkehmen, 1938–1946 Oettingen		Dačkiemis	
Sosnovka	Сосновка	Groß Baum and Augstagirren	Auksztagiry	Aukštagiriai	
Sosnovka	Сосновка	Puschkeiten			
Sosnovka	Сосновка	Bledau			
Sosnovoye	Сосновое	Waldkrug, Stadtkreis Tilsit		Valdkrugas	
Sovetskoye	Советское	Korehlen		Koreliai	
Sovkhoznoye	Совхозное	Groß Köwe			
Sovkhoznoye	Совхозное	Karlshof			
Sovkhoznoye	Совхозное	Mattischkehmen		Matiškiemiai	
Sovkhoznoye	Совхозное	Rippen			
Sovkhoznoye	Совхозное	Sterkeninken, 1938–1946 Starkenicken		Sterkininkai	
Stanovoye	Становое	Norwilkischken, 1938–1946 Argenflur		Norvilkiškiai	
Stantsionnoye	Станционное	Jucknischken, 1938–1946 Bahnfelde			
Starorusskoye	Старорусское	Eythienen			
Staroselye	Староселье	Schultitten (teilw.)			
Stavropolskoye	Ставропольское	Schaumburgsfelde			
Stepnoye	Степное	Powarben			
Stepnoye	Степное	Gaiden		Gaidžiai	
Stepnoye	Степное	Purwienen, 1938–1946 Altweiler		Purvynai	
Stolbovoye	Столбовое	Klein Pruszillen/Pruschillen, 1938–1946 Kleinpreußenbruch			
Storozhevoye	Сторожевое	Katzkeim		Katkiemis	
Storozhevoye†	Сторожевое	Klein Klitten			
Strelnya	Стрельня	Schultitten (teilw.)		Skalučiai	
Streltsovo	Стрельцово	Norgehnen		Nargėnai	
Streltsovo†	Стрельцово	Loyken, 1938–1946 Loken	Łojki	Lokiai	
Sukhodolye	Суходолье	Klein Nuhr	Nur		
Suvorovka	Суворовка	Weedern			
Suvorovo	Суворово	Spandienen			
Suvorovo	Суворово	Zohpen			
Suvorovo	Суворово	Packallnischken, 1938–1946 Bergendorf			now: Yasnoye Pole
Sverdlovo	Свердлово	Linkischken, 1938–1946 Rabeneck	Lenkiszki	Linkiškės	
Svetlovo†	Светлово				
Svetloye	Светлое	Kobbelbude		Kobelbūdė	
Svetloye	Светлое	Langkischken, 1938–1945 Langenwasser	Łankiszki	Lankiškės	
Svoboda	Свобода	Jänischken, 1938–1946 Jänichen	Janiszki	Geniškiai	
Svobodnoye	Свободное	Alsnienen, 1934–1946 Wolmen West			
Svobodnoye	Свободное	Girrehlischken, 1932–1946 Jägerswalde			
Svobodnoye	Свободное	Groß Mischen	Misie Wielkie		
Svobodnoye†	Свободное	Lichtenfelde			
Svobodnoye†	Свободное	Mecken			
Svobodnyy	Свободный	Brandlauken, 1938–1946 Brandfelde			
Sychyovo	Сычёво	Krattlau		Kratlaukis	
Talpaki	Талпаки	Taplacken	Taplaki	Toplaukiai	
Tamanskoye	Таманское	Springen		Springiai	
Tamanskoye†	Таманское	Wilkendorfshof			
Tambovskoye	Тамбовское	Vierzighuben and Karlshof			
Tambovskoye (Rayon Gusev)†	Тамбовское	Aweningken and Skripitschken			
Tambovskoye (Rayon Ozyorsk))†	Тамбовское	Loppinnen			
Tarasovka†	Тарасовка	Alt Sussemilken, 1938–1946 Friedrichsrode		Sinieji Susimilkiai	
Telmanovo	Тельманово	Didlacken, 1938–1946 Dittlacken, along with Althof-Didlacken, 1938–1946 Althof-Dittlacken	Dydlaki	Didlaukiai	
Telmanovo	Тельманово	Richau			
Tikhoye	Тихое	Kiehlendorf			
Tikhomirovka	Тихомировка	Tatarren	Tatary	Totoriai	
Tikhorechenskoye	Тихореченское	(Adlig) Linkau			
Timiryazevo	Тимирязево	Neukirch	Nowy Kościół	Joneikiškiai, Naujoji, Naujėnai	
Timiryazevo	Тимирязево	Newecken, Paplauken and Rauschnick		Raušininkai, Paplaukiai, Nevėkiai	
Timofeyevka	Тимофеевка	Tammowischken, 1938–1946 Tammau		Tamoviškiai	
Timofeyevo	Тимофеево	Wedereitischken, 1938–1946 Sandkirchen, along with Neu Krauleidszen/Neu Krauleidschen, 1938–1946; Sammelhofen	Wederejciszki	Vėderaitiškės, Krauleidžiai	
Tishino	Тишино	Abschwangen		Apušvangis	
Tokarevka	Токаревка	Makunischken, 1938–1946 Hohenwaldeck	Makuniszki	Makūniškiai	
Tolstovo	Толстово	Löbegallen, 1938–1946 Löbenau		Liepgalis	
Tolstovo†	Толстово	Pillkallen, 1938–1946 Hoheneck, Kreis Gumbinnen			
Torfyanoye†	Торфяное	Schlaugen	Dydbały		
Torfyanoye†	Торфяное	Waszeningken, 1936–1938: Wascheningken, 1938–1946 Waschingen			
Tretyakovka	Третьяковка	Daniels			
Tretyakovo	Третьяково	Sodargen	Zodargi	Saudargai	
Tropinino	Тропинино	Heide, Kreis Heiligenbeil		Geidė	
Trostniki	Тростники	Bothenen and Lautkeim			
Trostniki	Тростники	Schakenhof			
Trubkino	Трубкино	Gehlblum			
Trudovoy	Трудовой	Steinfeld		Šteinfeldas	
Tryokhdvorka	Трёхдворка	Paradeningken, 1938–1946 Paradefeld		Parodininkai	
Tulskoye†	Тульское	Kapstücken			
Tumanovka	Тумановка	Gauleden			
Tumanovka	Тумановка	Bartscheiten, 1938–1946 Oswald		Barčaičiai	
Turgenevo	Тургенево	Adlig Legitten, (Groß) Legitten and Jäger-Taktau	Wielkie Legity	Laigyčiai	
Turgenevskoye†	Тургеневское	Ponitt			
Tushino	Тушино	Nettschunen, 1938–1946 Dammfelde, along with Lobellen and Dirwonuppen, 1935–1946 Ackerbach		Nečiūnai, Luobeliai, Dirwonupiai	
Tsvetkovo	Цветково	Wulfshöfen			
Tsvetkovo	Цветково	Bergau			
Tsvetnoye	Цветное	Kallen		Kaldeinė	
Tyomkino	Тёмкино	Mertensdorf			
Tyulenino	Тюленино	Viehof			
Tyumenskoye†	Тюменское	Serguhnen	Żyrguny	Sargūnai	
Udarnoye	Ударное	Ackmenischken, Aulowönen parish, 1938–1946 Steinacker			
Ugryumovo	Угрюмово	Matheningken, 1938–1946 Mattenau		Matininkai	
Ulyanovka	Ульяновка	Klein Hoppenbruch			
Ulyanovo	Ульяново	Kraupischken, 1938–1946 Breitenstein	Krupyszki	Kraupiškas	
Ulyanovo	Ульяново	Waldhöfen			since 1993: Konstantinovka
Ulyanovskoye	Ульяновское	Klein Beynuhnen, 1938–1946 Kleinbeinuhnen	Bejnuny Małe	Mažieji Beiniūnai	
Uralskoye†	Уральское	Almenhausen, Kreis Insterburg			
Urozhaynoye	Урожайное	Lethenen			
Urozhaynoye	Урожайное	Kletellen, 1938–1946 Georgenheide		Klėteliai	
Ushakovka	Ушаковка	Kampken, Kampkenhöfen and Damm			
Ushakovo	Ушаково	Heiligenwalde (Dorf)			
Ushakovo	Ушаково	Brandenburg, 1935–1946 Brandenburg (Frisches Haff)	Pokarmin; Nowe Zgorzelice; Nowezgorzelice	Pokarviai	
Ushakovo	Ушаково	Ströpken	Strupki	Strepkai	
Ushakovo	Ушаково	Pregelau			
Utkino†	Уткино	Wolitta			
Uvarovo	Уварово	Ribbenischken, 1938–1946 Ribbenau	Rybeniszki; Rybiniszki	Ribiniškiai	
Uzlovoye	Узловое	Königlich Neuendorf, 1938–1946 Neuendorf, Kreis Königsberg		Nojendorfas	
Uzlovoye	Узловое	Rautenberg, along with (Groß) Kamanten as well as Barachelen, 1938–1946 Brachfeld			
Uzlovoye†	Узловое	Plagbuden			
Uzornoye†	Узорное	Jäcknitz			
Valki	Вальки	Waldkeim		Valikaimis	
Vasilkovo	Васильково	Neudamm (Dorf)			
Vasilkovo	Васильково	Kirschnehnen		Keršnėnai	
Vasilkovo†	Васильково	Abschruten			
Vasilyevka†	Васильевка	Kurland			
Vasilyevka	Васильевка	Neuhöhe			
Vasilevskoye	Васильевское	Wesselshöfen, Kreis Königsberg/Samland		Veselhefenas	
Vatutino	Ватутино	Gaidszen/Gaidschen, 1938–1946 Drosselbruch		Gaidžiai	
Vatutino	Ватутино	Tutschen		Tučiai	
Vatutino†	Ватутино	Ellernbruch			
Vavilovo	Вавилово	Bregden		Bregdai	
Velikolukskoye	Великолукское	Wargienen, Kreis Wehlau			
Velikolukskoye†	Великолукское	Jutschen, 1938–1946 Weidenbruch		Jučiai	
Velikopolje†	Великополье	Dingort			
Verbnoye	Вербное	Darienen		Darynai	
Verkhniy Biser	Верхний Бисер	Bogdahnen, 1938–1946 Bolzfelde		Bagdonai	
Vernoye	Верное	Pöhlen			
Vershinino	Вершинино	Pluttwinnen		Plutvinai	
Vershinino	Вершинино	Kohlischken, 1928–1946 Hutmühle		Koliškiai	
Vershiny	Вершины	Werschen	Werże		
Vershkovo†	Вершково	Warschken		Varškai	
Vesnovo	Весново	Kussen, along with Bruszen/Bruschen, 1938–1946; Kiesfelde, along with Urblaugken, 1938–1946 Urlau and: Wassantkehmen, 1938–1946 Wildnisrode	Kusy	Kusai	
Vesnovo†	Весново	Wasserlauken, 1938–1946 Wasserlacken		Vasarlaukiai	
Vesyoloye	Весёлое	Balga (locality)			
Vesyolovka	Весёловка	Sielkeim			
Vesyolovka	Весёловка	Bärwalde, Kreis Fischhausen/Samland			
Vesyolovka	Весёловка	Judtschen, 1938–1946 Kanthausen			
Vesyolyy	Весёлый	Linkehnen			
Vetkino†	Веткино	Stapornen		Stupurai	
Vetrovo	Ветрово	Schölen		Šėliai	
Vetrovo	Ветрово	Woydehnen, 1938–1946 Wodehnen and Schuppinnen, 1938–1946 Schuppen		Vaidėnai, Žiupinėnai	
Vetrovo	Ветрово	Ekritten			
Vetryak†	Ветряк	Kiaunen, 1938–1946 Rodenheim		Kiauniai	
Vinogradnoye	Виноградное	Schaudienen, 1938–1946 Konrhöfen		Šaudynai	
Vishnyaki†	Вишняки	Galben			
Vishnyovka	Вишнёвка	Blöstau			
Vishnyovka	Вишнёвка	Lyscheiten/Lyscheiten, 1938–1946 Lischau, and Gräflich Reatischken, 1938–1946 Heinrichshof		Lysaičiai, Ratiškės	
Vishnyovka†	Вишнёвка	Budszedszen, 1936–1938 Budschedschen, 1938–1946 Pfälzerwalde			
Vishnyovoye	Вишнёвое	Altendorf			
Vishnyovoye†	Вишнёвое	Dejehnen (1938–1946 Dehnen), Paballen (1938–1946 Werfen) and Uszelxnen (1936–1938 Uschelxnen, 1938–1946 Erlenbruch), all in Kreis Tilsit-Ragnit, as well as Medukallen (1938–1946 Honigberg), Kreis Insterburg		Medukalniai, Dejainys, Pabaliai & Užalksniai	
Vishnyovoye	Вишнёвое	Kapkeim			
Vishnyovoye†	Вишнёвое	Kummeln			
Vishnyovoye	Вишнёвое	Wosegau		Vozgava	
Vladimirovka	Владимировка	Bladau		Bladava	
Vladimirovka†	Владимировка	Klein Sobrost, Kreis Darkehmen/Angerapp	Kozłówko		
Vladimirovo	Владимирово	Tharau and Ernsthof		Toruva	
Vladimirovo	Владимирово	Bladau		Bladava	since 2008: Vladimirovka
Vodnoye	Водное	Syndau		Sindava	
Volkovo	Волково	Rudne, 1936–1938 Raudohnen, 1938–1946; Raunen			
Volnoye	Вольное	Wollehlen	Żamajcie	Valeliai	
Volnoye	Вольное	Wolla, 1938–1946 Ebenau	Wola	Volia	
Volnoye	Вольное	Gut Schulstein		Šulšteinas	
Volochayevo	Волочаево	Raudonatschen, 1938–1946 Kattenhof		Raudonaičiai	
Volochayevo†	Волочаево	Grischkehmen, 1938–1946 Grischken			
Volochayevskoye	Волочаевское	Marschenen			
Volodarovka	Володаровка	Jodlauken, 1938–1946 Schwalbental	Jodlauki	Juodlaukiai	
Volodino†	Володино	Woytnicken		Vaitninkai	
Volodino†	Володино	Harpenthal			
Voloshino	Волошино	Brasnicken		Brazininkai	
Volzhskoye†	Волжское	Schmerkstein and Steinhof			
Vorobyovo	Воробьёво	Groß Hohenrade			
Vorobyovo†	Воробьёво	Grünwiese, Kreis Stallupönen/Ebenrode			
Voronovo	Вороново	(Alt) Kainen and Louisenhof		Kainai	
Voronovo†	Вороново	Uszbundszen	Użbundzie		
Vorotynovka	Воротыновка	Errehlen, 1938–1946 Rehlen, Sakalehnen, 1938–1946 Falkenort and Szierandszen/Schierandschen, 1938–1946 Schierheide	Szyrandze	Sakalėliai	
Voskresenskoye	Воскресенское	Groß Uszballen, 1938–1946 Bruchhöfen		Užbaliai	
Vostochnoye†	Восточное	Klein Sporwitten			
Vostochnoye†	Восточное	Stukatschen, 1938–1946 Freienfeld	Stukujcie		
Voynovo†	Войново	Döbnicken and Barslack			
Voznesenskoye	Вознесенское	Wenzlowischken, 1938–1946 Wenzbach	Węcławiszki; Węcłowiszki	Vencloviškiai	
Vozvyshenka	Возвышенка	Groß Kummeln, 1938–1946 Großkummen	Wielkie Kumele	Didieji Kumeliai	
Vyselki	Выселки	Klein Degesen, 1938–1946 Kleinlucken		Mažieji Degėsiai	
Vyshkino†	Вышкино	Königshuld I			
Vysokoye	Высокое	Tiefenthal		Tifentalis	
Vysokoye†	Высокое	Trinkheim			
Vysokoye	Высокое	Pogauen			
Vysokoye	Высокое	Alxnupönen, 1938–1946 Altsnappen		Alksnupėnai	
Vysokoye	Высокое	Schilleningken, 1938–1946 Hainau	Szylininki	Šilininkai	
Vysokoye	Высокое	Popelken, Kreis Labiau, 1938–1946 Markthausen	Popielki	Papelkiai	
Vzmorye	Взморье	Groß Heydekrug, 1939–1946 Großheidekrug	Zajazdowo	Grosheidekrugas	
Yablochkino†	Яблочкино	Lokehnen			
Yablochnoye	Яблочное	Eichhorn, Kreis Insterburg		Eichhornas	
Yablonevka	Яблоневка	Lichtenhagen, Kreis Königsberg			
Yablonovka	Яблоновка	Bartenhof			
Yablonovka	Яблоновка	Wilhelmsberg	Klikucie	Klikučiai	
Yagodnoye	Ягодное	Lindendorf			
Yagodnoye	Ягодное	Bredauen		Bredūnai; Briedūnai	
Yagodnoye	Ягодное	Bittehnen, 1938–1946 Biehnendorf	Bitejny	Bitėnai	
Yagodnoye	Ягодное	Kapsitten			
Yagodnoye	Ягодное	Bersnicken			
Yakovlevka†	Яковлевка	Pellkawen, 1938–1945: Pellkauen	Pełkowo	Pelkaviai	
Yakovlevo	Яковлево	Jakobsdorf, Kreis Wehlau			
Yamskoye	Ямское	Katharinenhof, Kreis Preußisch Eylau			
Yantarnyy	Янтарный	Palmnicken	Palmniki	Palvininkai	
Yantarovka	Янтаровка	Wangnicken, Kreis Fischhausen/Samland			
Yarki	Ярки	Karpau		Karpava	
Yaroslavskoye	Ярославское	Schönwalde, Kreis Königsberg/Samland			
Yaroslavskoye†	Ярославское	Schlakalken			
Yarovoye	Яровое	Gertschen, 1938–1946 Gertenau		Gerčiai	
Yarovoye†	Яровое	Wange			
Yasenskoye	Ясеньское	(Groß) Kuglack		Kaukalaukis	
Yasnaya Polyana	Ясная Поляна	(Groß) Trakehnen	Trakeny; Trakiany	Trakėnai	
Yasnaya Polyana†	Ясная Поляна	Diedersdorf			
Yasnopolyanka	Яснополянка	Spucken, 1938–1946 Stucken		Špukai	
Yasnopolskoye	Яснопольское	Auxkallen, Pelleningken parish, 1938–1946; Hoheninster		Aukštkalniai	
Yasnoye	Ясное	Kaukehmen, 1938–45 Kuckerneese	Kaukiejmy	Kaukėnai, Kaukiemis	
Yasnoye	Ясное	Packerau, Kreis Heiligenbeil			
Yasnoye†	Ясное	Lönhöfen			
Yasnoye Pole	Ясное Поле	Packallnischken, 1938–1946 Bergendorf, along with Krausenwalde	Pokalniszki		
Yegoryevskoye	Егорьевское	Sellwethen			
Yelanovka†	Елановка	Wackern	Wakarowo		
Yelniki	Ельники	Kanten			
Yelniki	Ельники	Weidlacken		Veidlaukiai, Žakai	
Yelnikovo	Ельниково	Neu Kirschnabeck, 1938–1946 Kleinhirschdorf		Kiršnabėkis	
Yelnino†	Елнино	Gertlack			
Yelnyaki	Ельняки	Frischenau			
Yelovoye	Еловое	Kasenowsken, 1935–1946 Tannsee	Kazanowskie	Kaženovskiai	
Yermakovo	Ермаково	Deutsch Wilten			
Yermolovo†	Ермолово	Klein Scharlack	Mały Szarlok		
Yershovo	Ершово	Grünlinde, Kreis Wehlau			
Yershovo†	Ершово	Blankenau			
Yudino	Юдино	Blecken		Blėkiai	
Yudino	Юдино	Jurgaitschen, 1938–1946 Jürgenfelde	Jurgajcie	Jurgaičiai	
Yuzhnyy	Южный	Jesau and Katharinenhof	Jazowo		
Yuzhnyy	Южный	Aweiden and Speichersdorf			
Zabarye	Забарье	Moterau			
Zabolotnoye†	Заболотное	Groß Warningken, 1938–1946: Steinkirch		Varninkai	
Zadorozhye	Задорожье	Mallenuppen, 1938–1946 Gembern			
Zadorozhye†	Задорожье	Ramoschkehmen, 1938–1946 Ramfelde			
Zadorozhye†	Задорожное	Dinglauken, 1938–1946 Altdingelau			
Zagorodnoye	Загородное	Schloditten	Skłodyty	Sklodyčiai	
Zagorodnoye	Загородное	Neuendorf, Kreis Insterburg			
Zagorskoye	Загорское	Sommerau		Zaumarai	
Zagorskoye	Загорское	Pelleningken, 1938–1946 Strigengrund	Peleninki	Peleninkai	
Zagoryevka	Загорьевка	Kaukern		Kaukarai	
Zalesye	Залесье	Mehlauken, 1938–1946 Liebenfelde	Mieławki; Melanki	Mielaukiai	
Zalesye†	Залесье	Neu Sollau			
Zalivino	Заливино	Labagienen, 1938–1946 Haffwinkel		Labagynas	
Zalivino†	Заливино	Rinderort			
Zalivnoye	Заливное	Postnicken	Postniki	Paustininkai	
Zamostye	Замостье	Klein Datzen			
Zaostrovye	Заостровье	Rantau		Rantava	
Zaovrazhnoye	Заовражное	Schwägerau		Švogerava	
Zaozyornoye	Заозёрное	Jänischken, 1938–1946 Hansruh		Geniškiai, Tutliai	
Zaosyornoye	Заозёрное	Kowarren, 1938–1946 Kleinfriedeck	Kowary	Kovarai	
Zaozyornoye†	Заозёрное	Lindenberg, Kreis Königsberg/Samland			
Zaozyorye	Заозёрье	Lapsau, Tharaunenkrug and Wangnicken		Lapsava, Taraunė & Vangininkai	
Zapadnoye	Западное	Groß Gudellen, 1938–1946 Großguden	Gudele Wielkie		
Zapolye	Заполье	Friedrichsfelde, Darkehmen parish		Pagrabiai	
Zapovedniki	Заповедники	Lucknojen, 1938–1946 Neuenrode	Łuknoje	Luknojai	
Zapovednoye	Заповедное	Seckenburg	Wielkie Krzyżany	Kryžionai	
Zarechenskoye	Зареченское	(Groß) Sobrost			
Zarechnoye	Заречное	Ramsen, Dopsattel and Liepnicken			
Zarechnoye	Заречное	Tulpeningken, 1938–1946 Tulpeningen, and Woitekaten, 1938–1946 Ostfurt	Tulpeninki	Tulpininkai & Vaitikaičiai	
Zarechnoye†	Заречное	Oberwalde			
Zarechye	Заречье	Kaymen, 1938–1946 Kaimen		Kaimė	
Zarechye	Заречье	Pregelswalde, Kreis Wehlau			
Zarechye	Заречье	Schwirgslauken, 1938–1946 Herzfelde (Ostpreußen)		Žvirgzlaukiai	
Zarechye†	Заречье	Meisterfelde			
Zarechye	Заречье	Uszupönen, 1936–1938 Uschupönen, 1938–1945 Moorhof, Kreis Gumbinnen		Užupėnai	
Zarubino	Зарубино	Klein Gaudischkehmen, 1938–1946; Kleingauden		Mažasis Gaudiškiemis	
Zaruchye	Заручье	Gudwainen			
Zarya	Заря	Groß Wersmeningken, 1938–1946; Großstangenwald		Didieji Versmininkai	
Zavetnoye†	Заветное	Groß Nuhr			
Zavety	Заветы	Kattenau			
Zavodskoye	Заводское	Swirgallen/Schwirgallen, 1938–1946 Eichhagen		Žvyrgaliai	
Zaytsevo	Зайцево	Trentitten			
Zaytsevo	Зайцево	Seikwethen, 1938–1946 Ulmental		Seikviečiai	
Zaytsevo	Зайцево	Stockheim			
Zelenodolskoye	Зеленодольское	Preußisch Bahnau			
Zelenodolye	Зеленодолье	Neu Lubönen, 1938–1946 Memelwalde		Naujieji Liubėnai	
Zelenolesye	Зеленолесье	Gricklaugken, 1938–1946 Bönick		Griklaukiai	
Zelenopolye	Зеленополье	Borchersdorf			
Zelenopolye	Зеленополье	Krumteich			
Zelenovo	Зеленово	Minchenwalde, 1938–1946 Lindenhorst			
Zelenovo†	Зеленово	Adlig Pinnau and Pinnau			
Zelentsovo	Зеленцово	Grünthal			
Zelentsovo	Зеленцово	Obehlischken, 1938–1946 Schulzenhof	Obeliszki	Obeliškiai	
Zelyonaya Dolina	Зелёная Долина	Klein Niebudszen/Klein Niebudschen, 1938–1946 Bärengraben			
Zelyonoye	Зелёное	Grünhaus		Lenkišiai	
Zelyonoye	Зелёное	Gründen and Pareyken, 1938–1946 Goldberg			
Zelyonyy Bor	Зелёный Бор	Karalene, 1938–1946 Luisenberg		Karalienė	
Zelyonyy Gay	Зелёный Гай	(Groß) Drebnau		Didžioji Drebnuva	
Zharovo	Жарово	Szardehlen/Schardehlen, 1938–1946 Scharden, along with Martingken, 1938–1946 Martingen		Žardeliai & Martinkai	
Zharovo (Rayon Neman)	Жарово	Schuppinnen, 1938–1946 Schuppenau			now: Vetrovo ( (Ветрово)
Zhavoronkovo	Жаворонково	Gerwischken, 1938–1946 Richtfelde		Gerviškiai	
Zhavoronkovo	Жаворонково	Wirbeln, Kreis Insterburg	Wirble	Virbliai	
Zhdanki	Жданки	Tilszenehlen/Tilschenehlen, 1938–1946; Quellgründen, along with Pellehnen, 1938–1946 Dreidorf		Tilženėliai, Pelėnai	
Zhelannoye	Желанное	Henskischken, 1938–1946 Hensken		Enskiškiai	
Zheleznodorozhnoye†	Железнодорожное	Groß Trakischken, 1938–1946 Hohenrode	Trakiszki Wielkie		
Zheleznodorozhnoye	Железнодорожное	Karczarningken, 1929–1946 Blumenfeld		Karčiarninkai	
Zheleznodorozhnyy	Железнодорожный	Gerdauen	Gierdawy	Girdava	
Zheludyovo	Желудёво	Prosit			
Zhemchuzhnoye	Жемчужное	Kirche Schaaken			
Zhiguli	Жигули	Reckeln		Rėkliai	
Zhigulyovo	Жигулёво	Tannenrode			
Zhigulyovo†	Жигулёво	Wittgirren, 1938–1946 Legen			
Zhilino	Жилино	Szillen, 1938–1946 Schillen	Szyły	Žiliai	
Zhuchkovo	Жучково	Schuskehmen (Szuskehmen), 1938–1946; Angerhöh			
Zhukovka	Жуковка	Quilitten		Kvilyčiai	
Zhuravlyovka	Журавлёвка	Groß Droosden and Seith	Drozdy		
Zlatoustye†	Златоустье	Eromeiten, 1938–1945 Ehrenfelde		Eromaičiai	
Znamenka	Знаменка	Groß Hoppenbruch		Znamenka	
Znamenka	Знаменка	Bruch			
Znamenka	Знаменка	Leegen		Lėgiai	
Znamenka	Знаменка	Klinthenen	Klintejny		
Znamensk	Знаменск	Wehlau	Welawa; Iława	Vėluva	
Znamenskoye	Знаменское	Kutschitten	Kucyty		
Znamenskoye	Знаменское	Preußisch Wilten			
Znamenskoye†	Знаменское	Triaken, 1938–1946 Schwerfelde			
Zorino	Зорино	Poppendorf			
Zorino†	Зорино	Littausdorf			
Zuyevka	Зуевка	Rogainen, 1938–1946 Hornfelde		Rogainiai	
Zvenyevoye	Звеньевое	Popehnen			
Zverevo	Зверево	Gotthardsthal			
Zverevo	Зверево	Christoplacken and Zanderlacken			now: Brigadnoye (Бригадное)
Zverevo	Зверево	Wandlacken			
Zvyagintsevo	Звягинцево	Waschke		Vaškiai	
†		Auxinnen, 1938–1945 Freudenau	Auksyny	Auksiniai	
†		Billehnen, 1938–1945 Billenau	Byliny	Bilėnai	
†		Binnenwalde	Puszczyki		
?		Dubinnen, 1938–1945 Duben	Dubiny	Dubiniai	
?		Ellermühle	Olszewka		
?		Eszerkehmen	Eszerkiejmy		
?		Freiberg	Wapiennik		
?		Groblischken, 1938–1945 Ringfelde	Grobliszki	Grobliškės	
†		Jerusalem	Jerozolima		
?		Kiauten-Eisenhütte	Skórzeńska Ruda		
?		Klein Gudellen, 1938–1945 Kleinguden	Gudele Małe		
?		Klein Pellkawen, 1938–1945: Klein Pellkauen	Pełkówko		
?		Klein Rominten, 1938–1945 Kleinhardteck	Rominty Małe	Romintai	
?		Klein Trakischken, 1938–1945 Kleinhohenrode	Trakiszki Małe	Trakiškiai	
?		Klein Kallweitschen, 1938–1945 Kleinkornberg	Mściszki Małe		
?		Kraginnen, 1938–1945 Kraghof	Kraginy	Kraginai	
?		Lawsken	Ławskie		
?		Liep	Lipa		
?		Neu Pellkawen, 1938–1945: Neu Pellkauen	Nowe Pełkowo		
?		Roponatschen, 1938–1945: Steinheide	Roponacie	Roponaičiai	
?		Sausleszowen, 1938–1945: Seefelden	Leszczkowo	Sausliežuviai	
?		Theweln, 1938–1945: Pfalzberg	Tewele	Tėveliai	
?		Wannaginnen, 1938–1945: Wangenheim	Wanaginy	Vanagynas	
†		Budweitschen, 1938–1945 Altenwacht	Budwiecie Żytkiejmskie	Budvaičiai	
†		Jodupönen, 1938–1946 Grenzhof	Jodupiany		
†		Klein Kummetschen, 1938–1945 Schäferberg	Kumiecie Małe		
†		Korschelken	Chorzelki		
†		Kuiken, 1938–1945 Albrechtsrode	Kujki Górne	Kuikiai	
†		Kumpelken, 1938–1945 Kämpen	Kąpielki	Kumpelkiai	
†		Matzutkehmen, 1938–1945 Wellenhausen	Maciejkowo	Močiutkiemis	
†		Meszehnen, 1938–1945 Wehrfeld	Mieżany		
†		Mehlawischken	Melawiszki	Melaviškės	
†		Narmeln	Polski		
?		Plicken	Pliki		
†		Pötschlauken, 1938–1945 Peterort	Czepin	Pečlaukiai	
?		Romanuppen, 1938–1946 Mildenheim	Mulwin	Ramonupiai	
†		Warkallen, 1938–1945 Wartenstein	Warkały	Varkalai	

== Maps ==
Maps of the oblast with Russian (Cyrillic and Romanized) and former German placenames

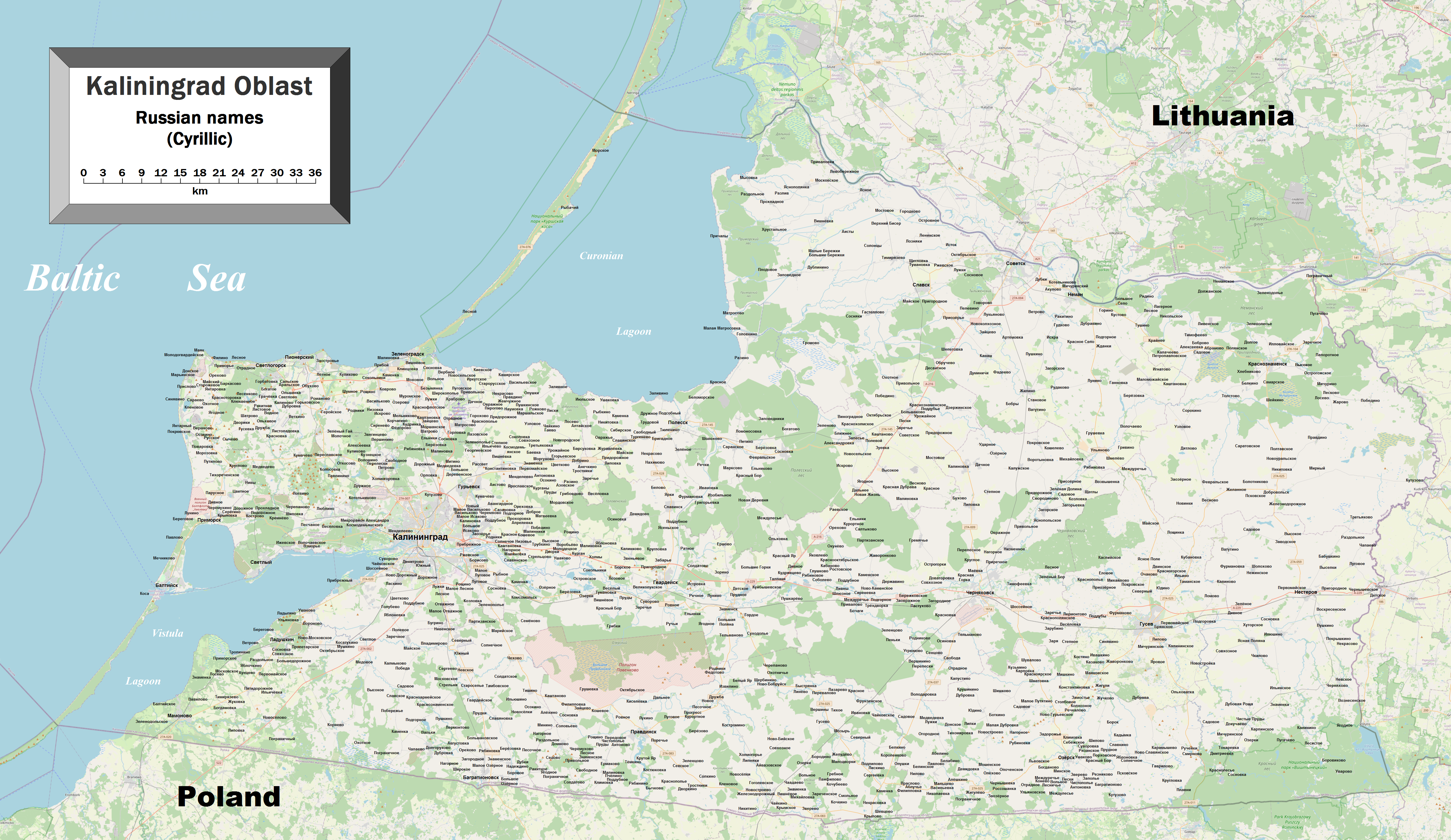
Russian Cyrillic

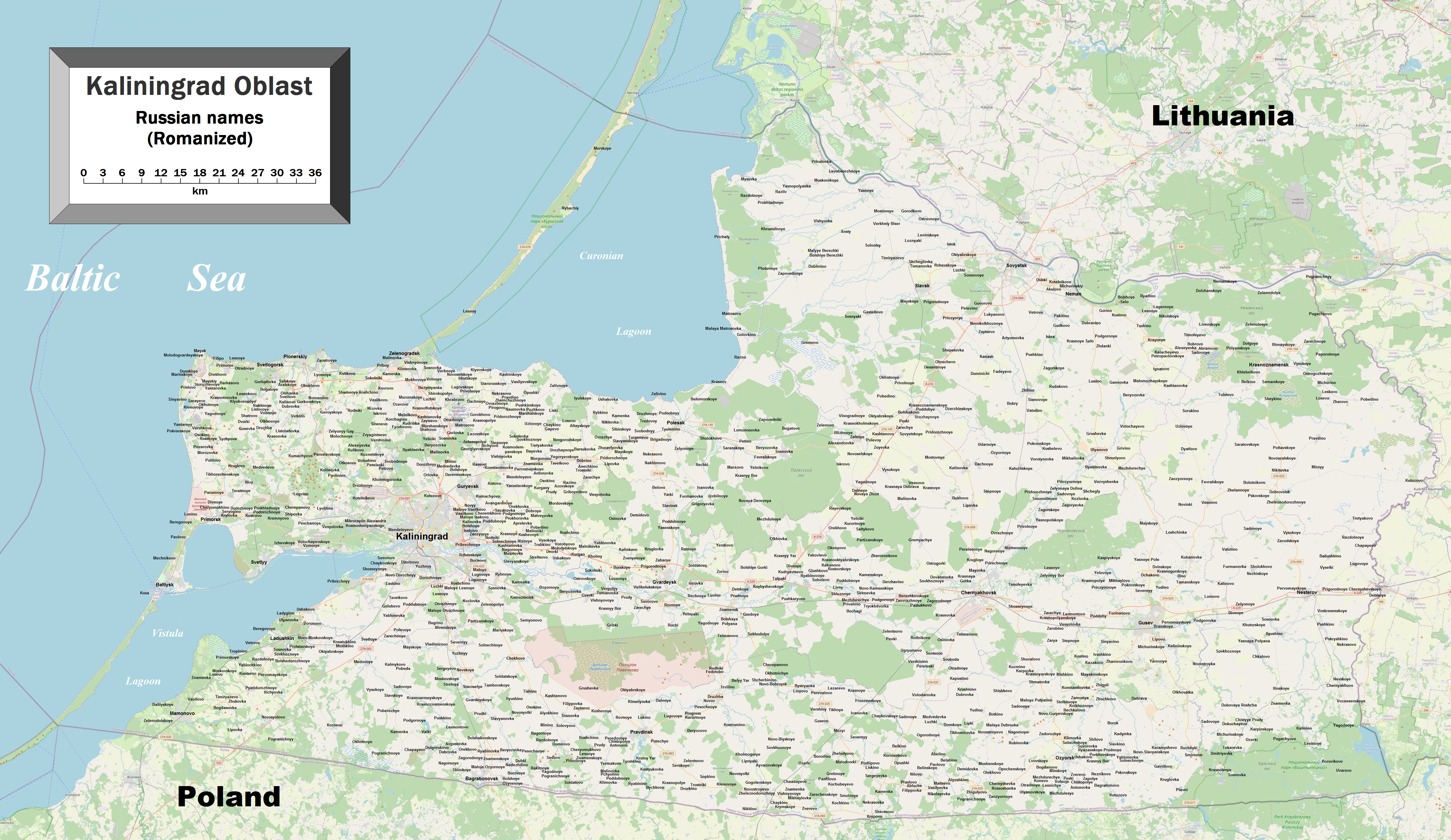
Russian Romanized

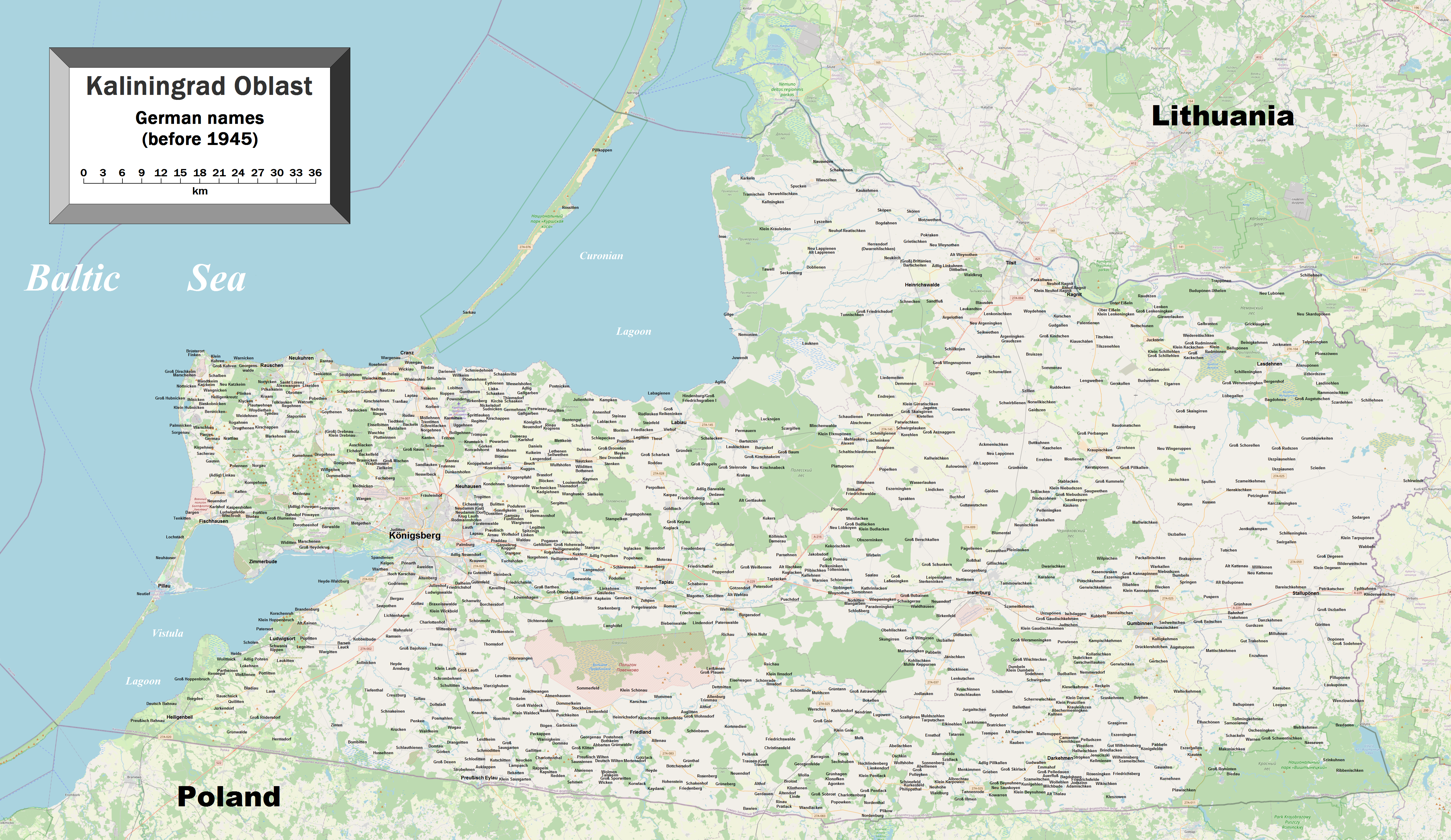
German

== See also ==
- List of cities and towns in East Prussia
- List of German places names for the inhabited localities in Kaliningrad Oblast

== Bibliography ==
- Skorowidz Niemiecko-Polski i Polsko-Niemiecki miast, miasteczek i większych wsi Prus Książęcych i Królewskich, W. Ks. Poznańskiego i Śląska (in Polish). Warszawa: Zakłady Graficzne Ministerstwa Spraw Wojsk. 1919.
- Słownik geograficzny Królestwa Polskiego i innych krajów słowiańskich, Tom I (in Polish). Warszawa. 1880.
- Słownik geograficzny Królestwa Polskiego i innych krajów słowiańskich, Tom II (in Polish). Warszawa. 1881.
- Słownik geograficzny Królestwa Polskiego i innych krajów słowiańskich, Tom III (in Polish). Warszawa. 1882.
- Słownik geograficzny Królestwa Polskiego i innych krajów słowiańskich, Tom IV (in Polish). Warszawa. 1883.
- Słownik geograficzny Królestwa Polskiego i innych krajów słowiańskich, Tom V (in Polish). Warszawa. 1884.
- Słownik geograficzny Królestwa Polskiego i innych krajów słowiańskich, Tom VI (in Polish). Warszawa. 1885.
- Słownik geograficzny Królestwa Polskiego i innych krajów słowiańskich, Tom VII (in Polish). Warszawa. 1886.
- Słownik geograficzny Królestwa Polskiego i innych krajów słowiańskich, Tom VIII (in Polish). Warszawa. 1887.
- Słownik geograficzny Królestwa Polskiego i innych krajów słowiańskich, Tom IX (in Polish). Warszawa. 1888.
- Słownik geograficzny Królestwa Polskiego i innych krajów słowiańskich, Tom X (in Polish). Warszawa. 1889.
- Słownik geograficzny Królestwa Polskiego i innych krajów słowiańskich, Tom XI (in Polish). Warszawa. 1890.
- Słownik geograficzny Królestwa Polskiego i innych krajów słowiańskich, Tom XII (in Polish). Warszawa. 1892.
- Słownik geograficzny Królestwa Polskiego i innych krajów słowiańskich, Tom XIII (in Polish). Warszawa. 1893.
- Kętrzyński, Wojciech (1882). O ludności polskiej w Prusiech niegdyś krzyżackich (in Polish). Lwów: Zakład Narodowy im. Ossolińskich.
- Zarański, Stanisław (1878). Geograficzne imiona słowiańskie zestawione alfabetycznie według nazw ich niemieckich, włoskich, rumuńskich, węgierskich i tureckich, z dodaniem niektórych łotyskich i innych zagranicznych spolszczonych (in Polish). Kraków.
