= Yakovlevka, Kaliningrad Oblast =

Former settlement in Kaliningrad Oblast

Yakovlevka Яковлевка
- Rural locality
- Interactive map of Yakovlevka
- Location of Yakovlevka Yakovlevka (European Russia) Yakovlevka (Russia)
- Coordinates: 54°22′8″N 22°39′36″E
- Country: Russia

Population
  - Estimate (2021): 0 )

Yakovlevka (Russian: Яковлевка, Polish: Pełkowo) is an abandoned village in Nesterovsky District of Kaliningrad Oblast, Russia, on the border with Poland. It is located in the region of Masuria.

Initially following World War II, in 1945, the village passed to Poland under its historic Polish name Pełkowo, however, it was eventually annexed by the Soviet Union and renamed to Yakovlevka.
