= Peschanoye, Kaliningrad Oblast =

Rural locality in Kaliningrad Oblast, Russia

Coordinates: 54°43′30″N 20°14′40″E

Peschanoye (Russian: Песча́ное, German: Dorotheenhof) is a rural locality (a village) under the administrative jurisdiction of the town of oblast significance of Svetly in Kaliningrad Oblast, Russia. Population: 17 (2010 census); 29 (2002 census);
