= Ladygino =

Ladygino Ладыгино
- Village
- Location within Vologda Oblast Location within Russia
- Coordinates: 59°14′N 37°42′E
- Country: Russia
- Region: Vologda Oblast
- District: Cherepovetsky District
- Time zone: UTC+3:00

Ladygino (Russian: Ладыгино) is a rural locality (a village) in Abakanovskoye Rural Settlement, Cherepovetsky District, Vologda Oblast, Russia. The population was 15 as of 2002. There are four streets.

== Geography ==
Ladygino is located 28 km (17 mi) northwest of Cherepovets (the district's administrative centre) by road. Korablevo is the nearest rural locality.
