= Chaadayevo =

Chaadayevo Чаадаево
- Selo
- Location within Vladimir Oblast Location within Russia
- Coordinates: 55°40′N 42°01′E
- Country: Russia
- Region: Vladimir Oblast
- District: Muromsky District
- Time zone: UTC+3:00

Chaadayevo (Russian: Чаада́ево) is a rural locality (a selo) in Borisoglebskoye Rural Settlement, Muromsky District, Vladimir Oblast, Russia. The population was 972 as of 2010. There are 14 streets.

== Geography ==
Chaadayevo is located 13 km north of Murom (the district's administrative centre) by road. Borisovo is the nearest rural locality.
