= Pereleski, Chernyakhovsky District, Kaliningrad Oblast =

Pereleski Перелески
- posyolok
- Location within Kaliningrad Oblast Location within Russia
- Coordinates: 54°31′54″N 21°40′56″E
- Country: Russia
- Region: Kaliningrad Oblast
- District: Chernyakhovsky District
- Time zone: UTC+2:00

Pereleski (Russian: Переле́ски, German: Mühle Keppurren (Friedrichsmühle), Lithuanian: Kepuriai) is a rural locality (a posyolok) in Chernyakhovsky District, Kaliningrad Oblast, Russia. Population: 0 (2010 census);
