= Zhilino =

Zhilino Жилино
- Village
- Location within Bashkortostan Location within Russia
- Coordinates: 54°39′N 56°03′E
- Country: Russia
- Region: Bashkortostan
- District: Ufa
- Time zone: UTC+5:00

Zhilino (Russian: Жилино; Bashkir: Жилино, Jilino) is a rural locality (a village) in Ufa, Bashkortostan, Russia. The population was 170 as of 2010. There are 25 streets.

== Geography ==
Zhilino is located 15 km southeast of Ufa. Karpovo is the nearest rural locality.
