= Morskoye =

Morskoye Морское
- Selo
- Location within Republic of Dagestan Location within Russia
- Coordinates: 42°14′N 48°08′E
- Country: Russia
- Region: Republic of Dagestan
- District: Dakhadayevsky District
- Time zone: UTC+3:00

Morskoye (Russian: Морское) is a rural locality (a selo) in Dakhadayevsky District, Republic of Dagestan, Russia. The population was 1,186 as of 2010. There are 7 streets.

== Geography ==
Morskoye is located 65 km east of Urkarakh (the district's administrative centre) by road. Chishili and Buskri are the nearest rural localities.
