= Gayevo, Kaliningrad Oblast =

Gayevo Гаево
- Rural locality
- Interactive map of Gayevo
- Location of Gayevo Gayevo (European Russia) Gayevo (Russia)
- Coordinates: 54°51′14″N 20°48′6″E
- Country: Russia
- Federal subject: Kaliningrad Oblast
- Administrative district: Guryevsky District
- First mentioned: 1405

Population (2010 Census)
  - Total: 57
  - Estimate (2010): 57 (0%)
- Time zone: UTC+2 (MSK–1)
- Postal code: 238317
- OKTMO ID: 27707000656

Gayevo (Russian: Га́ево) is a rural locality (Russian: село, lit. 'village') in Kaliningrad Oblast, Russia.

== History ==
The village was mentioned in 1405. In 1454, King Casimir IV Jagiellon incorporated the region to the Kingdom of Poland upon the request of the anti-Teutonic Prussian Confederation. After the subsequent Thirteen Years' War (1454–1466) the settlement became a part of Poland as a fief held by the Teutonic Knights and Ducal Prussia. From the 18th century, it was part of the Kingdom of Prussia, and from 1871 it was also part of Germany, within which it was administratively located in the province of East Prussia. After Germany's defeat in World War II it was annexed by the Soviet Union. Prior to annexation to the Soviet Union, the village was known as Cropiens in German or Kruopynai in the Lithuanian language which both derive from Krōpīnō in Old Prussian. This village was the birthplace of Lithuanian painter Pranas Domšaitis who painted landscapes of the vicinity.

The contemporary Russian name of the settlement derives from gaj, the Slavic word for grove which is not uncommon for place names in Central and Eastern Europe.
