= Nechayevo =

Nechayevo Нечаево
- Selo
- Location within Belgorod Oblast Location within Russia
- Coordinates: 50°41′N 37°08′E
- Country: Russia
- Region: Belgorod Oblast
- District: Korochansky District
- Time zone: UTC+3:00

Nechayevo (Russian: Нечаево) is a rural locality (a selo) in Korochansky District, Belgorod Oblast, Russia. The population was 344 as of 2010. There are 11 streets.

== Geography ==
Nechayevo is located 16 km south of Korocha (the district's administrative centre) by road. Tyurino is the nearest rural locality.
