= List of rural localities in Kaliningrad Oblast =

Map of Russia with Kaliningrad Oblast highlighted

This is a list of rural localities in Kaliningrad Oblast. Kaliningrad Oblast (Russian: Калинингра́дская о́бласть, Kaliningradskaya oblast), often referred to as the Kaliningrad Region in English, or simply Kaliningrad, is a federal subject of the Russian Federation that is located on the coast of the Baltic Sea. As an oblast, its constitutional status is equal to each of the other 85 federal subjects. Its administrative center is the city of Kaliningrad, formerly known as Königsberg. It is the only Baltic port in the Russian Federation that remains ice-free in winter. According to the 2010 census, it had a population of 941,873. The oblast is a semi-exclave, bordered by Poland to the south and Lithuania to the east and north, so residents may only travel visa-free to the rest of Russia via sea or air.

== Bagrationovsky District ==
Rural localities in Bagrationovsky District:

- Avgustovka
- Bogatovo
- Chekhovo
- Dolgorukovo
- Dubrovka
- Furmanovo
- Gvardeyskoye
- Kornevo
- Maloye Ozyornoye
- Novosyolki
- Pyatidorozhnoye
- Rakitnoye
- Slavskoye
- Tishino

== Baltiysky District, Kaliningrad Oblast ==
Rural localities in Baltiysky District:

- Divnoye
- Parusnoye

== Chernyakhovsky District ==
Rural localities in Chernyakhovsky District:

- Derzhavino
- Gremyachye
- Pridorozhnoye
- Privolnoye
- Telmanovo
- Volodarovka
- Zagorskoye

== Guryevsky ==
Rural localities in Guryevsky urban okrug:

- Ushakovo

== Guryevsky District ==
Rural localities in Guryevsky District:

- Avangardnoye
- Kutuzovo
- Malinniki
- Mendeleyevo
- Roshchino
- Uzlovoye
- Vasilevskoye

== Gusevsky District ==
Rural localities in Gusevsky District:

- Lomovo
- Mayakovskoye
- Novostroyka

== Gvardeysky District ==
Rural localities in Gvardeysky District:

- Bolshaya Polyana
- Talpaki
- Znamensk

== Krasnoznamensky District ==
Rural localities in Krasnoznamensky District:

- Kutuzovo
- Nemanskoye
- Sadovo

== Mamonovo ==
- Vavilovo

== Nemansky District ==
- Malomozhayskoye
- Ulyanovo

== Nesterovsky District ==
Rural localities in Nesterovsky District:

- Chernyshevskoye
- Chistye Prudy
- Krasnolesye
- Kalinino
- Tokarevka
- Yagodnoye
- Yasnaya Polyana
- Zavodskoye
- Zelyonoye

== Ozyorsky District ==
Rural localities in Ozyorsky District:

- Donskoye
- Karamyshevo
- Kazachye
- Krasnoyarskoye
- Kutuzovo
- Maltsevo
- Nekrasovo
- Otradnoye
- Plavni
- Reznikovo
- Smirnovo

== Polessky District ==
Rural localities in Polessky District:

- Nekrasovo
- Saranskoe
- Sibirskoye

== Pravdinsky District ==
Rural localities in Pravdinsky District:

- Belkino
- Bychkovo
- Domnovo
- Druzhba
- Gusevo
- Kochkino
- Krylovo
- Novoye
- Panfilovo

== Slavsky District ==
Rural localities in Slavsky District:

- Bolshakovo
- Gromovo

== Svetly ==
Rural localities in Svetly urban okrug:

- Lyublino

== Zelenogradsky District ==
Rural localities in Zelenogradsky District:

- Kulikovo
- Kumachyovo
- Lesnoy
- Logvino
- Mokhovoye
- Roshchino
- Rybachy
- Voloshino

== See also ==
- Lists of rural localities in Russia
