= Kutuzovo =

Kutuzovo (Russian: Кутузово) is the name of several rural localities in Russia:

- Kutuzovo, Guryevsky District, a settlement in Kutuzovsky Rural Okrug of Guryevsky District of Kaliningrad Oblast
- Kutuzovo, Krasnoznamensky District, Kaliningrad Oblast, a settlement in Dobrovolsky Rural Okrug of Krasnoznamensky District of Kaliningrad Oblast
- Kutuzovo, Ozyorsky District, a settlement in Gavrilovsky Rural Okrug of Ozyorsky District of Kaliningrad Oblast
- Kutuzovo, Moscow, a village under the administrative jurisdiction of Zelenograd, Moscow
- Kutuzovo, Moscow Oblast, a village under the administrative jurisdiction of Domodedovo City Under Oblast Jurisdiction, Moscow Oblast
- Kutuzovo, Nizhny Novgorod Oblast, a village in Veryakushsky Selsoviet of Diveyevsky District of Nizhny Novgorod Oblast
- Kutuzovo, Oryol Oblast, a village in Timiryazevsky Selsoviet of Kolpnyansky District of Oryol Oblast
- Kutuzovo, Pskov Oblast, a village in Pskovsky District of Pskov Oblast
- Kutuzovo, Kalyazinsky District, Tver Oblast, a village in Kalyazinsky District, Tver Oblast
- Kutuzovo, Spirovsky District, Tver Oblast, a village in Spirovsky District, Tver Oblast
