= Maltsevo =

Maltsevo (Russian: Мальцево) is the name of several rural localities in Russia:

- Maltsevo, Kaliningrad Oblast, a village in Voskresenskoye Rural Settlement of Ozyorsky District in Kaliningrad Oblast
- Maltsevo, Vologda Oblast, a village in Voskresenskoye Rural Settlement of Cherepovetsky District in Vologda Oblast
