= Sibirskoye, Kaliningrad Oblast =

Settlement in Kaliningrad Oblast

Sibirskoye Сибирское
- Rural locality
- Interactive map of Sibirskoye
- Location of Sibirskoye Sibirskoye (European Russia) Sibirskoye (Russia)
- Coordinates: 54°51′12″N 20°58′42″E
- Country: Russia
- Federal subject: Kaliningrad Oblast
- Administrative district: Polessky District

Population
  - Estimate (2010): 43 )
- Time zone: UTC+2 (MSK–1)
- Postal code: 238651
- OKTMO ID: 27718000406

Sibirskoye (Russian: Сибирское; Lithuanian: Moryčiai) is a rural locality in Polessky District of Kaliningrad Oblast, Russia. It has a population of 43 (2010 census);

== History ==
The Trzczacki Polish noble family lived in the village in the past. In 1856, the village had a population of 191.
