= Lyublino, Kaliningrad Oblast =

Lyublino Люблино
- Rural locality
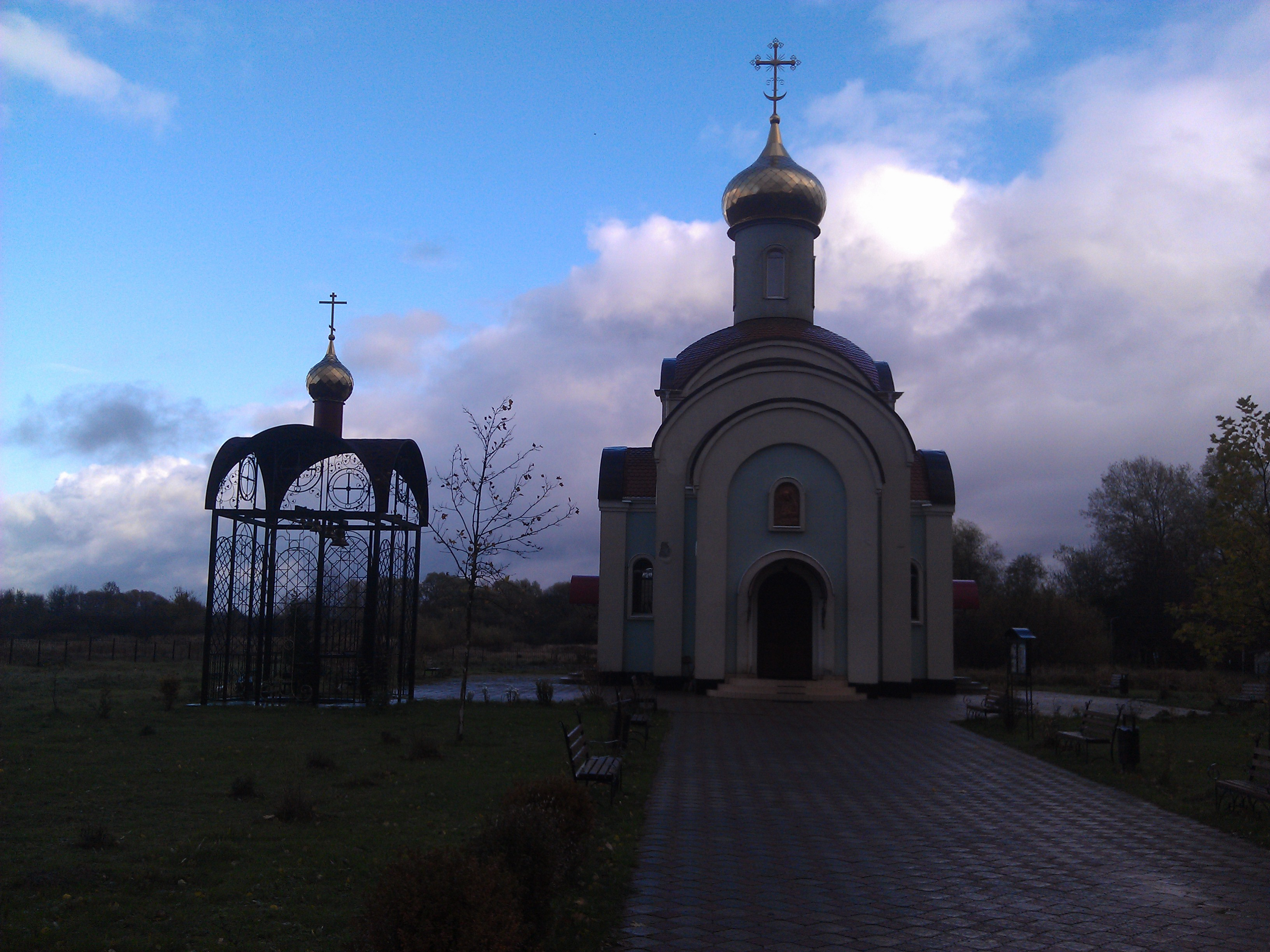
- Saint Xenia Church
- Interactive map of Lyublino
- Location of Lyublino Lyublino (European Russia) Lyublino (Russia)
- Coordinates: 54.7494°N 20.2906°E
- Country: Russia
- Federal subject: Kaliningrad Oblast
- Administrative district: Svetly
- Founded: 1400

Population (2010 Census)
  - Total: 1,606
  - Estimate (2010): 1,606 (0%)
- Time zone: UTC+2 (MSK–1)
- Postal code: 238347
- OKTMO ID: 27725000136

Lyublino (Russian: Лю́блино; German: Seerappen; Polish: Zaropy; Lithuanian: Serupėnai, Serapai) is a settlement under jurisdiction of the town of Svetly in Kaliningrad Oblast, Russia.

== History ==
The settlement was founded in 1400. In 1454, the region was incorporated by King Casimir IV Jagiellon to the Kingdom of Poland upon the request of the anti-Teutonic Prussian Confederation. After the subsequent Thirteen Years' War (1454–1466), the Teutonic Order regained authority over the settlement as a fief of the Polish Crown. From 1525 it was held by Ducal Prussia. From the 18th century it was part of the Kingdom of Prussia, and from 1871 to 1945 it was also part of Germany, within which it was administratively located in the Kreis Fischhausen (district) in the province of East Prussia. It was known for being the site of an airship base, and then a Luftwaffe airbase. During World War II, from September 1944 to January 1945, the airbase was the location of a subcamp of the Stutthof concentration camp, in which Nazi Germans imprisoned around 1,100 Jewish women and 100 Jewish men as forced labour. Following the war, the settlement passed to the Soviet Union.

== See also ==
- List of inhabited localities in Kaliningrad Oblast
