= Nemansky =

Nemansky (masculine), Nemanskaya (feminine), or Nemanskoye (neuter) may refer to:

- Nemansky District, a district of Kaliningrad Oblast, Russia
- Nemanskoye Urban Settlement, a municipal formation, which the town of district significance of Neman in Nemansky District of Kaliningrad Oblast, Russia, is incorporated as
- Nemanskoye (rural locality), a rural locality (a settlement) in Krasnoznamensky District of Kaliningrad Oblast, Russia

== See also ==
- Neman (disambiguation)
