= Kalinino, Kaliningrad Oblast =

Settlement in Kaliningrad Oblast

Kalinino Калинино
- Rural locality
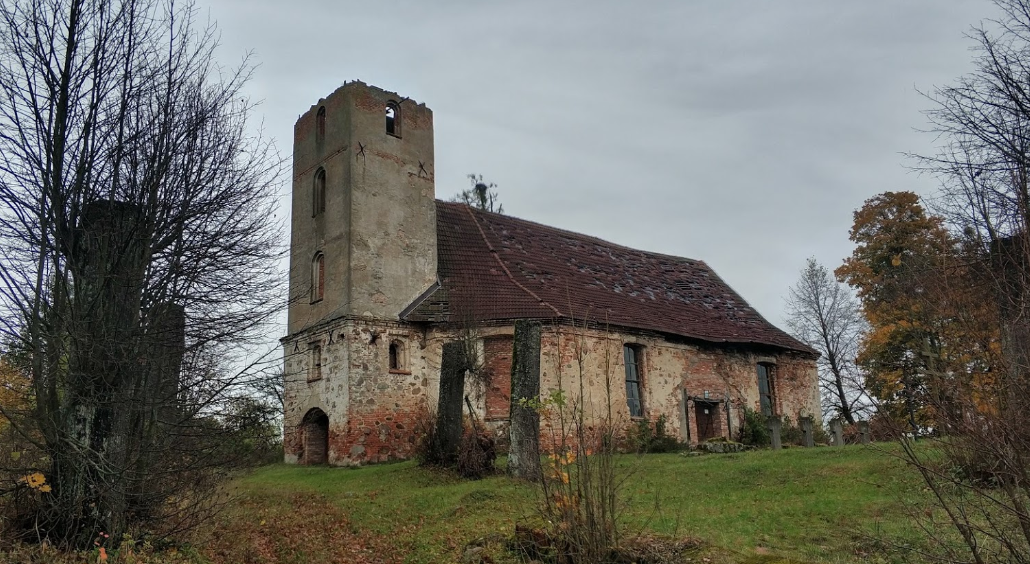
- Old church ruins
- Interactive map of Kalinino
- Location of Kalinino Kalinino (European Russia) Kalinino (Russia)
- Coordinates: 54°26′50″N 22°34′30″E
- Country: Russia
- Federal subject: Kaliningrad Oblast
- Administrative district: Nesterovsky District
- First mentioned: 1539
- Elevation: 150 m (490 ft)

Population
  - Estimate (2010): 499 )
- Time zone: UTC+2 (MSK–1)
- Postal code: 238024
- OKTMO ID: 27624406141

Kalinino (Russian: Кали́нино; Polish: Melkiejmy; Lithuanian: Mielkiemis; German: Mehlkehmen (until 1938), Birkenmühle (1938-1945)) is a rural locality in Nesterovsky District of Kaliningrad Oblast, Russia, close to the borders with Lithuania and Poland. It has a population of 499 (2010 census);

== History ==
The village was first mentioned in 1539. The Metalski Polish noble family lived in the village in the past. In 1877, the village had a population of 689, mostly employed in farming and cattle and horse breeding.

Under Nazi Germany, the village was renamed Birkenmühle in 1938 to erase traces of Lithuanian origin.
