= Uzlovoy =

Uzlovoy (Russian: Узловой; masculine), Uzlovaya (Узловая; feminine), or Uzlovoye (Узловое; neuter) is the name of several inhabited localities in Russia.

Urban localities

- Uzlovaya, a town in Uzlovsky District of Tula Oblast; administratively incorporated as a town under district jurisdiction

Rural localities

- Uzlovoy, Krasnodar Krai, a settlement in Bagovsky Rural Okrug of Mostovsky District of Krasnodar Krai
- Uzlovoy, Orenburg Oblast, a settlement in Karavanny Selsoviet of Orenburgsky District of Orenburg Oblast
- Uzlovoye, Guryevsky District, a settlement in Khrabrovsky Rural Okrug of Guryevsky District of Kaliningrad Oblast
- Uzlovoye, Krasnoznamensky District, a settlement in Vesnovsky Rural Okrug of Krasnoznamensky District of Kaliningrad Oblast
