= Zavodskoye, Kaliningrad Oblast =

Settlement in Kaliningrad Oblast

Zavodskoye Заводское
- Rural locality
- Interactive map of Zavodskoye
- Location of Zavodskoye Zavodskoye (European Russia) Zavodskoye (Russia)
- Coordinates: 54°42′10″N 22°31′10″E
- Country: Russia
- Federal subject: Kaliningrad Oblast
- Administrative district: Nesterovsky District

Population
  - Estimate (2021): 21 )
- Time zone: UTC+2 (MSK–1)
- Postal code: 238014
- OKTMO ID: 27624402121

Zavodskoye (Russian: Заводское, Lithuanian: Žvyrgaliai) is a rural settlement in Nesterovsky District of Kaliningrad Oblast, Russia. It is located in the region of Lithuania Minor.

== Demographics ==
Distribution of the population by ethnicity according to the 2021 census:

	percent
Russians	76.19%
Lithuanians	23.81%
