= Telmanovo, Chernyakhovsky District =

Settlement in Kaliningrad Oblast

Telmanovo Тельманово
- Rural locality
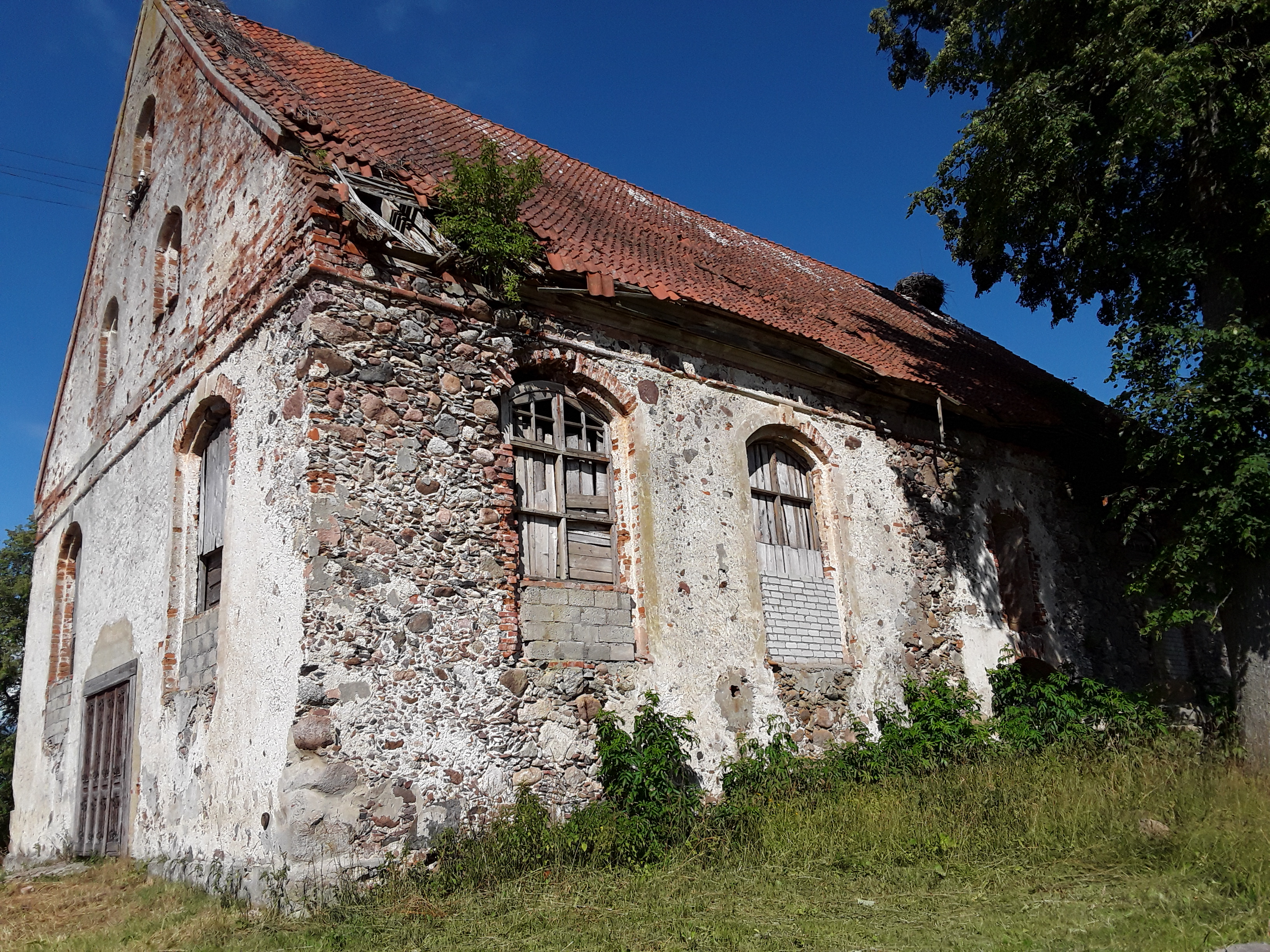
- Didlacken church in disrepair.
- Interactive map of Telmanovo
- Location of Telmanovo Telmanovo (European Russia) Telmanovo (Russia)
- Coordinates: 54°34′40″N 21°45′20″E
- Country: Russia
- Federal subject: Kaliningrad Oblast

Population
  - Estimate (2021): 153 )
- Time zone: UTC+2 (MSK–1)
- Postal code: 238162
- OKTMO ID: 27739000551

Telmanovo (Russian: Тельманово, Lithuanian: Didlaukiai, German: Didlacken) is a rural settlement in Chernyakhovsky District of Kaliningrad Oblast, Russia. It is located in the historic region of Lithuania Minor.

== History ==
In the 17th century, the settlement became a possession of French immigrant and mercenary officer Pierre de la Cave. The local church(de) was founded in 1665. Lithuanian and German-language church services were held at the church.

During World War II, the German Nazi government operated a forced labour subcamp of the Stalag I-A prisoner-of-war camp in the village.

== Demographics ==
Distribution of the population by ethnicity according to the 2021 census:

	percent
Russians	64.05%
Yazidis	10.46%
Belarusians	0.65%
Kazakhs	0.65%
refused answer or no data	24.18%
