= Privolnoye, Chernyakhovsky District =

Settlement in Kaliningrad Oblast

Privolnoye Привольное
- Rural locality
- Interactive map of Privolnoye
- Location of Privolnoye Privolnoye (European Russia) Privolnoye (Russia)
- Coordinates: 54°43′29″N 21°54′24″E
- Country: Russia
- Federal subject: Kaliningrad Oblast
- Administrative district: Chernyakhovsky District
- Founded: 1578

Population
  - Estimate (2021): 542 )
- Time zone: UTC+2 (MSK–1)
- Postal code: 238171
- OKTMO ID: 27739000451

Privolnoye (Russian: Привольное, Lithuanian: Naniškas, Polish: Neumiszki) is a rural settlement in Chernyakhovsky District of Kaliningrad Oblast, Russia. It is located in the historic region of Lithuania Minor, approximately 13 kilometres (8 mi) north-east of Chernyakhovsk.

== History ==
The village was first recorded in 1578. The majority of Lithuanian inhabitants died to the Great Northern War plague outbreak in 1709. From 1711, Calvinist immigrants from Switzerland, Nassau and the Palatinate settled in the village. A new school and Reformed church were built in 1748 and 1808, respectively. The local Reformed congregation was gifted silverware by the Polish Reformed Congregation of Königsberg (Polish: Królewiec) as it dissolved in 1843. As of 1878, the village had a population of 370, Calvinist by confession, employed in agriculture and cattle and horse breeding. In 1938, the Nazi government of Germany renamed the village to Neunassau in attempt to erase traces of Lithuanian origin.

== Demographics ==
Distribution of the population by ethnicity according to the 2021 census:

	percent
Russians	80.07%
Armenians	12.36%
Lithuanians	1.66%
Ukrainians	1.11%
Chechens	1.11%
Germans	0.92%
Dargins	0.55%
