= Gremyachye, Kaliningrad Oblast =

Settlement in Kaliningrad Oblast

Gremyachye Гремячье
- Rural locality
- Interactive map of Gremyachye
- Location of Gremyachye Gremyachye (European Russia) Gremyachye (Russia)
- Coordinates: 54°42′0″N 21°40′15″E
- Country: Russia
- Federal subject: Kaliningrad Oblast
- Administrative district: Chernyakhovsky District

Population
  - Estimate (2021): 258 )
- Time zone: UTC+2 (MSK–1)
- Postal code: 238170
- OKTMO ID: 27739000166

Gremyachye (Russian: Гремячье, Polish: Berżkale; Lithuanian: Beržkalnis) is a rural settlement in Chernyakhovsky District of Kaliningrad Oblast, Russia. It is located in the historic region of Lithuania Minor.

== Demographics ==
Distribution of the population by ethnicity according to the 2021 census:

	percent
Yazidi	61.24%
Russians	36.05%
Lithuanians	1.94%
