= Chernyakhovsky =

Chernyakhovsky (masculine), Chernyakhovskaya (feminine), or Chernyakhovskoye (neuter) may refer to:

- Ivan Chernyakhovsky (1906–1945), Soviet General of the Army
- Chernyakhovsky District, a district of Kaliningrad Oblast, Russia
- Chernyakhovskoye Urban Settlement, a municipal formation which the town of district significance of Chernyakhovsk in Chernyakhovsky District of Kaliningrad Oblast, Russia is incorporated as
- 24968 Chernyakhovsky, an asteroid

== See also ==
- Chernyakhovsk
- Chernyakhov culture
