= Nekrasovo, Polessky District =

Settlement in Kaliningrad Oblast

Nekrasovo Некрасово
- Rural locality
- Interactive map of Nekrasovo
- Location of Nekrasovo Nekrasovo (European Russia) Nekrasovo (Russia)
- Coordinates: 54°49′N 21°2′E
- Country: Russia
- Federal subject: Kaliningrad Oblast
- Founded: c. 1332

Population (2010 Census)
  - Total: 133
  - Estimate (2010): 133 (0%)
- Time zone: UTC+2 (MSK–1)
- Postal code: 238651
- OKTMO ID: 27718000371

Nekrasovo (Russian: Некрасово; Lithuanian: Šarlaukis) is a rural locality in Polessky District of Kaliningrad Oblast, Russia. It has a population of 133 (2010 census).

== History ==
The village was founded around 1332. The Uklański Polish noble family lived in the village.
