= Zagorskoye, Chernyakhovsky District =

Settlement in Kaliningrad Oblast

Zagorskoye Загорское
- Rural locality
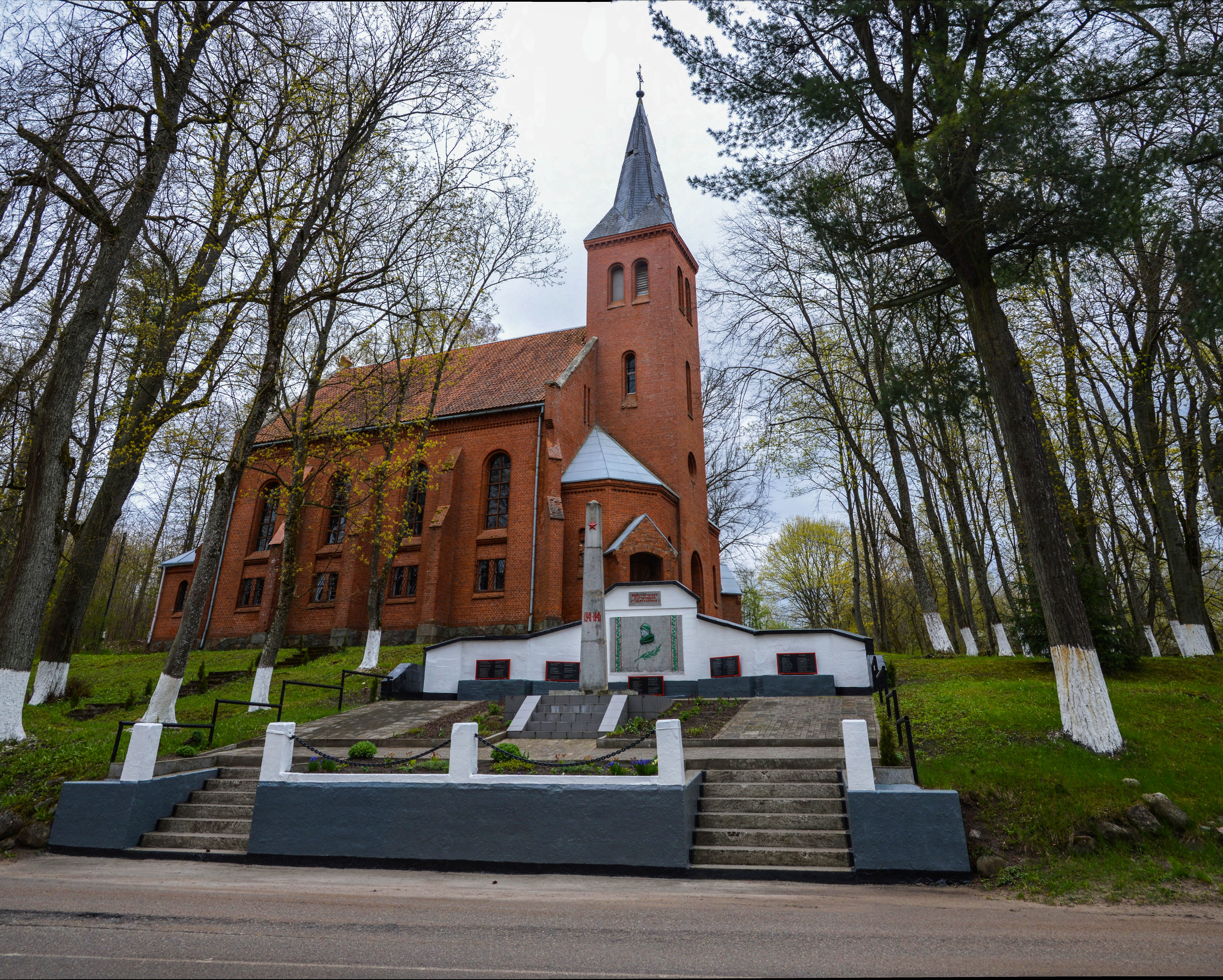
- Church
- Interactive map of Zagorskoye
- Location of Zagorskoye Zagorskoye (European Russia) Zagorskoye (Russia)
- Coordinates: 54°44′30″N 21°57′54″E
- Country: Russia
- Federal subject: Kaliningrad Oblast
- Administrative district: Chernyakhovsky District
- Founded: 1539
- Elevation: 40 m (130 ft)

Population
  - Estimate (2010): 516 )
- Time zone: UTC+2 (MSK–1)
- Postal code: 238172
- OKTMO ID: 27739000206

Zagorskoye (Russian: Загорское; Polish: Peleninki; Lithuanian: Peleninkai) is a rural locality in Chernyakhovsky District of Kaliningrad Oblast, Russia. It is located in the region of Lithuania Minor. It has a population of 516 (2010 census); 681 (2002 census);

== History ==
The village was founded in 1539. In the late 19th century, the village had a population of 410, partially Polish by ethnicity, mostly employed in farming and cattle and horse breeding. Cattle and horses were sold at markets in Gierdawy and Welawa.

Under Nazi Germany, the village was renamed Strigengrund to erase traces of non-German origin.
