= Volodarovka, Kaliningrad Oblast =

Settlement in Kaliningrad Oblast

Volodarovka Володаровка
- Rural locality
- Interactive map of Volodarovka
- Location of Volodarovka Volodarovka (European Russia) Volodarovka (Russia)
- Coordinates: 54°30′10″N 21°41′10″E
- Country: Russia
- Federal subject: Kaliningrad Oblast
- Administrative district: Chernyakhovsky District

Population
  - Estimate (2021): 286 )
- Time zone: UTC+2 (MSK–1)
- Postal code: 238103
- OKTMO ID: 27739000146

Volodarovka (Russian: Володаровка, Lithuanian: Juodlaukiai) is a rural settlement in Chernyakhovsky District of Kaliningrad Oblast, Russia. It is located in the historic region of Lithuania Minor.

== History ==
The local church was founded in 1718. Lithuanian and German-language church services were held at the church.

== Demographics ==
Distribution of the population by ethnicity according to the 2021 census:

	percent
Russians	72.38%
Talysh	7.69%
Yazidis	5.94%
Germans	5.59%
Belarusians	3.15%
Lithuanians	1.75%
Azeris	1.75%
