= Derzhavino, Kaliningrad Oblast =

Settlement in Kaliningrad Oblast

Derzhavino Державино
- Rural locality
- Interactive map of Derzhavino
- Location of Derzhavino Derzhavino (European Russia) Derzhavino (Russia)
- Coordinates: 54°38′50″N 21°36′30″E
- Country: Russia
- Federal subject: Kaliningrad Oblast
- Administrative district: Chernyakhovsky District

Population
  - Estimate (2021): 126 )
- Time zone: UTC+2 (MSK–1)
- Postal code: 238176
- OKTMO ID: 27739000176

Derzhavino (Russian: Державино, Lithuanian: Didieji Lašininkai) is a rural settlement in Chernyakhovsky District of Kaliningrad Oblast, Russia. It is located in the historic region of Lithuania Minor.

== Demographics ==
Distribution of the population by ethnicity according to the 2021 census:

	percent
Russians	69.05%
Yazidis	26.19%
Armenians	3.97%
