= Zelyonoye, Nesterovsky District =

Settlement in Kaliningrad Oblast

Zelyonoye Зелёное
- Rural locality
- Interactive map of Zelyonoye
- Location of Zelyonoye Zelyonoye (European Russia) Zelyonoye (Russia)
- Coordinates: 54°37′10″N 22°25′10″E
- Country: Russia
- Federal subject: Kaliningrad Oblast
- Administrative district: Nesterovsky District

Population
  - Estimate (2021): 15 )
- Time zone: UTC+2 (MSK–1)
- Postal code: 238010
- OKTMO ID: 27624402126

Zelyonoye (Russian: Зелёное, Lithuanian: Lenkišiai, German: Grünhaus) is a rural settlement in Nesterovsky District of Kaliningrad Oblast, Russia. It is located in the region of Lithuania Minor.

== Demographics ==
Distribution of the population by ethnicity according to the 2021 census:

| | percent |
| Russians | 80.00% |
| Poles | 13.33% |
| Lithuanians | 6.67% |
