= Tokarevka, Kaliningrad Oblast =

Tokarevka Токаревка
- Rural locality
- Interactive map of Tokarevka
- Location of Tokarevka Tokarevka (European Russia) Tokarevka (Russia)
- Coordinates: 54°25′10″N 22°24′10″E
- Country: Russia
- Federal subject: Kaliningrad Oblast

Population
  - Estimate (2010): 10 )
- Time zone: UTC+2 (MSK–1)
- Postal code: 238022
- OKTMO ID: 27624406186

Tokarevka (Russian: Токаревка; Polish: Makuniszki; Lithuanian: Makūniškiai) is a rural settlement in Nesterovsky District of Kaliningrad Oblast, Russia.
