= Yagodnoye, Nesterovsky District =

Settlement in Kaliningrad Oblast

Yagodnoye Ягодное
- Rural locality
- Interactive map of Yagodnoye
- Location of Yagodnoye Yagodnoye (European Russia) Yagodnoye (Russia)
- Coordinates: 54°28′N 22°38′E
- Country: Russia
- Federal subject: Kaliningrad Oblast
- Administrative district: Nesterovsky District

Population
  - Estimate (2021): 3 )
- Time zone: UTC+2 (MSK–1)
- Postal code: 238025
- OKTMO ID: 27624404186

Yagodnoye (Russian: Ягодное, Lithuanian: Bredūnai) is a rural settlement in Nesterovsky District of Kaliningrad Oblast, Russia, close to the border with Lithuania. It is located in the region of Lithuania Minor.

According to the 2021 census, the population of the village was Lithuanian.
