= Pridorozhnoye, Chernyakhovsky District =

Settlement in Kaliningrad Oblast

Pridorozhnoye Придорожное
- Rural locality
- Interactive map of Pridorozhnoye
- Location of Pridorozhnoye Pridorozhnoye (European Russia) Pridorozhnoye (Russia)
- Coordinates: 54°46′12″N 21°58′12″E
- Country: Russia
- Federal subject: Kaliningrad Oblast
- Administrative district: Chernyakhovsky District

Population
  - Estimate (2021): 103 )
- Time zone: UTC+2 (MSK–1)
- Postal code: 238173
- OKTMO ID: 27739000456

Pridorozhnoye (Russian: Придорожное, Lithuanian: Žaslys) is a rural settlement in Chernyakhovsky District of Kaliningrad Oblast, Russia. It is located in the historic region of Lithuania Minor.

== Demographics ==
Distribution of the population by ethnicity according to the 2021 census:

	percent
Russians	53.40%
Armenians	39.81%
Chechens	6.80%
