= Vavilovo, Kaliningrad Oblast =

Settlement in Kaliningrad Oblast

Vavilovo Вавилово
- Rural locality
- Interactive map of Vavilovo
- Location of Vavilovo Vavilovo (European Russia) Vavilovo (Russia)
- Coordinates: 54°29′N 19°58′E
- Country: Russia
- Federal subject: Kaliningrad Oblast
- First mentioned: 1338

Population
  - Estimate (2010): 16 )
- Time zone: UTC+2 (MSK–1)
- OKTMO ID: 27712000111

Vavilovo (Russian: Вавилово; Lithuanian: Bregdai) is a rural locality in Kaliningrad Oblast, Russia. It has a population of 16 (2010 census);

== History ==
The village was first mentioned in 1388. The Pomian Polish noble family lived in the village.
