= Belkino, Pravdinsky District =

Settlement in Kaliningrad Oblast

Belkino Белкино
- Rural locality
- Interactive map of Belkino
- Location of Belkino Belkino (European Russia) Belkino (Russia)
- Coordinates: 54°25′N 21°38′E
- Country: Russia
- Federal subject: Kaliningrad Oblast
- Administrative district: Pravdinsky District

Population
  - Estimate (2021): 70 )
- Time zone: UTC+2 (MSK–1)
- Postal code: 238414
- OKTMO ID: 27719000556

Belkino (Russian: Белкино; German: Abelischken, 1938–1945 Ilmenhorst; Polish: Abeliszki) is a rural settlement in Pravdinsky District of Kaliningrad Oblast, Russia.

== Demographics ==
Distribution of the population by ethnicity according to the 2021 census:

	percent
Russians	58.57%
Armenians	32.86%
no data	8.57%
