= Novosyolki, Bagrationovsky District =

Settlement in Kaliningrad Oblast

Novosyolki Новосёлки
- Rural locality
- Interactive map of Novosyolki
- Location of Novosyolki Novosyolki (European Russia) Novosyolki (Russia)
- Coordinates: 54°23′07″N 21°15′52″E
- Country: Russia
- Federal subject: Kaliningrad Oblast
- Administrative district: Bagrationovsky District

Population
  - Estimate (2021): 21 )
- Time zone: UTC+2 (MSK–1)
- Postal codes: 238423, 238422
- OKTMO ID: 27703000186

Novosyolki (Russian: Новосёлки; German: Klein Waldeck; Lithuanian: Mažasis Valdekas) is a rural settlement in Bagrationovsky District of Kaliningrad Oblast, Russia, close to the border with Poland.

== Demographics ==
Distribution of the population by ethnicity according to the 2021 census:

	percent
Armenians	61.90%
Russians	23.81%
refused answer	14.29%
