= Bychkovo =

Bychkovo Бычково
- Rural locality
- Interactive map of Bychkovo
- Location of Bychkovo Bychkovo (European Russia) Bychkovo (Russia)
- Coordinates: 54°22′10″N 21°3′10″E
- Country: Russia
- Federal subject: Kaliningrad Oblast

Population
  - Estimate (2010): 1 )
- Time zone: UTC+2 (MSK–1)
- Postal code: 238402
- OKTMO ID: 27719000121

Bychkovo (Russian: Бычково; Polish: Kajdany; Lithuanian: Kaidanas) is a rural settlement in Pravdinsky District of Kaliningrad Oblast, Russia, close to the border with Poland.
