= Krasnoyarskoye, Kaliningrad Oblast =

Krasnoyarskoye Красноярское
- Rural locality
- Interactive map of Krasnoyarskoye
- Location of Krasnoyarskoye Krasnoyarskoye (European Russia) Krasnoyarskoye (Russia)
- Coordinates: 54°31′23″N 21°56′45″E
- Country: Russia
- Federal subject: Kaliningrad Oblast
- Administrative district: Ozyorsky District

Population (2010 Census)
  - Total: 575
  - Estimate (2010): 575 (0%)
- Time zone: UTC+2 (MSK–1)
- Postal code: 238122
- OKTMO ID: 27716000521

Krasnoyarskoye (Russian: Красноя́рское; German: Sodehnen; Polish: Sodeny; Lithuanian: Sodėnai) is a rural locality (a selo) in the Ozyorsky District in the Kaliningrad Oblast, Russia. Population: 575 (2010 census); 608 (2002 census);
