= Svetly, Kaliningrad Oblast =

Town in Kaliningrad Oblast, Russia

Svetly Светлый
- Town
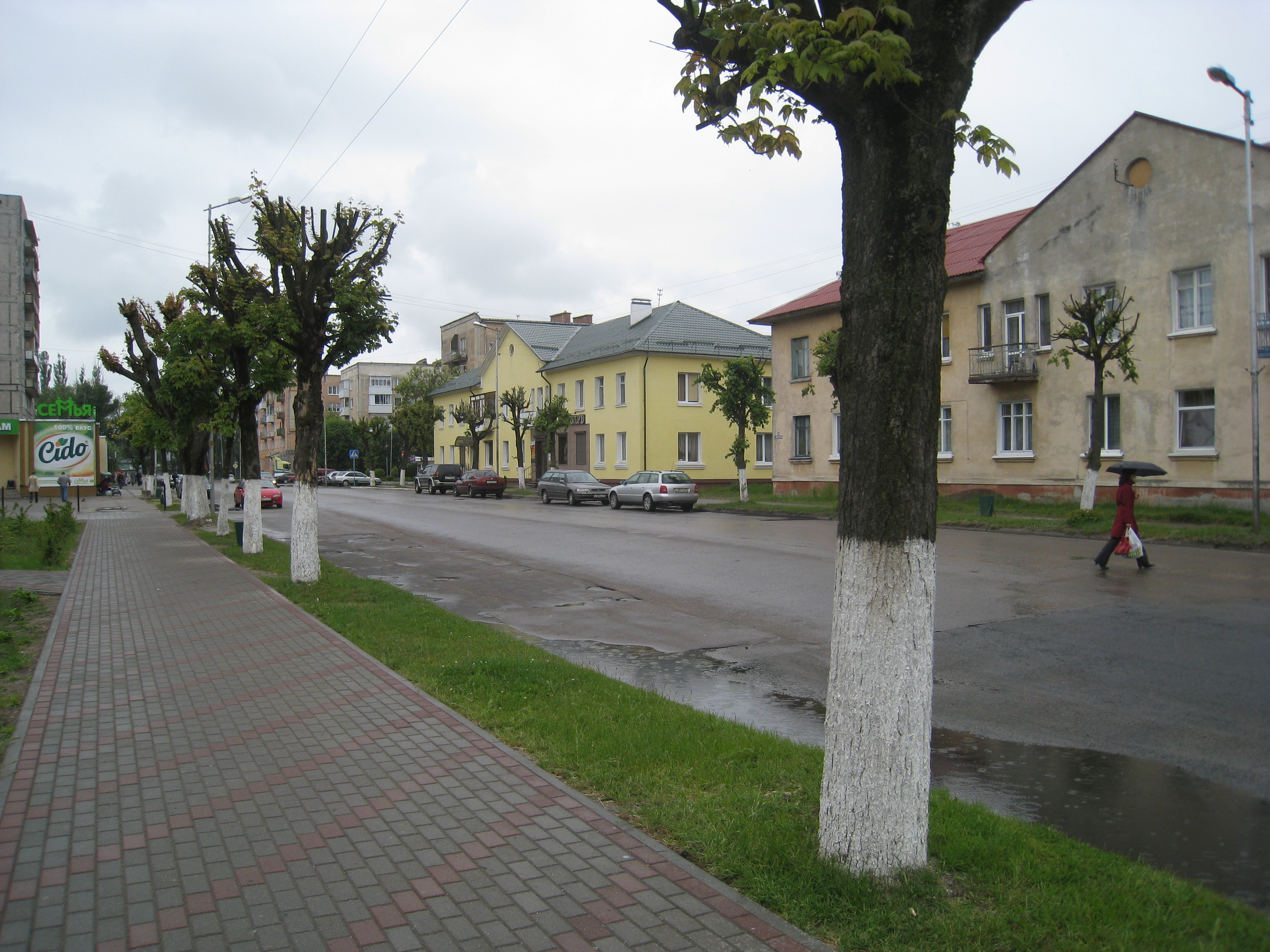
- Soviet Street

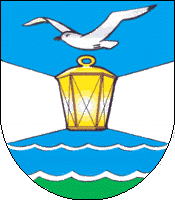
- Coat of arms
- Interactive map of Svetly
- Location of Svetly Svetly (European Russia) Svetly (Europe) Svetly (Russia)
- Coordinates: 54°40′N 20°08′E
- Country: Russia
- Federal subject: Kaliningrad Oblast
- Founded: 1640
- Town status since: 1955
- Elevation: 5 m (16 ft)

Population (2010 Census)
  - Total: 21,375
  - Estimate (2023): 21,054 (−1.5%)

Administrative status
  - Subordinated to: town of oblast significance of Svetly
  - Capital of: town of oblast significance of Svetly

Municipal status
  - Urban okrug: Svetlovsky Urban Okrug
  - Capital of: Svetlovsky Urban Okrug
- Time zone: UTC+2 (MSK–1)
- Postal codes: 238340, 238741
- OKTMO ID: 27725000001
- Website: xn--b1agmh1ai8d.xn--p1ai

Svetly (Russian: Све́тлый; German: Zimmerbude; Lithuanian: Cimerbūdė) is a town in Kaliningrad Oblast, Russia, located on the Sambia Peninsula on the coast of Vistula Lagoon, 30 kilometers (19 mi) west of Kaliningrad. Population: 21,441 (2021 census); 21,375 (2010 census); 21,745 (2002 Census); 19,936 (1989 Soviet census).

== Geography ==
The town is located on the bank of the Kaliningrad sea shipping channel connecting Kaliningrad with the Baltic Sea.

== History ==
The first mention of the predecessor settlement of Zimmerbude dates back to a 15th-century chronicle of the Teutonic Knights. However, even earlier, in a manuscript from Fischhausen of 1305, there is a mention of the peninsula of Payziev ("Poyzart" - the area in the forest Poyz), from which the Teutonic Knights invaded the Old Prussians' territory in the first half of the 13th century. The 15th-century castle, which originally belonged to the bishops of Sambia, has not survived. The modern settlement was founded in 1640. After the confiscation of church property the estate passed to Oswald von Taubenheim, who owned it until 1661.

In 1669, the manor was given to Eberhard von Danckelmann, a former tutor of King Frederick I, as a reward. From the 18th century, the village formed part of the Kingdom of Prussia. Around 1720, the village comprised 16 estates, 12 peasants and about the same number of fishermen whose main occupation was fishing, mainly for their own needs.

After the castle ceased to exist for a long time villagers eked out a miserable existence of subsistence by fishing. Apart from a few acidified meadows they had no land, and therefore almost never held cattle. Their home were extremely cramped and dirty, smoke from the fireplaces escaping through the sagging reed roofs and settling as a thick layer of soot on the kitchen walls. On long winter evenings, kindling was burned in the huts, leaving the residents with permanently black faces. They spun, wove, and sewed their own clothes. To add insult to injury, they suffered from floods, which recurred year after year.

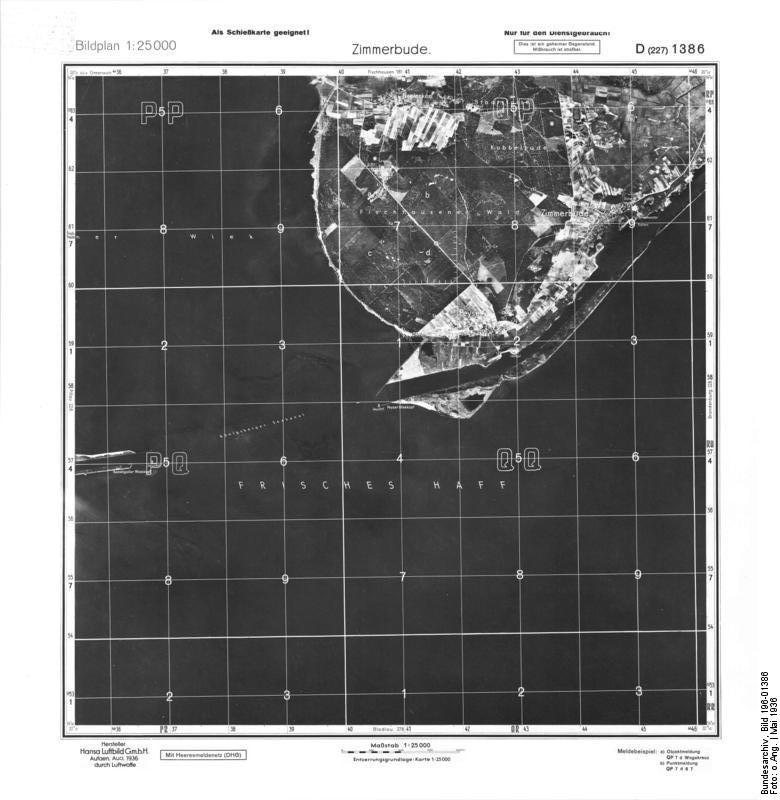
Aerial photo from 1936

Religion played an important role in village life: conducting religious rites, services, etc. For a long time there was no church in the village, so it belonged to the parish church of Medenau. But because of bad roads, the villagers could visit the church in Medenau only a few times during their lives. Baptisms of children and weddings took place there, as well as major feasts when the weather was fine. The rest of the strongly expressed religious feelings of people meet as a church sermons, which were held in the school building. On April 1, 1901, Zimmerbude and the neighboring villages of Peise and Nepleken, with 1,500 residents, formed their own church community and bought the small church that Medenau had built in Zimmerbude two years earlier as its branch.

From 1871, the village also formed part of Germany, within which it was administratively located in the province of East Prussia. In the 1920s, a new school was built and before World War II Zimmerbude was a rather busy, though small village. There was a shop, a restaurant, a bakery, and the inn "Waldschlösschen", which name translates to "Forest castle house". The number of pre-war inhabitants was 742 people.

Historical population
Year	Pop.	±%
1989	19,936	—
2002	21,745	+9.1%
2010	21,375	−1.7%
2021	21,441	+0.3%

During World War II, no military operations took place directly on the territory of the present-day town of Svetly. The war ended for the village in April 1945, leaving no significant destruction, and it passed to the Soviet Union. In 1947 it was renamed Svetly. On June 17, 1947 by the Decree of the Presidium of the Supreme Soviet of the RSFSR a rural council based in Svetly was founded as part of the Primorsky district. It was transformed into a workers settlement by the decision of the Kaliningrad Oblast Executive Committee No 758 of August 1, 1949. On October 6, 1955 by decision of the Presidium of the Supreme Soviet the workers settlement was transformed into a town of regional subordination, which became a centre of the Svetlovsky Urban Okrug in 2008.

== Administrative and municipal status ==
Within the framework of administrative divisions, it is, together with ten rural localities, incorporated as the town of oblast significance of Svetly—an administrative unit with the status equal to that of the districts. As a municipal division, the town of oblast significance of Svetly is incorporated as Svetlovsky Urban Okrug.

== Climate ==
The climate is influenced by the prevailing air mass with Atlantic Ocean to the mainland and is characterized as a transition to the sea with mild winters with little snow, relatively cold spring, moderately warm summers and warm wet autumn. Average annual air temperature - 6.8 °C (44.2 °F). The annual temperature range can reach large sizes - from + 35 °C (95 °F) in July - August to −33 °C (−27 °F) in January - February.

The average temperature in January - −3.4 °C (25.9 °F). There are 86 days per year with frost. Severe frosts are rare. The warmest period - the month of July, when the average temperature is 17.5 °C (63.5 °F). In general, unstable weather patterns and is associated mainly with a predominance of marine air masses with high repeatability accompanying Cyclones (storms).

Moist air masses coming from the Atlantic Ocean, cause high relative humidity, which is winter and fall 85-87 %, decreasing by early summer to 72-73 %. High humidity and a large cloudy significantly affect the features (reduction) of the Svetly regime.

During the year, is celebrated around 150 overcast and only 30 clear days. In an average year recorded 74 days with fogs, mainly fogs in winter. They are accompanied by drizzle, rain and snow. And annual rainfall of up to 700–750 mm (27.6–29.5 in) of rainfall, most of them in the warmer months. The maximum is in the month of August - up to 90 mm (4 in), at least - in February - March. In the winter months falls only 8-10% of annual precipitation. Snow depth is small - 13–18 cm (5–7 in).

The study area generally refers to the area of active wind activity. The wind regime is characterized by a predominance of winds south, western areas with a repeatability of 35%, as well as the southern and south -eastern areas with a repeatability of 23%. The average annual wind speed is 3.7 metres per second (12.1 ft/s). Has the highest rate of wind. In winter, its average speed is 5.5 m/s (18.0 ft/s). The number of days with strong winds (storms) at speeds exceeding 15 m/s (49.2 ft/s) up to 10–15 days.

== Economy ==
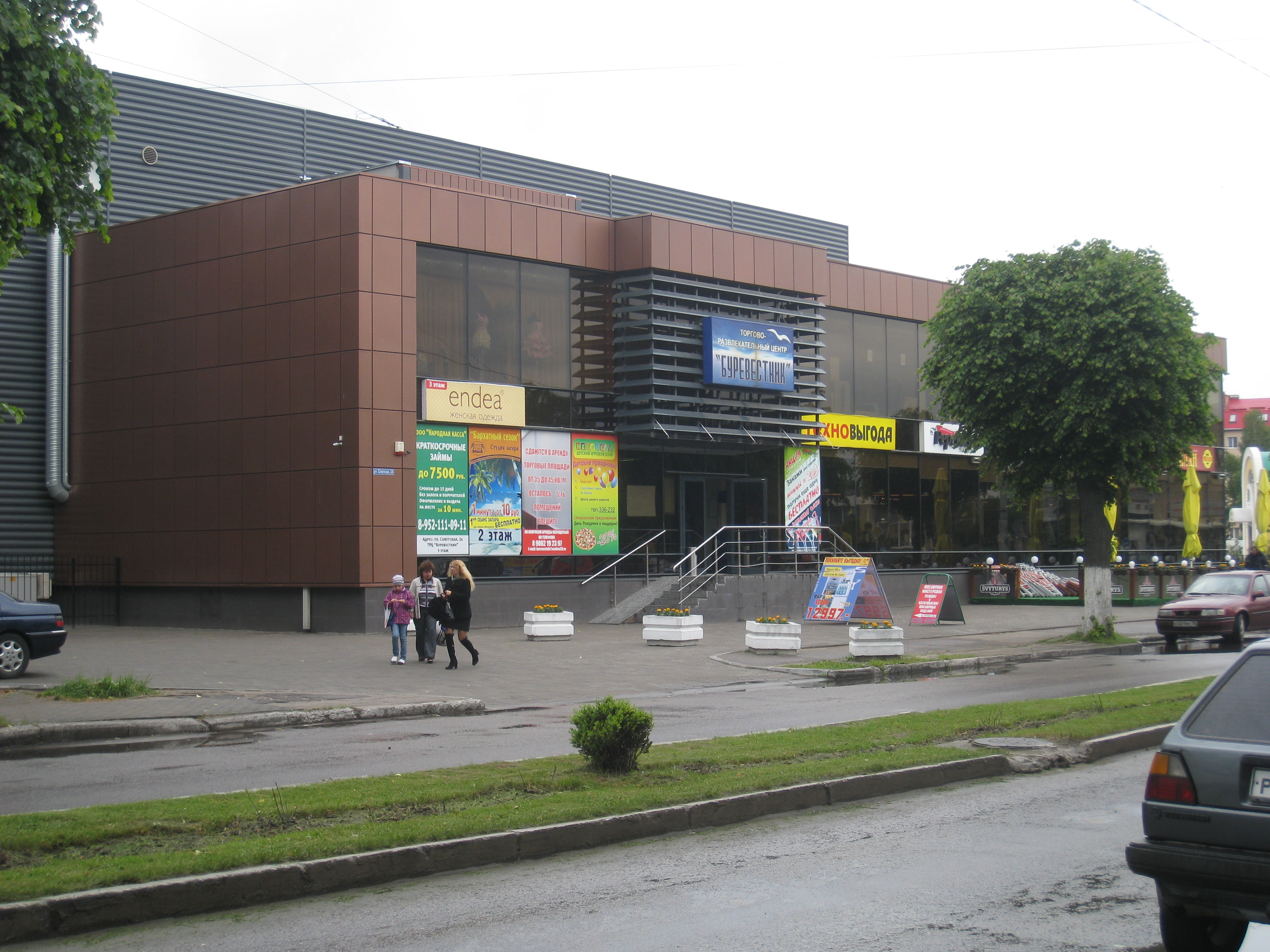
Shopping center

- "Lukoil - Kaliningradmorneft": oil terminal (storage, transfer of liquid petroleum products), steel plant (production of marine steel structures);
- JSC "Sodrujestvo -Soja" - deep processing of oil-bearing crops;
- JSC "Jantarenergo" (GRES - 2) - heat production;
- LLC «Vivo-Porte» - production of interior doors;
- OOO "Optim - Kran" - production gantry and bridge cranes;
- OOO "NPO Speckran" - production gantry and bridge cranes;
- OOO "Regio - Express" - passenger transport;
- Rybkolhoz "Za Rodinu" - fishing and fish processing;
- JSC "Svetly predprijatie "Era" - produces electrical work, repair of electrical equipment, electrical parameter measurements, ship repair river and maritime registers;
- OGUP "Zapremmash" - ship repair and manufacturing, fish processing equipment;
- JSC "Mezhkolhoznaja proizvodstvennaja baza" - ship repair, port services, maintenance and supply of the fishing fleet;
- JSC "Sudoremontnik Baltica" - ship repair, port services;
- JSC "BaltNafta" - handling of oil products;
- OOO "Kreon" - shredding fish canned;

=== Transportation ===
The station is located in svetly Baltic Forest Kaliningrad railway. The station belongs to a dead-end branch branched from the railway line Kaliningrad - Baltiysk. As of 2009 Svetly is not served by passenger trains. Distance to Kaliningrad - 27.5 km (17.1 mi), Khrabrovo Airport - 38 km (24 mi).

== Sights ==
- Church of the Annunciation
- Temple of the Holy Great Martyr Barbara.
- Monument to Lenin.
- Monument to soldiers-internationalists.
- Monument to the liquidators of the Chernobyl accident.
- Church of the Apostles Paul and Gleb.
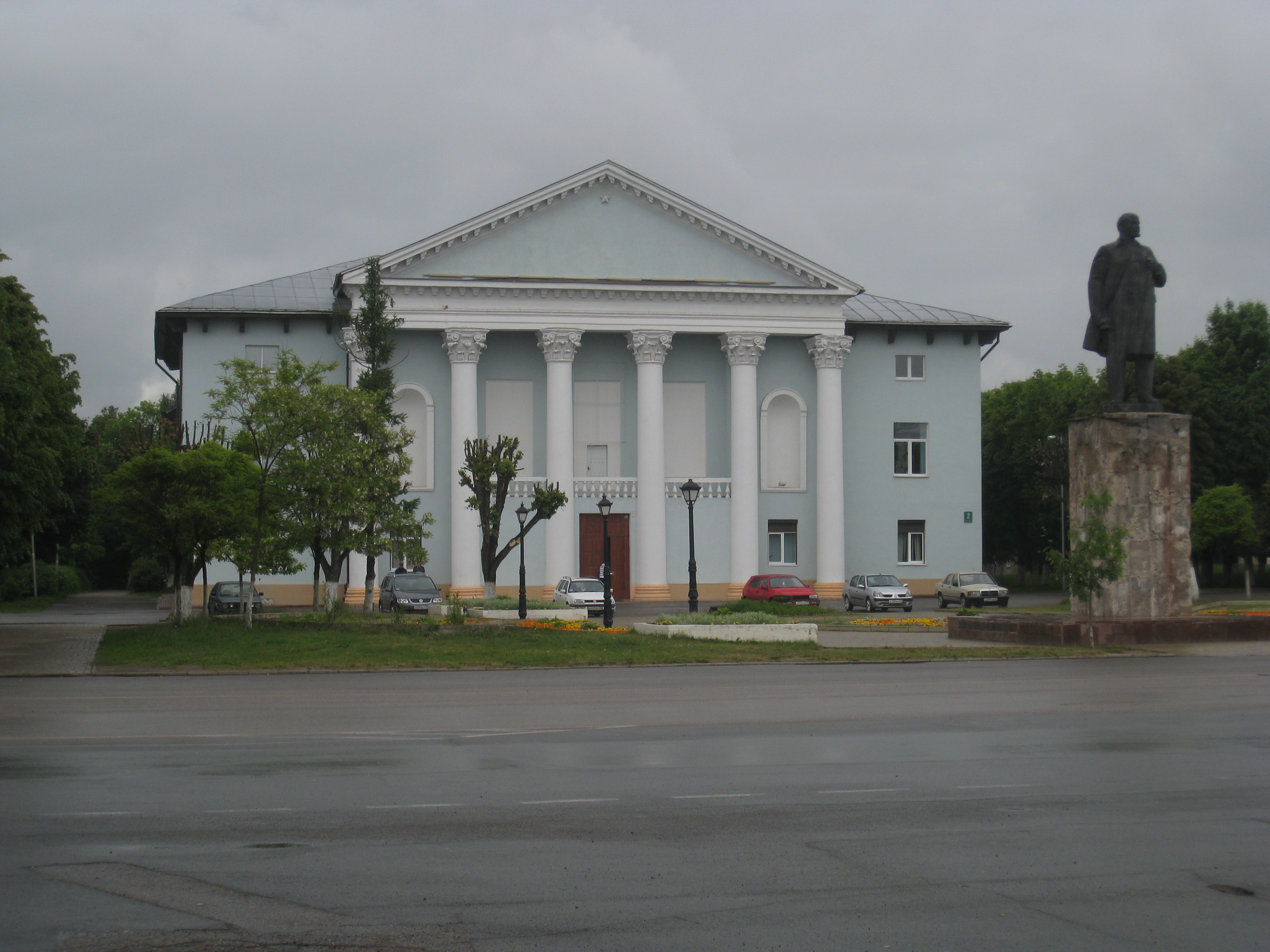
House of Culture and Monument to Lenin

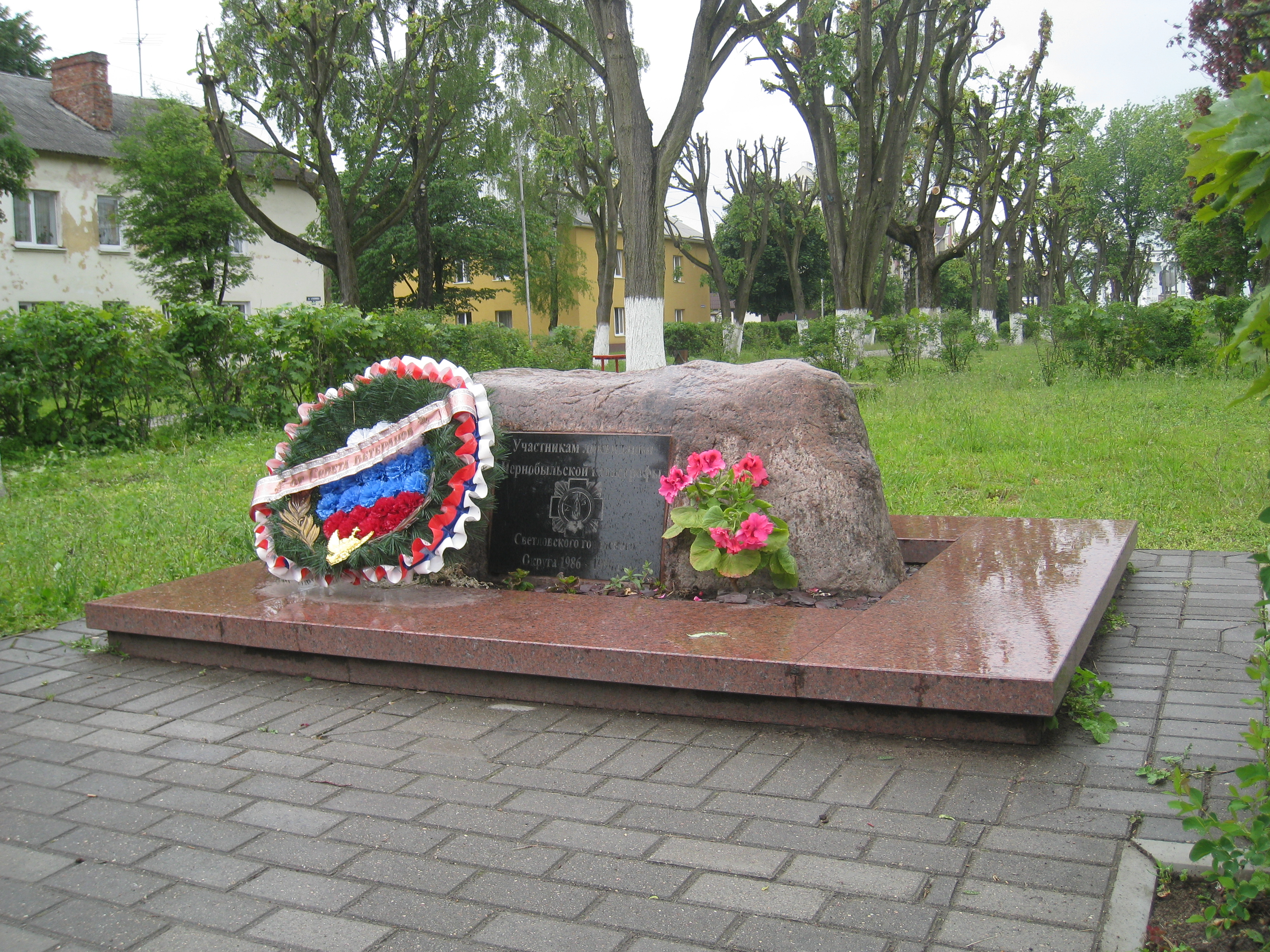
Monument to the liquidators of the Chernobyl accident

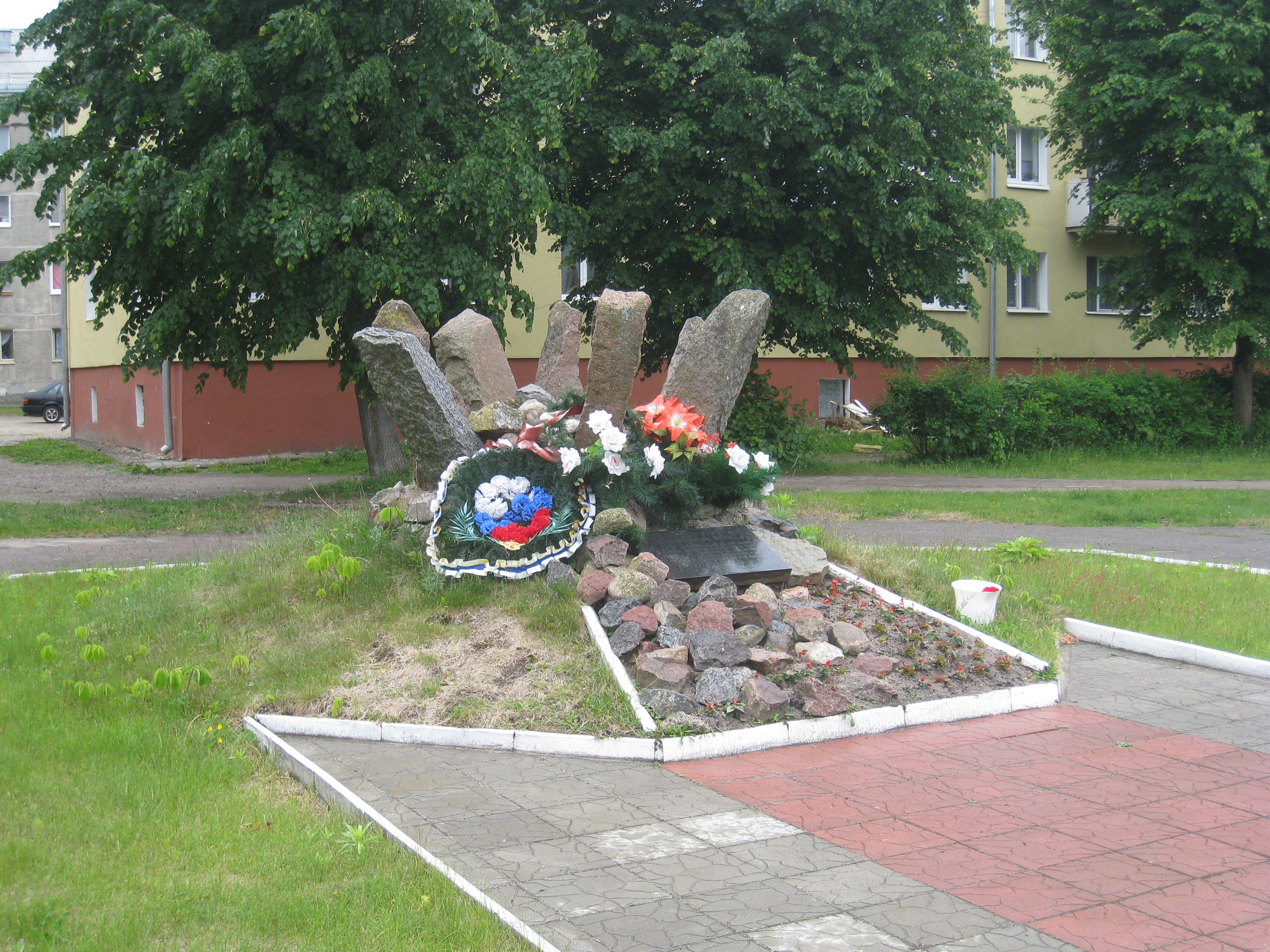
Monument to soldiers-internationalists

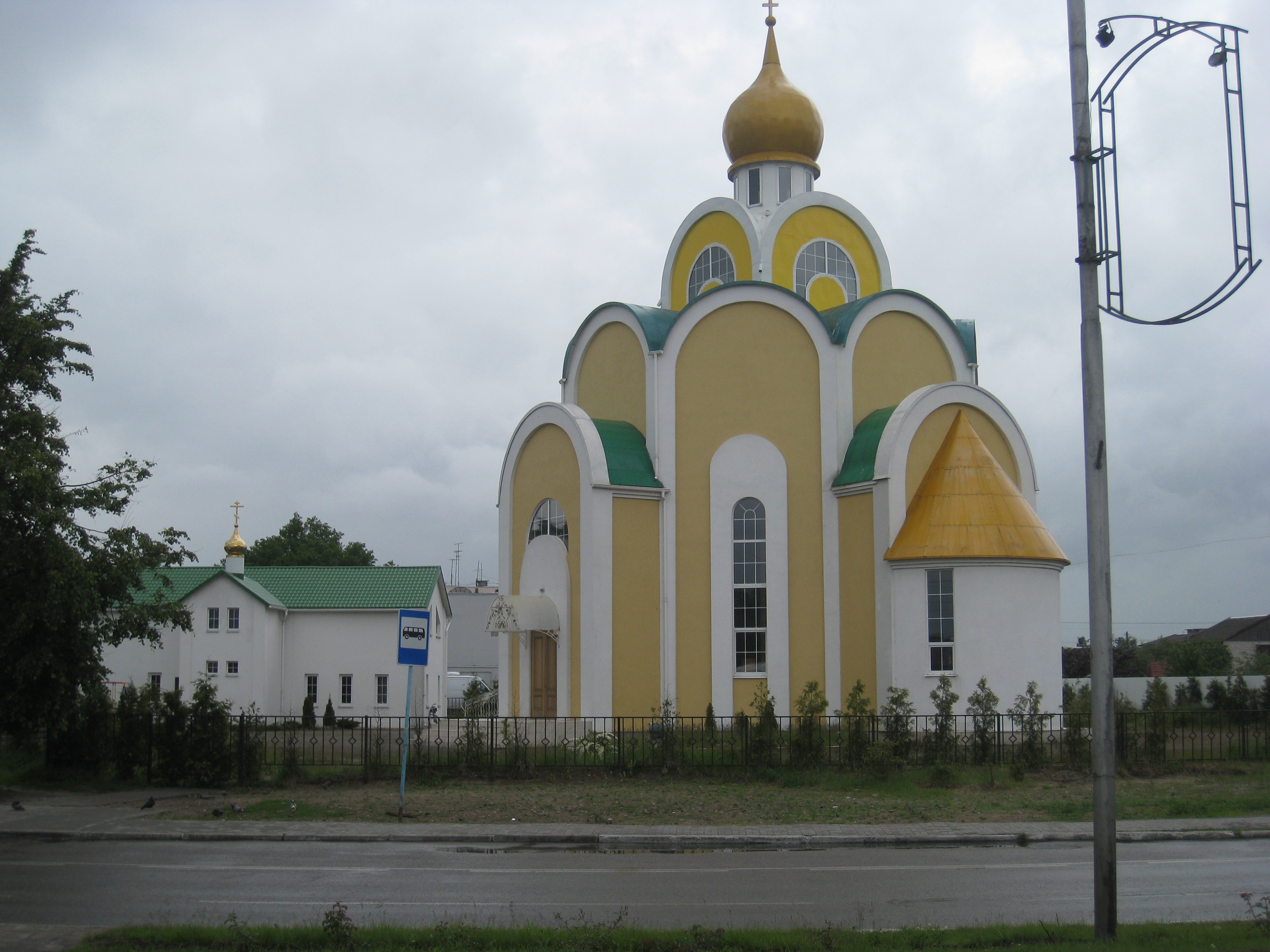
Temple of the Holy Great Martyr Barbara

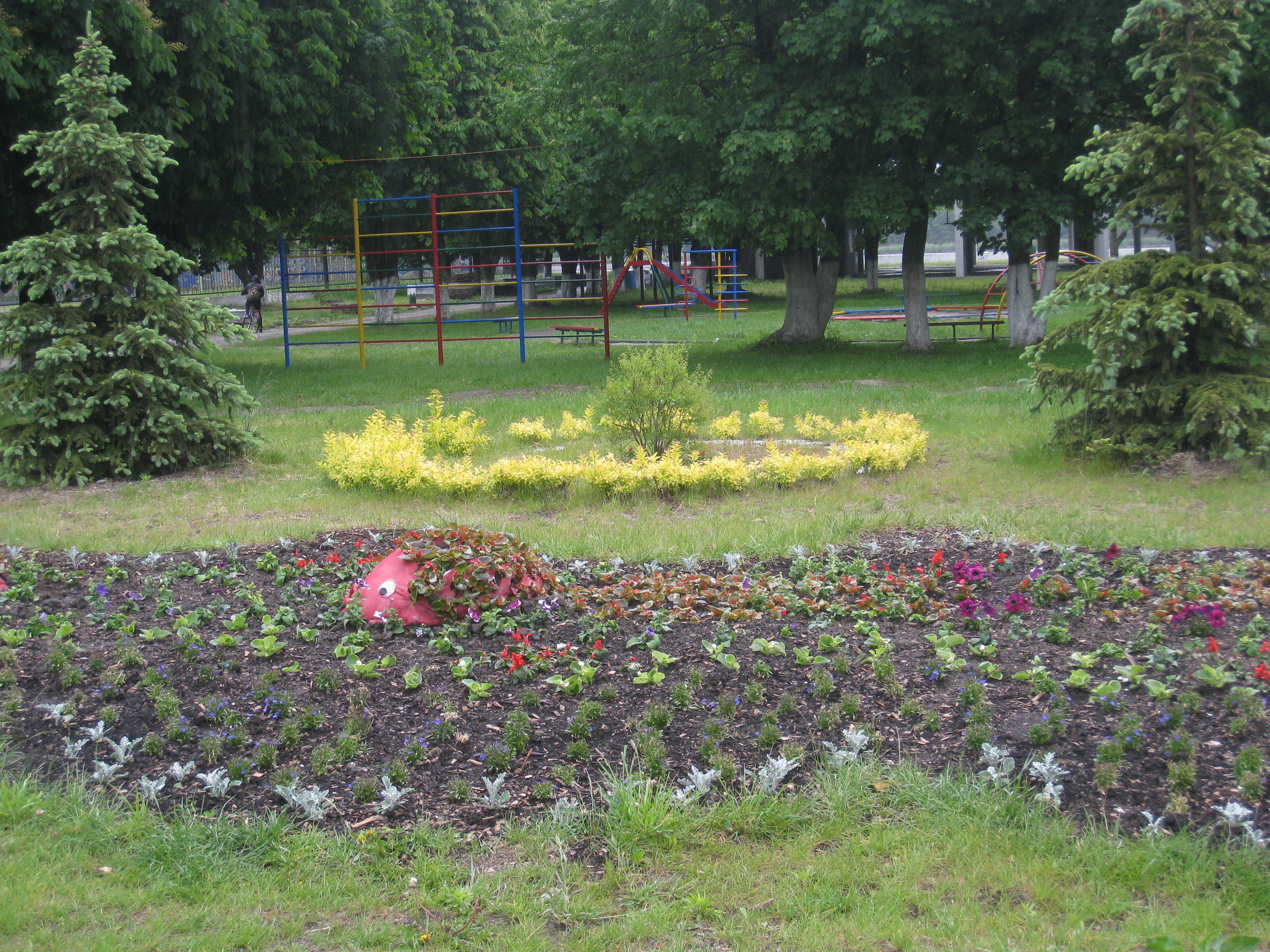
Park

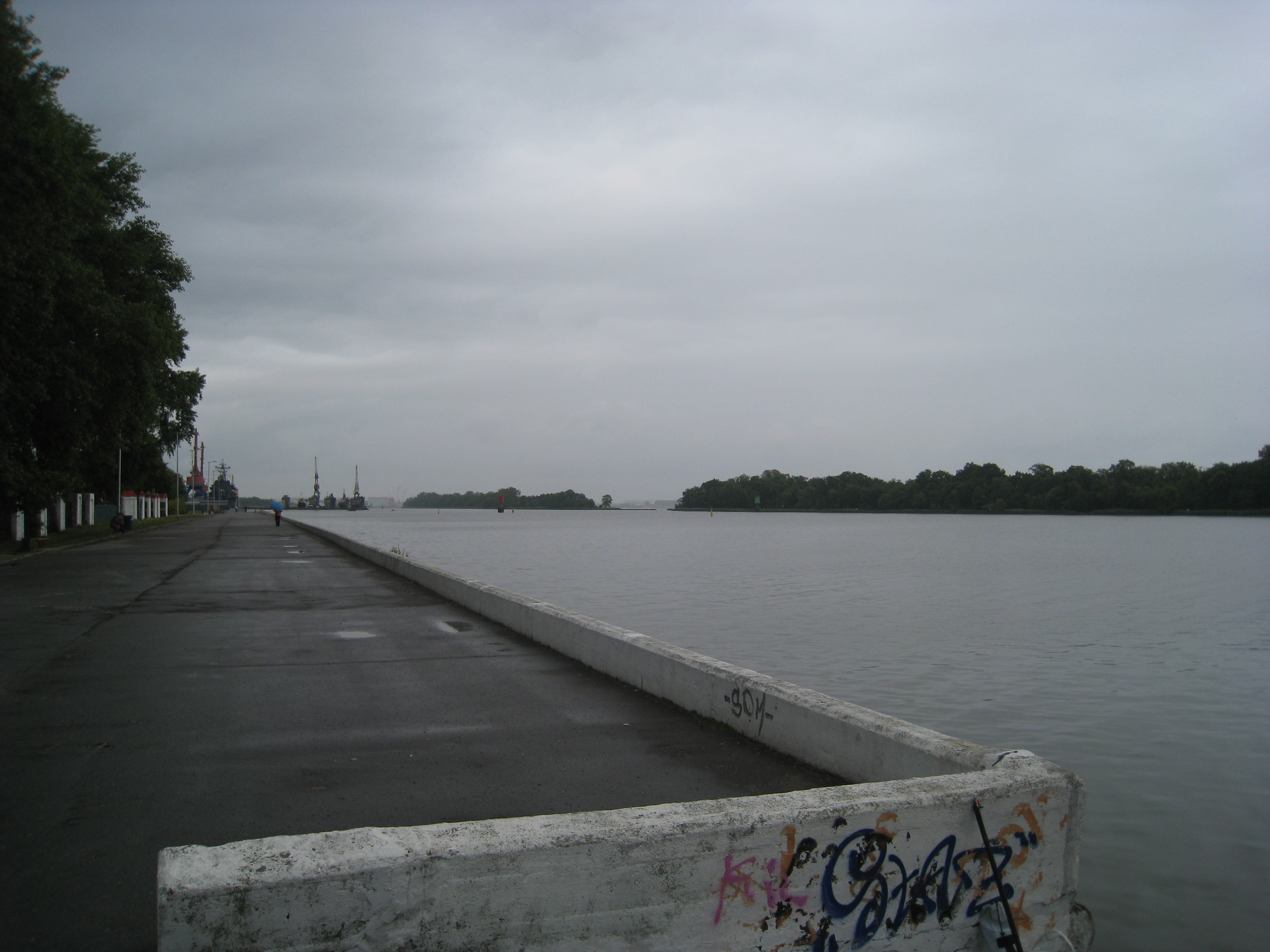
Kaliningrad Sea Canal and the port in Svetly

== Notable people ==
- Eberhard von Danckelmann - Brandenburg statesman.
- Maksim Matveyev - Russian film and theater actor.
- Evans, Edgar Yanisovich - master of sports of international class rowing sports.
- Dmitri Rozinkevich - Honored Master of Sports of Russia.
- Bokhonov, Victor F. - Soviet and Russian actor of theater, film and dubbing.

== Twin towns and sister cities ==
Svetly is twinned with:

- Kętrzyn, Poland
- Nowy Dwór Gdański, Poland
- Lida, Belarus
- Karlshamn, Sweden

=== Former twin towns ===
- Świnoujście, Poland (terminated by Świnoujście city authorities as a response to the 2022 Russian invasion of Ukraine)
- Malbork, Poland (terminated by Malbork due to the 2022 Russian invasion of Ukraine)
