= Novoye, Kaliningrad Oblast =

Abandoned settlement in Kaliningrad Oblast

Novoye Новое
- Rural locality
- Interactive map of Novoye
- Location of Novoye Novoye (European Russia) Novoye (Russia)
- Coordinates: 54°29′31″N 21°10′32″E
- Country: Russia
- Federal subject: Kaliningrad Oblast

Population (2010 Census)
  - Total: 0
  - Estimate (2010): 0 )
- Time zone: UTC+2 (MSK–1)
- Postal code: 238405
- OKTMO ID: 27719000186

Novoye (Russian: Новое; Lithuanian: Tremavas) is an abandoned rural locality in Pravdinsky District of Kaliningrad Oblast, Russia. It has a population of 0 (2010 census).

The Załuski and Hordziewicz Polish noble families lived in the village.
