= Smirnovo, Kaliningrad Oblast =

Smirnovo Смирново
- Rural locality
- Interactive map of Smirnovo
- Location of Smirnovo Smirnovo (European Russia) Smirnovo (Russia)
- Coordinates: 54°25′10″N 22°19′10″E
- Country: Russia
- Federal subject: Kaliningrad Oblast
- Administrative district: Ozyorsky District
- Elevation: 105 m (344 ft)

Population
  - Estimate (2010): 51 )
- Time zone: UTC+2 (MSK–1)
- Postal code: 238125
- OKTMO ID: 27716000236

Smirnovo (Russian: Смирново, Polish: Skórno) is a rural settlement in Ozyorsky District of Kaliningrad Oblast, Russia, close to the border with Poland.

== History ==
There is a hill near the village, which was a tribal stronghold in pagan times.

In the late 19th century, the village had a population of 368, partly Polish, and entirely Lutheran. There were two paper mills in the village, and a post office from which mail was going towards Ełk, Gołdap and Gumbinnen.
