= Nekrasovo, Ozyorsky District =

Settlement in Kaliningrad Oblast

Nekrasovo Некрасово
- Rural locality
- Interactive map of Nekrasovo
- Location of Nekrasovo Nekrasovo (European Russia) Nekrasovo (Russia)
- Coordinates: 54°23′12″N 21°42′20″E
- Country: Russia
- Federal subject: Kaliningrad Oblast

Population
  - Estimate (2010): 76 )
- Time zone: UTC+2 (MSK–1)
- Postal code: 238132
- OKTMO ID: 27716000336

Nekrasovo (Russian: Некрасово; Polish: Karpowo Wielkie; Lithuanian: Didžioji Karpava) is a rural locality in Ozyorsky District of Kaliningrad Oblast, Russia, near the border with Poland. It has a population of 76 (2010 census);

The village was founded by Polish people as Karpowo.
