= Sadovo, Russia =

Sadovo Садово
- Rural locality
- Interactive map of Sadovo
- Location of Sadovo Sadovo (European Russia) Sadovo (Russia)
- Coordinates: 54°57′N 22°19′E
- Country: Russia
- Federal subject: Kaliningrad Oblast
- Administrative district: Krasnoznamensky District
- First mentioned: 1628

Population (2010 Census)
  - Total: 288
  - Estimate (2010): 288 (0%)
- Time zone: UTC+2 (MSK–1)
- Postal code: 238745
- OKTMO ID: 27713000211

Sadovo (Russian: Садово, German: Groß Kackschen, 1938-45 Birkenhain (Ostpr.), Lithuanian: Didieji Kakšiai) is a village in the Krasnoznamensky District, Kaliningrad Oblast, Russia. It is located in the historical region of Lithuania Minor.

== History ==
The oldest known mention of the village comes from 1628, when it was part of Ducal Prussia, a vassal duchy of the Kingdom of Poland. From the 18th century it formed part of the Kingdom of Prussia, from 1871 it was also part of Germany, within which it was administratively located in the province of East Prussia. After Germany's defeat in World War II, it passed to the Soviet Union.

== Demographics ==
According to the 2021 census, the village had a population of 271, 77.5% Russian, 12.6% Armenian and 7.8% Lithuanian.
