= Kulikovo, Zelenogradsky District =

Settlement in Kaliningrad Oblast

Kulikovo Куликово
- Rural locality
- Interactive map of Kulikovo
- Location of Kulikovo Kulikovo (European Russia) Kulikovo (Russia)
- Coordinates: 54°55′41″N 20°19′32″E
- Country: Russia
- Federal subject: Kaliningrad Oblast

Population
  - Estimate (2010): 267 )
- Time zone: UTC+2 (MSK–1)
- Postal code: 238542
- OKTMO ID: 27710000236

Kulikovo (Russian: Кулико́во, Lithuanian: Strobėnai, German: Strobjehnen) is a rural settlement in Zelenogradsky District of Kaliningrad Oblast, Russia. It is located in Sambia.

== History ==
During the German invasion of Poland, which started World War II in September 1939, the youngest schoolchildren of the Polish gymnasium in Kwidzyn were imprisoned in the village by the Nazis. The children were held in a dirty wooden barrack, and slept on straw.
