= Roshchino, Guryevsky District =

Settlement in Kaliningrad Oblast

Roshchino Рощино
- Rural locality
- Interactive map of Roshchino
- Location of Roshchino Roshchino (European Russia) Roshchino (Russia)
- Coordinates: 54°38′40″N 20°36′50″E
- Country: Russia
- Federal subject: Kaliningrad Oblast

Population
  - Estimate (2010): 189 )
- Time zone: UTC+2 (MSK–1)
- Postal codes: 238355, 238325
- OKTMO ID: 27707000391

Roshchino (Russian: Рощино, Lithuanian: Dalkiemis) is a rural settlement in Guryevsky District of Kaliningrad Oblast, Russia. It is located in Natangia. It has a population of 189 (2010 census);

== Demographics ==
Distribution of the population by ethnicity according to the 2021 census:

	percent
Russians	50.15%
Armenians	0.61%
refused answer or no data	45.59%
