= Malinniki, Kaliningrad Oblast =

Settlement in Kaliningrad Oblast

Malinniki Малинники
- Rural locality
- Interactive map of Malinniki
- Location of Malinniki Malinniki (European Russia) Malinniki (Russia)
- Coordinates: 54°43′10″N 20°44′50″E
- Country: Russia
- Federal subject: Kaliningrad Oblast
- Administrative district: Guryevsky District

Population
  - Estimate (2010): 290 )
- Time zone: UTC+2 (MSK–1)
- Postal code: 238313
- OKTMO ID: 27707000456

Malinniki (Russian: Малинники; Lithuanian: Špicingas) is a rural locality in Guryevsky District of Kaliningrad Oblast, Russia. It has a population of 290 (2010 census);

The Polish Kowalski noble family lived in the village in the past.
