= Donskoye, Ozyorsky District, Kaliningrad Oblast =

Donskoye Донско́е
- Rural locality
- Interactive map of Donskoye
- Location of Donskoye Donskoye (European Russia) Donskoye (Russia)
- Coordinates: 54°27′12″N 21°44′41″E
- Country: Russia
- Federal subject: Kaliningrad Oblast
- Administrative district: Ozyorsky District

Population
  - Estimate (2021): 22 )
- Time zone: UTC+2 (MSK–1)
- Postal code: 238133
- OKTMO ID: 27716000411

Donskoye (Russian: Донско́е; German: Elkinehlen; Polish: Elkinele; Lithuanian: Elkinėliai) is a rural locality (a selo) in the Ozyorsky District in the Kaliningrad Oblast, Russia. Population: 27 (2010 census);

== Demographics ==
Distribution of the population by ethnicity according to the 2021 census:

	percent
Russians	59.09%
Lithuanians	36.36%
Ukrainians	4.55%
