= Vasilevskoye =

Settlement in Kaliningrad Oblast

Vasilevskoye Васильевское
- Rural locality
- Interactive map of Vasilevskoye
- Location of Vasilevskoye Vasilevskoye (European Russia) Vasilevskoye (Russia)
- Coordinates: 54°54′56″N 20°42′38″E
- Country: Russia
- Federal subject: Kaliningrad Oblast

Population
  - Estimate (2021): 64 )
- Time zone: UTC+2 (MSK–1)
- Postal code: 238316
- OKTMO ID: 27707000651

Vasilevskoye (Russian: Васильевское, Lithuanian: Veselhefenas) is a rural settlement in Guryevsky District of Kaliningrad Oblast, Russia. It is located in the historic region of Sambia.

According to the 2021 census, the village had a population of 64, 64.06% Yazidi, 21.88% Russian, 12.50% Tatar and 1.56% Azeri.
