= Kochkino, Kaliningrad Oblast =

Settlement in Kaliningrad Oblast

Kochkino Кочкино
- Rural locality
- Interactive map of Kochkino
- Location of Kochkino Kochkino (European Russia) Kochkino (Russia)
- Coordinates: 54°21′N 21°30′E
- Country: Russia
- Federal subject: Kaliningrad Oblast

Population
  - Estimate (2010): 40 )
- Time zone: UTC+2 (MSK–1)
- Postal code: 238414
- OKTMO ID: 27719000321

Kochkino (Russian: Кочкино, Polish: Popówko) is a rural settlement in Pravdinsky District of Kaliningrad Oblast, Russia, close to the border with Poland. It lies approximately 6 kilometres (4 mi) north-west of Krylovo.

The village, historically known in Polish as Popówko, was founded by Polish people.
