= Pyatidorozhnoye =

Pyatidorozhnoye Пятидоро́жное
- Rural locality
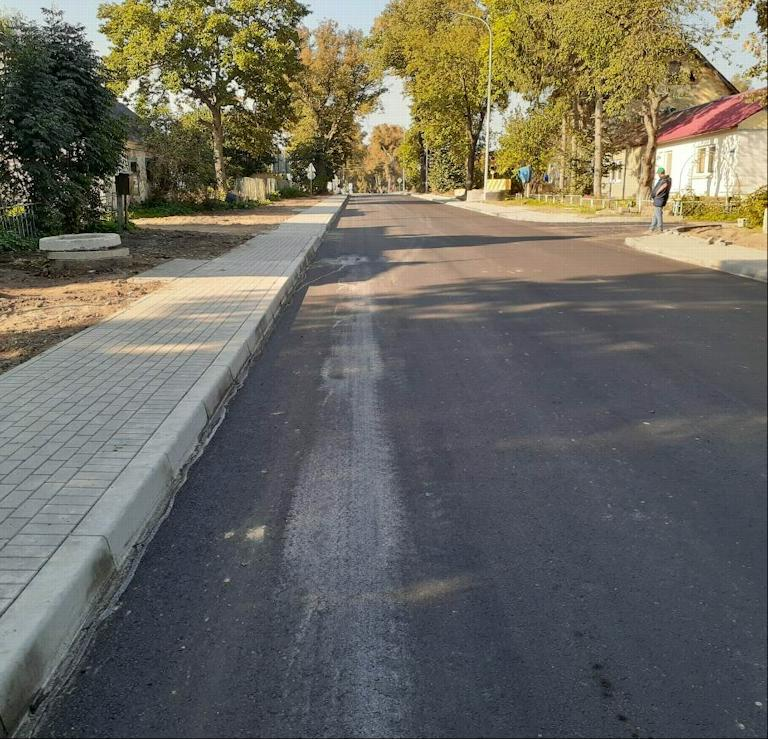
- Interactive map of Pyatidorozhnoye
- Location of Pyatidorozhnoye Pyatidorozhnoye (European Russia) Pyatidorozhnoye (Russia)
- Coordinates: 54°29′58″N 20°5′57″E
- Country: Russia
- Federal subject: Kaliningrad Oblast

Population
  - Estimate (2010): 790 )
- Time zone: UTC+2 (MSK–1)
- Postal code: 238442
- OKTMO ID: 27703000506

Pyatidorozhnoye (Russian: Пятидоро́жное; German: Bladiau; Polish: Bledziewo; Lithuanian: Bladuva) is a rural settlement in Bagrationovsky District of Kaliningrad Oblast, Russia.
