= Malomozhayskoye =

Malomozhayskoye Маломожайское
- Rural locality
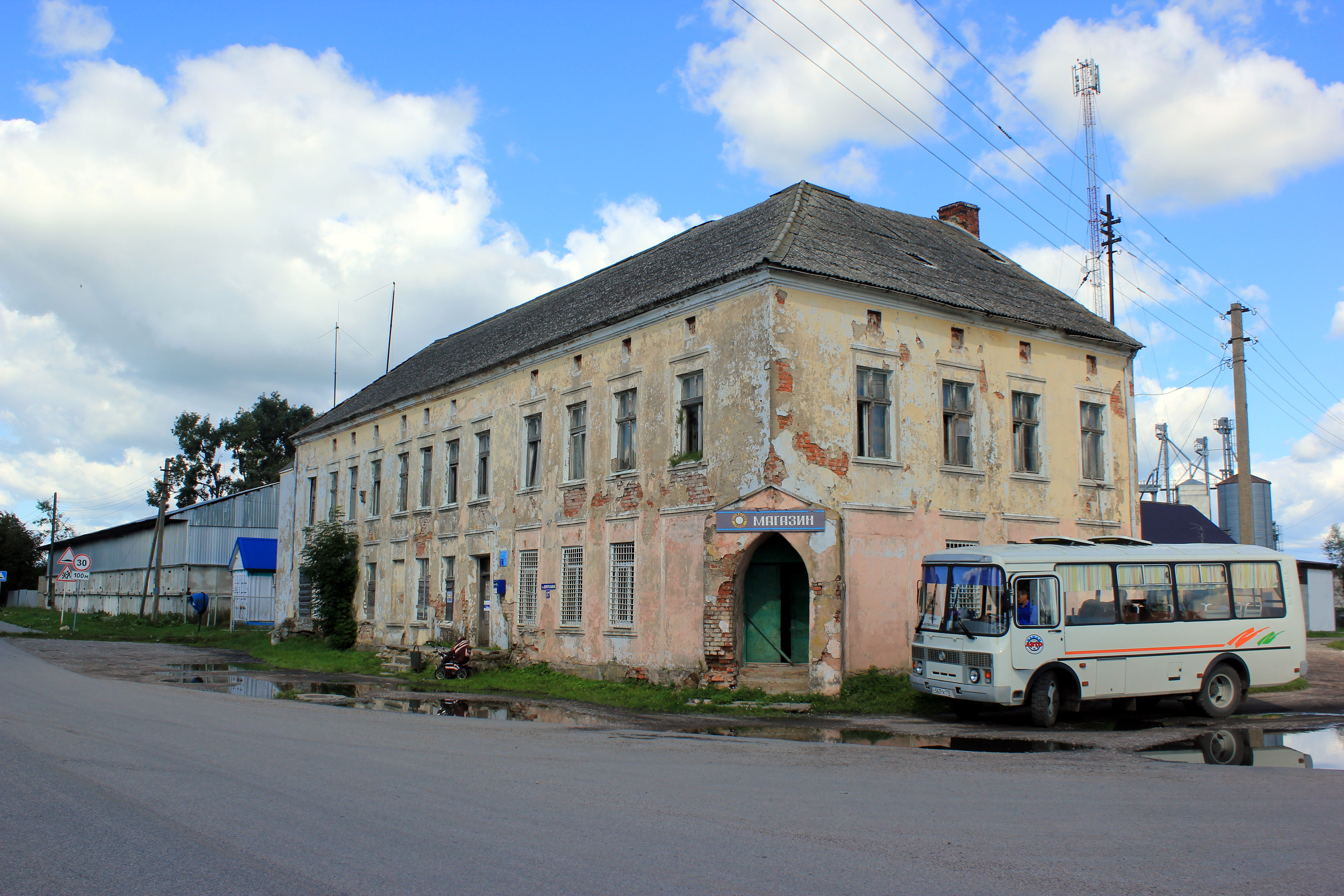
- Interactive map of Malomozhayskoye
- Location of Malomozhayskoye Malomozhayskoye (European Russia) Malomozhayskoye (Russia)
- Coordinates: 54°55′12″N 22°12′0″E
- Country: Russia
- Federal subject: Kaliningrad Oblast
- Administrative district: Nemansky District
- Founded: 1665
- Elevation: 26 m (85 ft)

Population
  - Estimate (2021): 502 )
- Time zone: UTC+2 (MSK–1)
- Postal code: 238717
- OKTMO ID: 27714000271

Malomozhayskoye (Russian: Маломожайское; Polish: Budwiecie; Lithuanian: Būdviečiai) is a rural settlement in Nemansky District of Kaliningrad Oblast, Russia. It is located in the region of Lithuania Minor.

== History ==
The local Protestant parish was consecrated in 1665. Lithuanian-language church services were held here.

Under Nazi Germany, in 1938, the village was renamed Altenkirch to erase traces of Lithuanian origin.

== Demographics ==
Distribution of the population by ethnicity according to the 2021 census:

	percent
Russians	67.93%
Yazidis	12.35%
Lithuanians	6.77%
Armenians	2.99%
Chechens	2.59%
Belarusians	1.20%
Ukrainians	1.00%
Poles	0.60%
Mordvins	0.60%
Refused answer, no nationality or no data	3.39%
