= Lomovo, Kaliningrad Oblast =

Lomovo Ломово
- Rural locality
- Interactive map of Lomovo
- Location of Lomovo Lomovo (European Russia) Lomovo (Russia)
- Coordinates: 54°37′48″N 22°21′7″E
- Country: Russia
- Federal subject: Kaliningrad Oblast

Population
  - Estimate (2010): 190 )
- Time zone: UTC+2 (MSK–1)
- Postal code: 238041
- OKTMO ID: 27709000111

Lomovo (Russian: Ломово; Lithuanian: Pusperiai) is a rural settlement in Gusevsky District of Kaliningrad Oblast, Russia, in the historic region of Lithuania Minor.

The village of Pabbeln, now part of Lomovo, was settled by colonists from Switzerland in 1712, and it contained twelve houses as of 1785.
