= Voloshino, Kaliningrad Oblast =

Settlement in Kaliningrad Oblast

Voloshino Волошино
- Rural locality
- Interactive map of Voloshino
- Location of Voloshino Voloshino (European Russia) Voloshino (Russia)
- Coordinates: 54°48′36″N 21°21′38″E
- Country: Russia
- Federal subject: Kaliningrad Oblast

Population (2010 Census)
  - Total: 13
  - Estimate (2010): 13 (0%)
- Time zone: UTC+2 (MSK–1)
- Postal codes: 238542, 238342
- OKTMO ID: 27710000571

Voloshino (Russian: Волошино; Lithuanian: Brazininkai) is a rural locality in Zelenogradsky District of Kaliningrad Oblast, Russia. It is located in Sambia. It has a population of 13 (2010 census).

The Kręcki Polish noble family lived in the village.
