= Gusevo, Kaliningrad Oblast =

Gusevo Гусево
- Rural locality
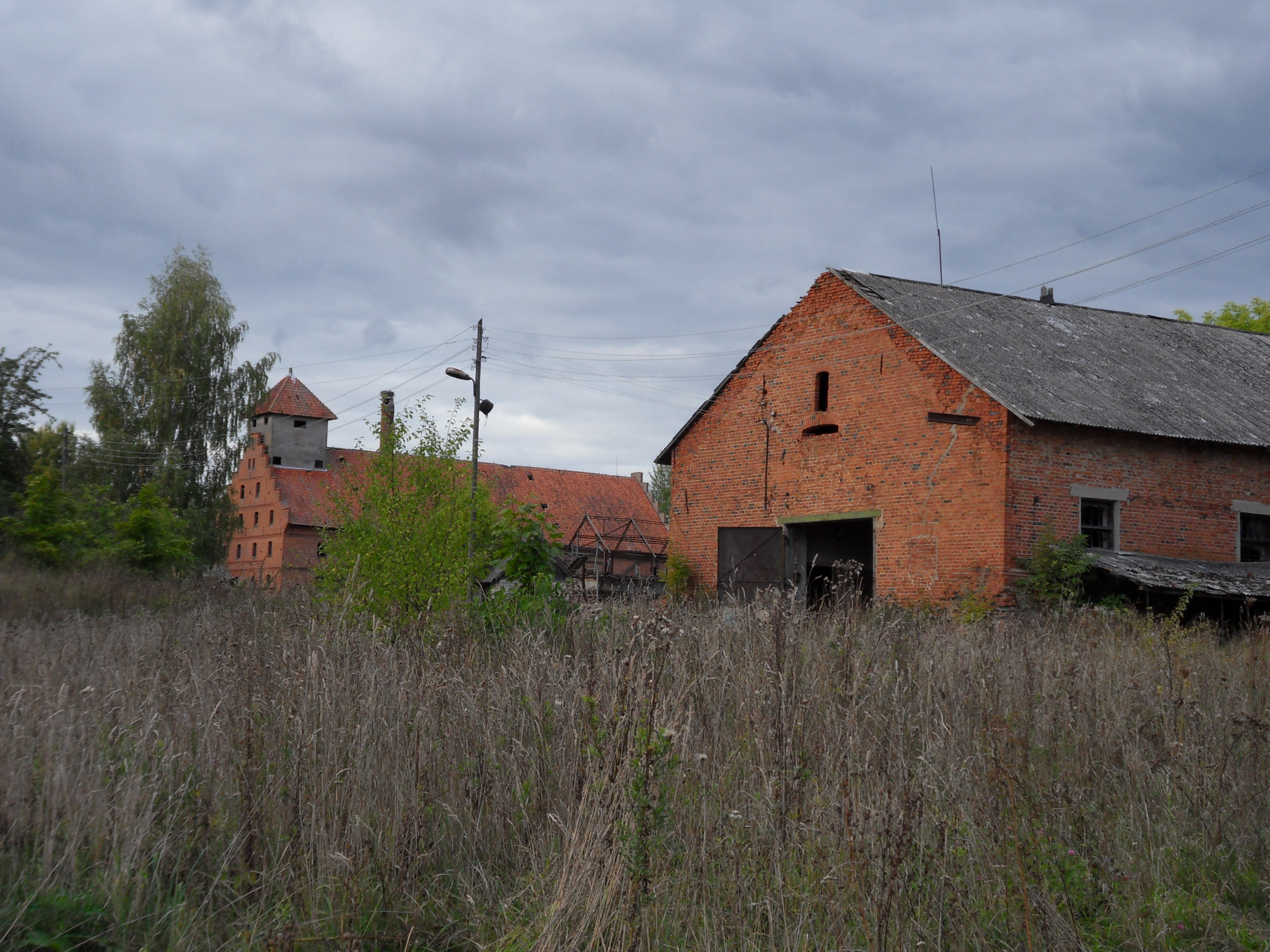
- Old estate farm buildings
- Interactive map of Gusevo
- Location of Gusevo Gusevo (European Russia) Gusevo (Russia)
- Coordinates: 54°27′30″N 21°27′10″E
- Country: Russia
- Federal subject: Kaliningrad Oblast
- Administrative district: Pravdinsky District

Population (2010 Census)
  - Total: 249
  - Estimate (2010): 249 (0%)
- Time zone: UTC+2 (MSK–1)
- Postal code: 238416
- OKTMO ID: 27719000576

Gusevo (Russian: Гу́сево, German: Groß Gnie, Lithuanian: Didieji Ginynai) is a settlement in Pravdinsky District, Kaliningrad Oblast, under the administration of the Mozyrsky Rural Settlement. It had a population of 249 according to the 2010 Census.
