= Novostroyka, Kaliningrad Oblast =

Novostroyka Новостройка
- Rural locality
- Interactive map of Novostroyka
- Location of Novostroyka Novostroyka (European Russia) Novostroyka (Russia)
- Coordinates: 54°32′22″N 22°18′36″E
- Country: Russia
- Federal subject: Kaliningrad Oblast

Population
  - Estimate (2021): 146 )
- Time zone: UTC+2 (MSK–1)
- Postal code: 238031
- OKTMO ID: 27709000116

Novostroyka (Russian: Новостройка) is a rural settlement in Gusevsky District of Kaliningrad Oblast, Russia, in the historic region of Lithuania Minor.

== Demographics ==
Distribution of the population by ethnicity according to the 2021 census:

	percent
Russians	76.03%
Poles	6.85%
Azeris	1.37%
Germans	0.68%
Others or no data	15.07%
