= Karamyshevo, Kaliningrad Oblast =

Karamyshevo Карамышево
- Rural locality
- Interactive map of Karamyshevo
- Location of Karamyshevo Karamyshevo (European Russia) Karamyshevo (Russia)
- Coordinates: 54°25′N 22°14′E
- Country: Russia
- Federal subject: Kaliningrad Oblast

Population
  - Estimate (2021): 367 )
- Time zone: UTC+2 (MSK–1)
- Postal codes: 238147, 238125
- OKTMO ID: 27716000201

Karamyshevo (Russian: Карамышево, Polish: Pobały, Lithuanian: Pėpliai) is a rural settlement in Ozyorsky District of Kaliningrad Oblast, Russia, close to the border with Poland.

Initially following World War II, in 1945, the village passed to Poland as Pobały, however, it was eventually annexed by the Soviet Union and renamed to Karamyshevo.

== Demographics ==
Distribution of the population by ethnicity according to the 2021 census:

	percent
Russians	76.57%
Germans	7.63%
Armenians	6.27%
Poles	3.27%
Belarusians	3.00%
Mordvins	1.09%
Koreans	0.82%
