= Panfilovo, Pravdinsky District =

Panfilovo Панфилово
- Rural locality
- Interactive map of Panfilovo
- Location of Panfilovo Panfilovo (European Russia) Panfilovo (Russia)
- Coordinates: 54°23′N 21°28′E
- Country: Russia
- Federal subject: Kaliningrad Oblast

Population
  - Estimate (2010): 37 )
- Time zone: UTC+2 (MSK–1)
- Postal codes: 238414, 238405
- OKTMO ID: 27719000381

Panfilovo (Russian: Панфилово; Polish: Klonówka; Lithuanian: Klonovka) is a rural settlement in Pravdinsky District of Kaliningrad Oblast, Russia, close to the border with Poland.
