= Central European Summer Time =

Daylight saving time in the Central European time zone

- Time zone

UTC offset
- CEST: UTC+02:00

Current time
- :: CET [refresh] :: CEST [refresh]

Observance of DST
- This time zone is only used for DST. For the rest of the year, CET is used.

Time in Europe: Light Blue / Western European Time / Greenwich Mean Time (UTC); Blue / Western European Time / Greenwich Mean Time (UTC); Blue / Western European Summer Time / British Summer Time / Irish Standard Time (UTC+1); Red / Central European Time (UTC+1); Red / Central European Summer Time (UTC+2); Yellow / Eastern European Time / Kaliningrad Time (UTC+2); Ochre / Eastern European Time (UTC+2); Ochre / Eastern European Summer Time (UTC+3); Green / Moscow Time / Turkey Time (UTC+3); Turquoise / Armenia Time / Azerbaijan Time / Georgia Time / Samara Time (UTC+4); ▉▉▉▉ Pale hues: Standard time observed all year ▉▉▉ Dark hues: Daylight saving time

Central European Summer Time (CEST, UTC+02:00), sometimes referred to as Central European Daylight Time (CEDT), is the standard clock time observed during the period of summer daylight-saving in those European countries which observe Central European Time (CET; UTC+01:00) during the other part of the year. It corresponds to UTC+02:00, which makes it the same as Eastern European Time, Central Africa Time, South African Standard Time, Egypt Standard Time and Kaliningrad Time in Russia.

== Names ==
Other names which have been applied to Central European Summer Time are Middle European Summer Time (MEST), Central European Daylight Saving Time (CEDT), and Bravo Time (after the second letter of the NATO phonetic alphabet).

== Period of observation ==
Since 1996, European Summer Time has been observed between 01:00 UTC (02:00 CET and 03:00 CEST) on the last Sunday of March, and 01:00 UTC on the last Sunday of October; previously the rules were not uniform across the European Union.

There were proposals to abandon summer time in Europe from 2021, possibly by moving winter time up by an hour and keeping that time through the year.

== Usage ==
The following countries and territories regularly use Central European Summer Time:

- Albania, since 1974
- Andorra, since 1985
- Austria, since 1980
- Belgium, since 1980
- Bosnia and Herzegovina, since 1945 when part of Yugoslavia
- Croatia, since 1945 when part of Yugoslavia
- Czech Republic, since 1979 when part of Czechoslovakia
- Denmark (metropolitan), since 1980
- France (metropolitan), since 1976
- Germany, since 1980
- Gibraltar, since 1982
- Hungary, since 1980
- Italy, since 1968
- Kosovo, since 1945 when part of Yugoslavia
- Liechtenstein, since 1981
- Luxembourg, since 1981
- Malta, since 1974
- Monaco, since 1976
- Montenegro, since 1945 when part of Yugoslavia
- The Netherlands, since 1977
- North Macedonia, since 1945 when part of Yugoslavia
- Norway, since 1980
- Poland, since 1977
- San Marino, since 1966
- Serbia, since 1945 when part of Yugoslavia
- Slovakia, since 1979 when part of Czechoslovakia
- Slovenia, since 1983 when part of Yugoslavia
- Spain, since 1974 (except Canary Islands, which instead apply Western European Summer Time)
- Sweden, since 1980
- Switzerland, since 1981
- Vatican City, since 1966

The following countries have also used Central European Summer Time in the past:

- Libya, 1951–1959, 1982–1989, 1996–1997, 2012–2013
- Lithuania, 1998–1999
- Portugal, 1993–1995
- Tunisia, 2005–2008

== See also ==
- European Summer Time
- Time zone
