= Chekhovo, Kaliningrad Oblast =

Chekhovo Че́хово
- Rural locality
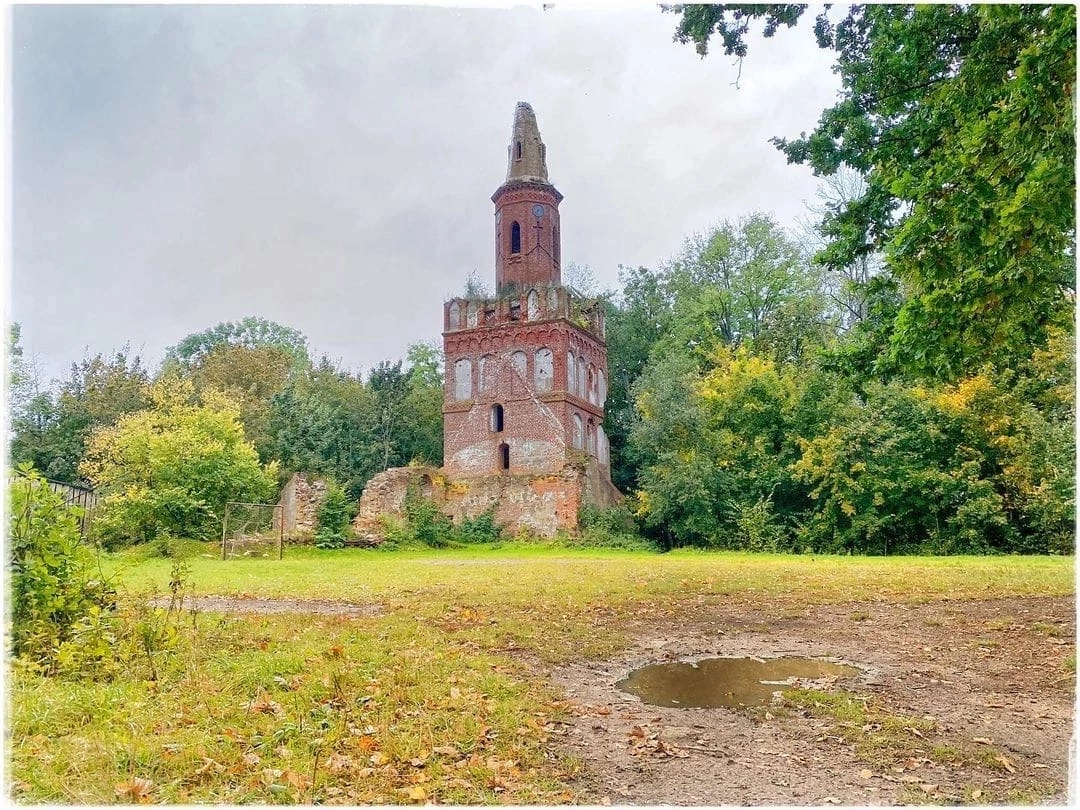
- Old church ruins
- Interactive map of Chekhovo
- Location of Chekhovo Chekhovo (European Russia) Chekhovo (Russia)
- Coordinates: 54°32′40″N 20°43′15″E
- Country: Russia
- Federal subject: Kaliningrad Oblast
- Founded: 1365
- Elevation: 42 m (138 ft)

Population
  - Estimate (2010): 564 )
- Time zone: UTC+2 (MSK–1)
- Postal code: 238423
- OKTMO ID: 27703000256

Chekhovo (Russian: Че́хово; German: Uderwangen; Polish: Wydry; Lithuanian: Udravangis) is a settlement in Bagrationovsky District of Kaliningrad Oblast, Russia.

== History ==
The village was founded in 1365. The name is of Old Prussian origin. The Dobrzyński Polish noble family lived in the village. In 1884, it had a population of 1,209.
