= Mendeleyevo, Kaliningrad Oblast =

Rural locality in Kaliningrad Oblast, Russia

Coordinates: 54°47′20″N 20°44′53″E

Mendeleyevo (Russian: Менделе́ево, German: Poggenpfuhl, Lithuanian: Pogenfulis) is a rural locality (a settlement) in the Guryevsky District, Kaliningrad Oblast, Russia.

== History ==
In 1454, King Casimir IV Jagiellon incorporated the region to the Kingdom of Poland upon the request of the Prussian Confederation – a league formed in opposition to the Teutonic Order. After the subsequent Thirteen Years' War (1454–1466), it became a part of Poland as a fief held by the Teutonic Knights.

From the 18th century it formed part of the Kingdom of Prussia, and from 1871 it was also part of the German Empire. On 30 April 1874 it became the seat of Amtsbezirk Poggenpfuhl within East Prussia. Until 1939 it was part of Landkreis Königsberg (Preußen), then from 1939 to 1945 part of Landkreis Samland im Regierungsbezirk Königsberg. Besides Poggenpful itself, the Amtsbezirk also contained the villages Brasdorf and Kuggen-Waldhaus.

On 1 December 1910 Poggenpfuhl contained 272 residents. The community expanded on 15 November 1928 by incorporating neighboring Kuggen. Its population was 482 in 1933 and 462 in 1939.

Poggenpfuhl was transferred to the Soviet Union in 1945 after World War II and subsequently renamed Mendeleyevo in 1946.
