= Kutuzovo, Guryevsky District =

Settlement in Kaliningrad Oblast

Kutuzovo Кутузово
- Rural locality
- Interactive map of Kutuzovo
- Location of Kutuzovo Kutuzovo (European Russia) Kutuzovo (Russia)
- Coordinates: 54°45′59″N 20°31′53″E
- Country: Russia
- Federal subject: Kaliningrad Oblast
- Administrative district: Guryevsky District

Population
  - Estimate (2010): 104 )
- Time zone: UTC+2 (MSK–1)
- Postal code: 236009
- OKTMO ID: 27707000326

Kutuzovo (Russian: Куту́зово; Lithuanian: Froileinhofas) is a rural locality in Guryevsky District of Kaliningrad Oblast, Russia. It is located in Sambia. It has a population of 104 (2010 census);

== Demographics ==
Distribution of the population by ethnicity according to the 2021 census:

	percent
Russians	15.92%
Tatars	1.91%
Uzbeks	1.27%
refused answer or no data	81.53%
