= Kutuzovo, Ozyorsky District =

Settlement in Kaliningrad Oblast

Kutuzovo Кутузово
- Rural locality
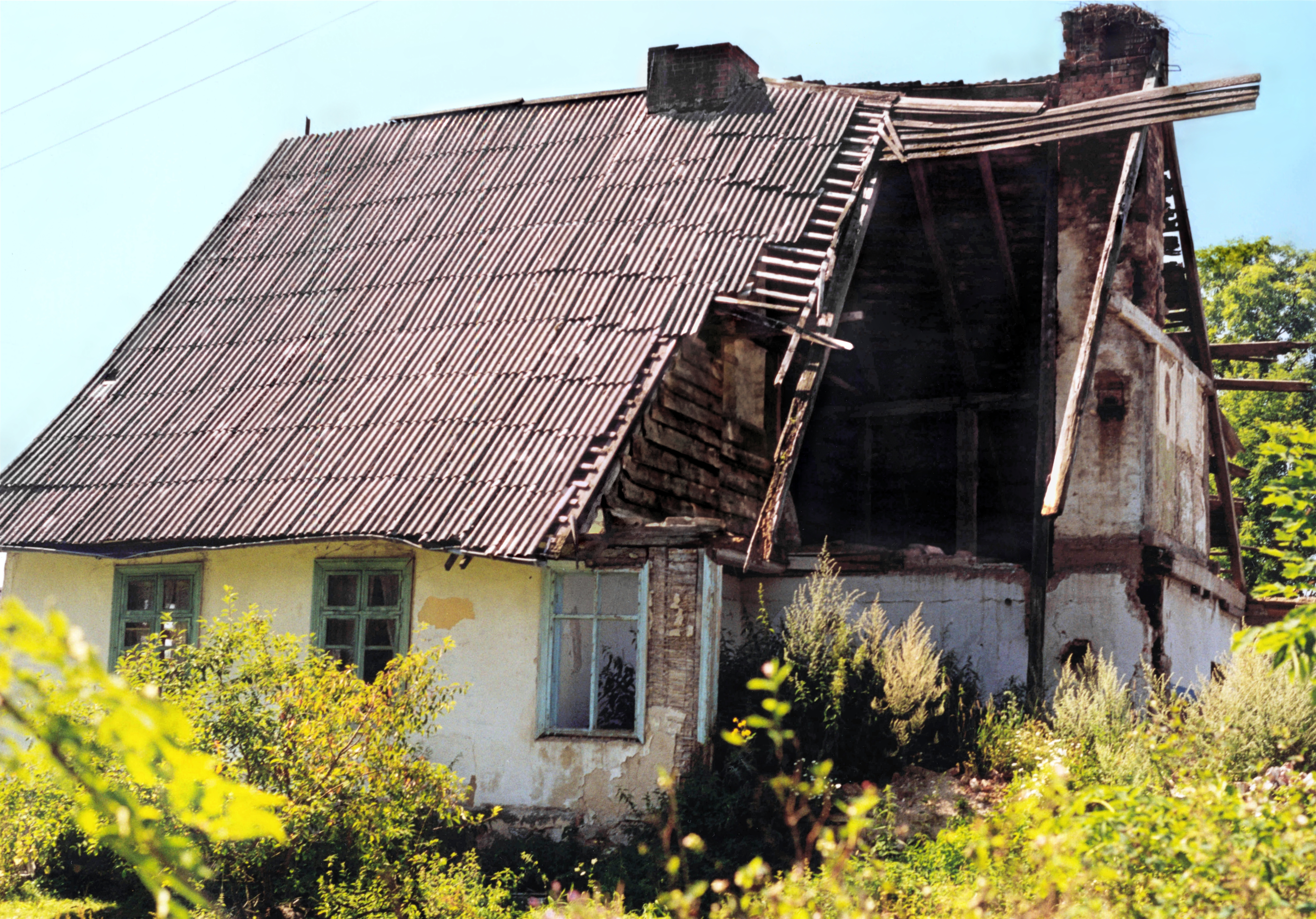
- Devastated house in 1999
- Interactive map of Kutuzovo
- Location of Kutuzovo Kutuzovo (European Russia) Kutuzovo (Russia)
- Coordinates: 54°21′0″N 22°8′0″E
- Country: Russia
- Federal subject: Kaliningrad Oblast
- Administrative district: Ozyorsky District

Population
  - Estimate (2010): 54 )
- Time zone: UTC+2 (MSK–1)
- Postal code: 238126
- OKTMO ID: 27716000151

Kutuzovo (Russian: Куту́зово; Polish: Kleszczewo, Lithuanian: Klišiai, German: Kleszowen) is a rural locality in Ozyorsky District of Kaliningrad Oblast, Russia, close to the border with Poland. It has a population of 54 (2010 census);

== History ==
The village had a mixed population. In the 18th century, Polish, Lithuanian and German-language services were held at the local church.

Initially following World War II, in 1945, the village passed to Poland as Kleszczewo, however, it was eventually annexed by the Soviet Union and renamed to Kutuzovo.
