= Maltsevo, Vologda Oblast =

Maltsevo Мальцево
- Village
- Location within Vologda Oblast Location within European Russia Location within Russia
- Coordinates: 59°38′N 37°34′E
- Country: Russia
- Region: Vologda Oblast
- District: Cherepovetsky District
- Time zone: UTC+3:00

Maltsevo (Russian: Мальцево) is a rural locality (a village) in Voskresenskoye Rural Settlement, Cherepovetsky District, Vologda Oblast, Russia. The population was 14 as of 2002.

== Geography ==
Maltsevo is located 72 km (45 mi) northwest of Cherepovets (the district's administrative centre) by road. Popovo is the nearest rural locality.
