= Logvino, Kaliningrad Oblast =

Logvino Логвино
- Rural locality
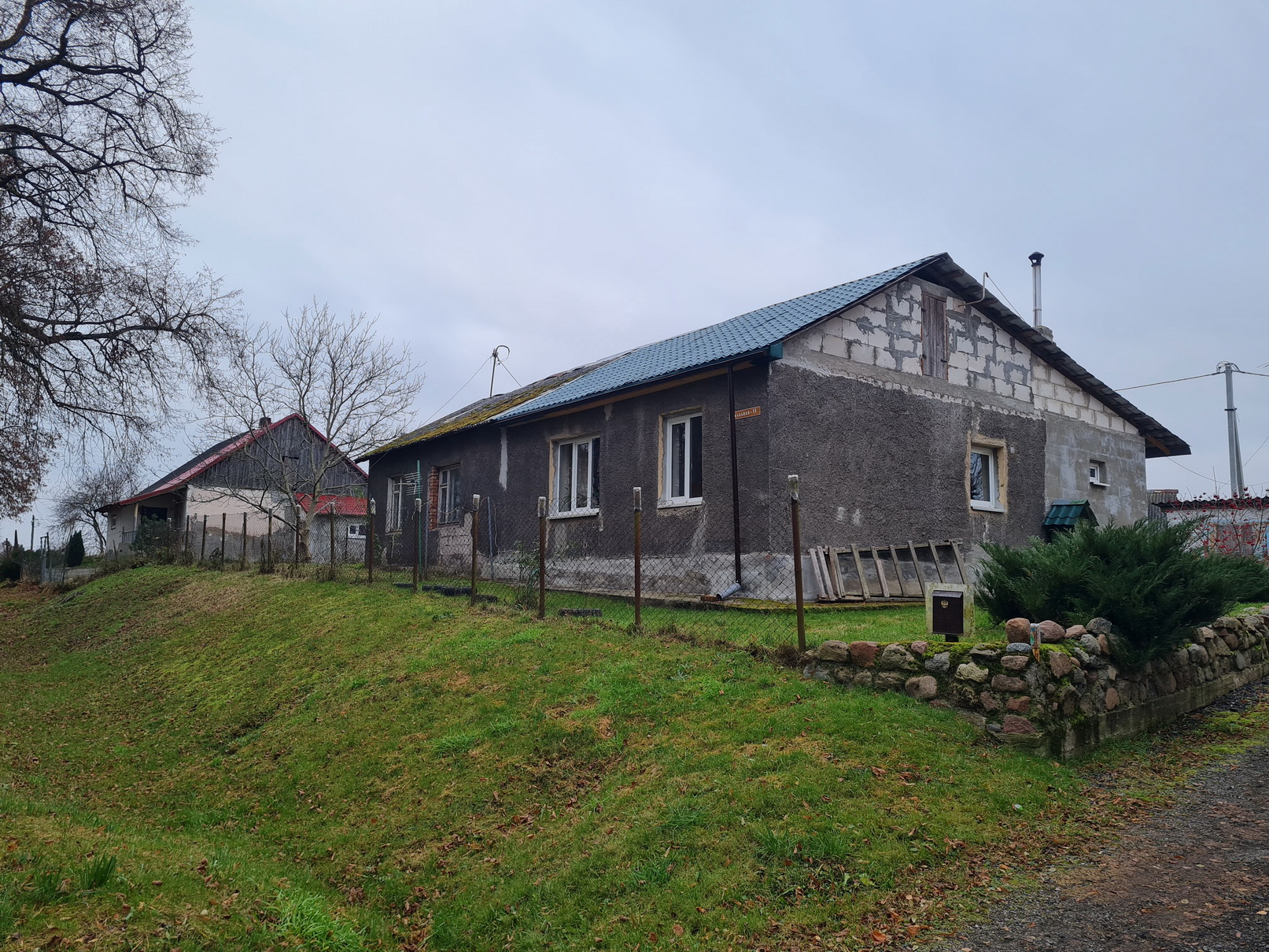
- Interactive map of Logvino
- Location of Logvino Logvino (European Russia) Logvino (Russia)
- Coordinates: 54°45′58″N 20°12′33″E
- Country: Russia
- Federal subject: Kaliningrad Oblast

Population
  - Estimate (2010): 283 )
- Time zone: UTC+2 (MSK–1)
- Postal code: 238346
- OKTMO ID: 27710000616

Logvino (Russian: Логвино; Polish: Medenowo; Lithuanian: Medenava) is a rural settlement in Zelenogradsky District of Kaliningrad Oblast, Russia. It is located in Sambia.

== History ==
The area was destroyed by King Ottokar II of Bohemia in 1255.
