= Avangardnoye =

Avangardnoye Авангардное
- Village
- Location within Kaliningrad Oblast Location within Russia
- Coordinates: 54°45′N 20°39′E
- Country: Russia
- Region: Kaliningrad Oblast
- District: Guryevsky District
- Time zone: UTC+2:00

Avangardnoye (Russian: Аванга́рдное; German: Bulitten) is a rural locality (a settlement) in Kutuzovskoye Rural Settlement of Guryevsky District, Kaliningrad Oblast, Russia. The population was 159 as of 2010. There are 18 streets.

== Geography ==
Avangardnoye is located 7 km southeast of Guryevsk (the district's administrative centre) by road. Cheryomkhovo is the nearest rural locality.
