= Uzlovoye, Guryevsky District =

Settlement in Kaliningrad Oblast

Uzlovoye Узловое
- Rural locality
- Interactive map of Uzlovoye
- Location of Uzlovoye Uzlovoye (European Russia) Uzlovoye (Russia)
- Coordinates: 54°51′35″N 20°45′44″E
- Country: Russia
- Federal subject: Kaliningrad Oblast

Population
  - Estimate (2021): 107 )
- Time zone: UTC+2 (MSK–1)
- Postal code: 238317
- OKTMO ID: 27707000816

Uzlovoye (Russian: Узловое, Lithuanian: Nojendorfas) is a rural settlement in Guryevsky District, Kaliningrad Oblast, Russia. It is in the historic region of Sambia.

According to the 2021 census, the village had a population of 107, 32.7% Russian, 30.8% Yazidi, 7.5% Azeri and 30.0% unknown nown.
