= Nemanskoye (rural locality) =

Nemanskoye Неманское
- Rural locality
- Interactive map of Nemanskoye
- Location of Nemanskoye Nemanskoye (European Russia) Nemanskoye (Russia)
- Coordinates: 55°2′58″N 22°23′23″E
- Country: Russia
- Federal subject: Kaliningrad Oblast

Population
  - Estimate (2021): 542 )
- Time zone: UTC+2 (MSK–1)
- Postal code: 238733
- OKTMO ID: 27713000181

Nemanskoye (Russian: Неманское, German: Trappönen (1938-1945 Trappen), Lithuanian: Trapėnai) is a rural settlement in Krasnoznamensky District of Kaliningrad Oblast, Russia. It is located in the historic region of Lithuania Minor, on the border with Lithuania.

== Demographics ==
Distribution of the population by ethnicity according to the 2021 census:

| | percent |
| Russians | 82.66% |
| Lithuanians | 11.99% |
| Armenians | 2.40% |
| Ukrainians | 0.92% |
| Belarusians | 0.55% |
| Azeris | 0.55% |
| Georgians | 0.37% |
| Poles | 0.18% |
| Refused answer or no data | 0.37% |
