= Maltsevo, Kaliningrad Oblast =

Settlement in Kaliningrad Oblast

Maltsevo Мальцево
- Rural locality
- Interactive map of Maltsevo
- Location of Maltsevo Maltsevo (European Russia) Maltsevo (Russia)
- Coordinates: 54°22′20″N 21°43′0″E
- Country: Russia
- Federal subject: Kaliningrad Oblast

Population
  - Estimate (2010): 467 )
- Time zone: UTC+2 (MSK–1)
- Postal code: 238132
- OKTMO ID: 27716000331

Maltsevo (Russian: Мальцево; Polish: Karpówko or Karpowo Małe; Lithuanian: Mažoji Karpava) is a rural locality in Ozyorsky District of Kaliningrad Oblast, Russia, near the border with Poland. It has a population of 467 (2010 census); 471 (2002 census);

== History ==
The village was founded by Polish people as Karpowo.

Initially following World War II, in 1945, the village passed to Poland as Karpówko, however, it was eventually annexed by the Soviet Union and renamed to Maltsevo.
