= Polessky District =

Polessky District Полесский район (Russian)
- District
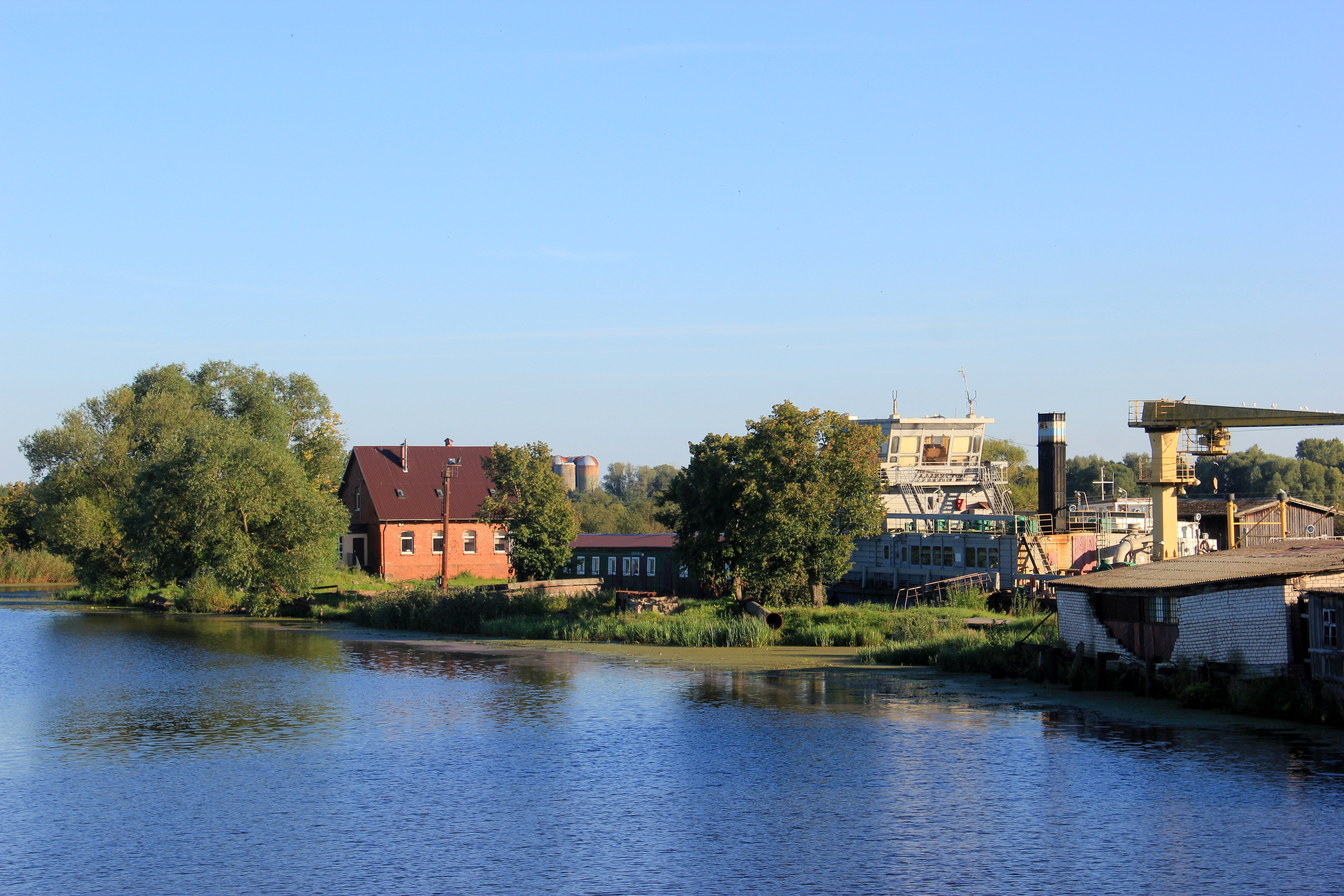
- Labiau Castle, a cultural heritage monument in Polessky District

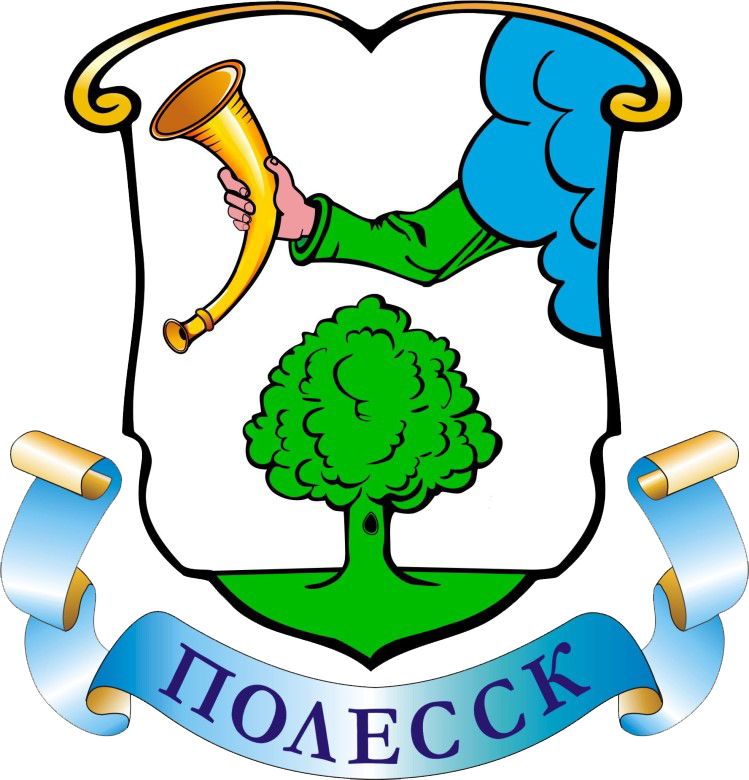
- Coat of arms
- Location of Polessky District in Kaliningrad Oblast
- Coordinates: 54°51′N 21°30′E
- Country: Russia
- Federal subject: Kaliningrad Oblast
- Established: April 7, 1946
- Administrative center: Polessk

Area
  - Total: 834.3 km^{2} (322.1 sq mi)

Population (2010 Census)
  - Total: 19,205
  - Density: 23.02/km^{2} (59.62/sq mi)
  - Urban: 39.5%
  - Rural: 60.5%

Administrative structure
  - Administrative divisions: 1 Towns of district significance, 4 Rural okrugs
  - Inhabited localities: 1 cities/towns, 66 rural localities

Municipal structure
  - Municipally incorporated as: Polessky Municipal District
  - Municipal divisions: 1 urban settlements, 4 rural settlements
- Time zone: UTC+2 (MSK–1)
- OKTMO ID: 27718000
- Website: http://polessk.gov39.ru

Population of Polessky District
- 2010 Census: 19,205
- 2002 Census: 19,018
- 1989 Census: 16,911
- 1979 Census: 17,324

Polessky District (Russian: Поле́сский райо́н) is an administrative district (raion), one of the fifteen in Kaliningrad Oblast, Russia. As a municipal division, it is incorporated as Polessky Municipal District. It is located in the center of the oblast. The area of the district is 834.3 square kilometers (322.1 sq mi). Its administrative center is the town of Polessk. As of the 2010 Census, the total population of the district was 19,205, with the population of Polessk accounting for 39.5% of that number.

== Geography ==
The district is situated in the center of the oblast, with the Curonian Lagoon to the north. The Deyma River, a branch of the Pregolya, flows through the district. Near Polessk, the Polessk Canal connects the Pregolya and the Neman Rivers, crossing a bog.

== History ==
The district was established on April 7, 1946 as Labiausky District (Лабиауский район). It was given its present name on September 7, 1946.

== Economy ==
Economy is focused on fishery and agriculture. The railway line from Kaliningrad to Sovetsk, and the Kaliningrad–Guryevsk–Polessk–Bolshakovo road lead parallel with the shore of the Curonian Lagoon.
