= Nesterovsky District =

Nesterovsky District Нестеровский район (Russian)
- District
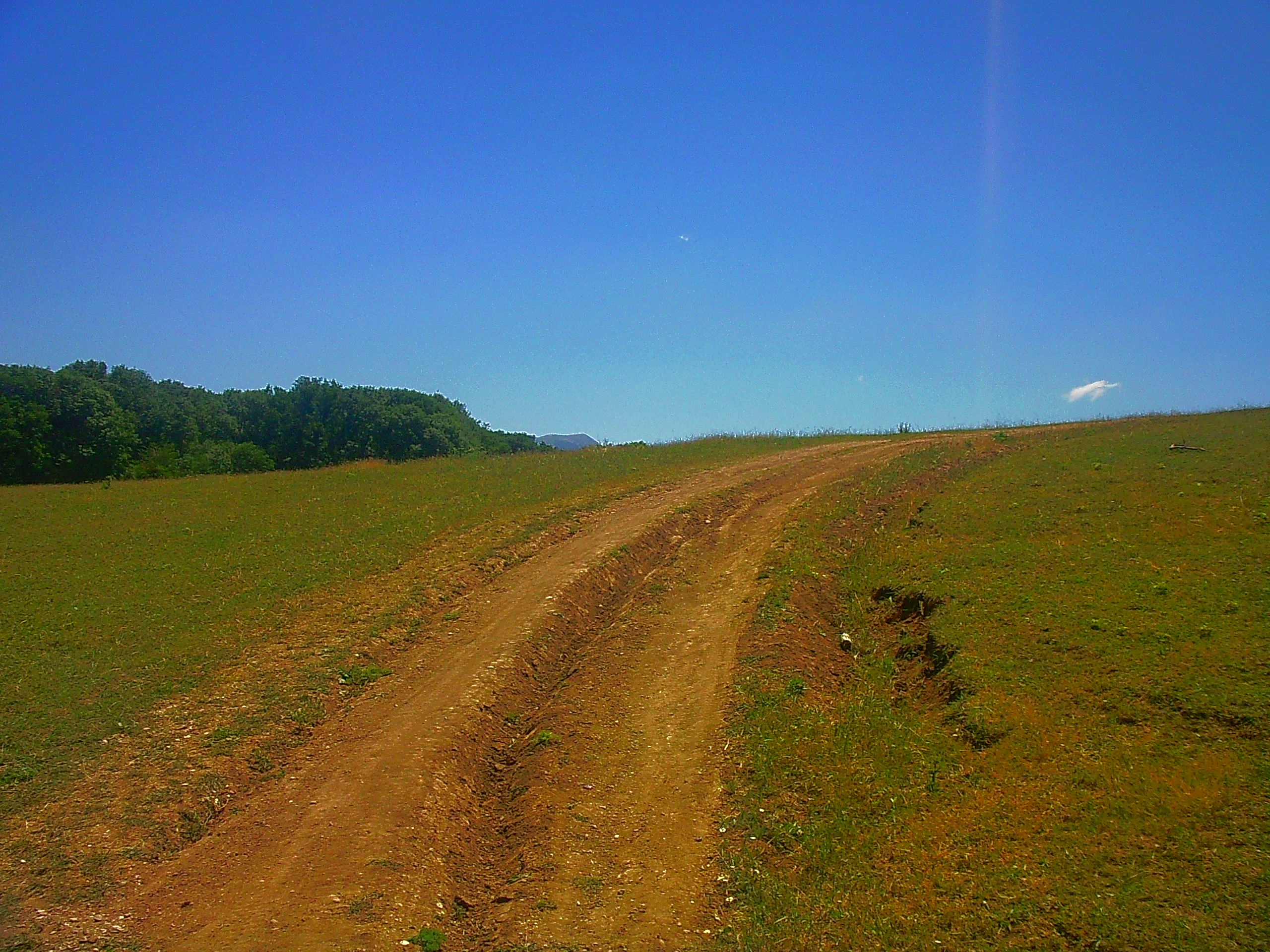
- Krasnolesye, Nesterovsky District

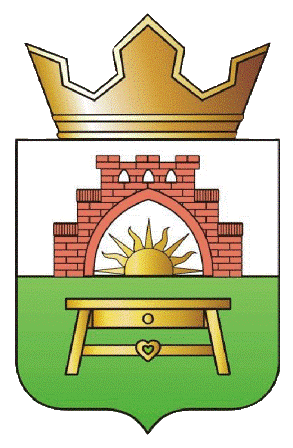
- Flag Coat of arms
- Location of Nesterovsky District in Kaliningrad Oblast
- Coordinates: 54°38′N 22°34′E
- Country: Russia
- Federal subject: Kaliningrad Oblast
- Established: 1946
- Administrative center: Nesterov

Area
  - Total: 1,062 km^{2} (410 sq mi)

Population (2010 Census)
  - Total: 16,213
  - Density: 15.27/km^{2} (39.54/sq mi)
  - Urban: 28.3%
  - Rural: 71.7%

Administrative structure
  - Administrative divisions: 1 Towns of district significance, 3 Rural okrugs
  - Inhabited localities: 1 cities/towns, 53 rural localities

Municipal structure
  - Municipally incorporated as: Nesterovsky Municipal District
  - Municipal divisions: 1 urban settlements, 3 rural settlements
- Time zone: UTC+2 (MSK–1)
- OKTMO ID: 27624000
- Website: http://www.admnesterov.ru

Nesterovsky District (Russian: Не́стеровский райо́н) is an administrative district (raion), one of the fifteen in Kaliningrad Oblast, Russia. As a municipal division, it is incorporated as Nesterovsky Municipal District. It is located in the southeast of the oblast and borders with Krasnoznamensky District in the north, Marijampolė County to the east in Lithuania, Warmia-Masuria in the south in Poland and with Gusevsky and Ozyorsky Districts in the west. The area of the district is 1,062 square kilometers (410 sq mi). Its administrative center is the town of Nesterov. Population: 16,213 (2010 census); 17,250 (2002 Census); 15,181 (1989 Soviet census). The population of Nesterov accounts for 28.3% of the district's total population.

== Border crossings ==
Chernyshevskoye railway station is an important border railway station to Lithuania on the line from Kaliningrad to Moscow through Lithuania and Belarus. In Chernyshevskoye, an important border crossing point on the principal road connecting Kaliningrad to Moscow, is located.

== Miscellaneous ==
Near the settlement of Yasnaya Polyana, the former stable of the Trakehner horse breed is located, as well as a museum for the breed.
