= Chernyakhovsky District =

Chernyakhovsky District Черняховский район (Russian)
- District
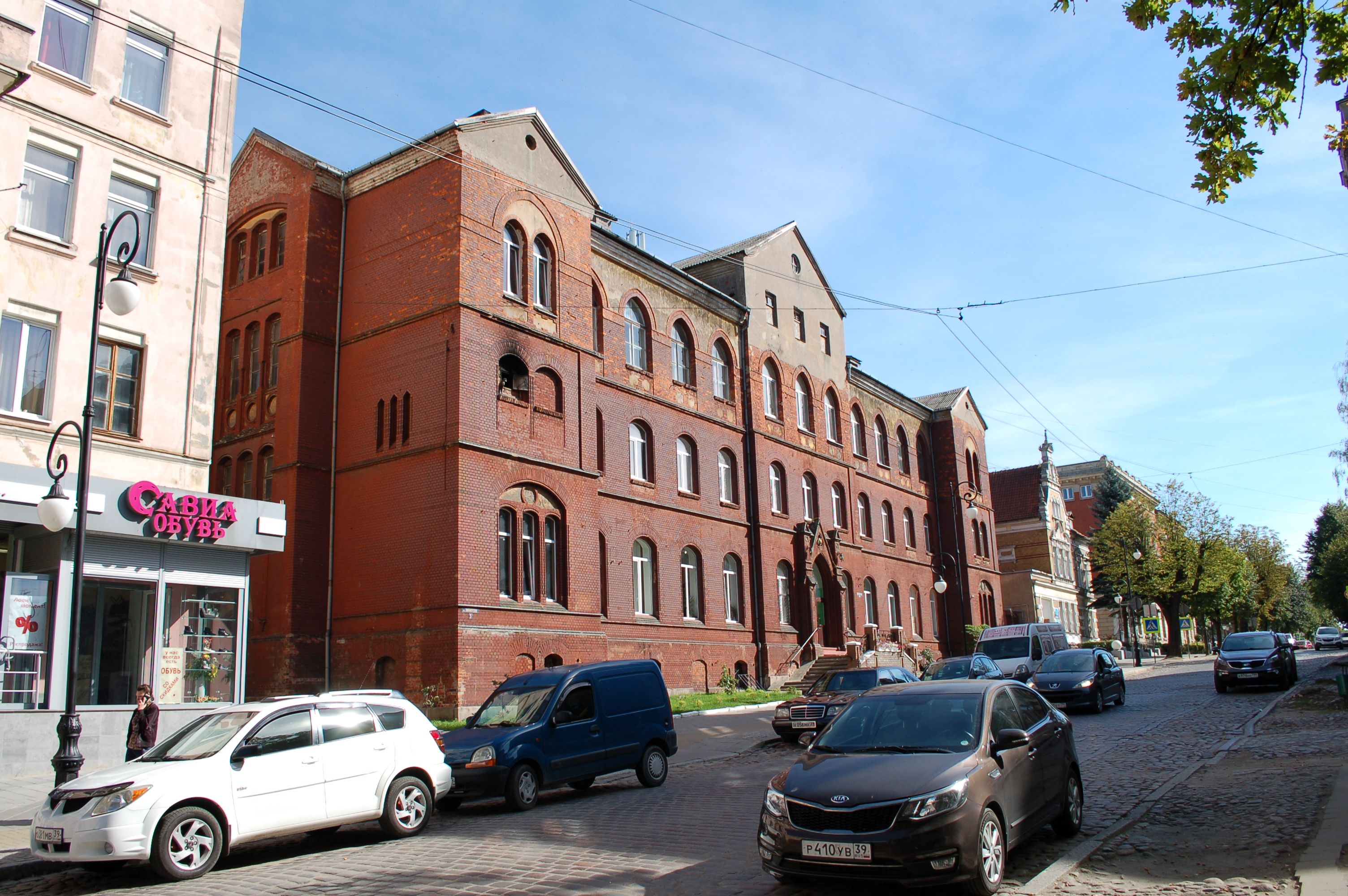
- Post office building, Chernyakhovsk

- Flag Coat of arms
- Location of Chernyakhovsky District in Kaliningrad Oblast
- Coordinates: 54°38′N 21°49′E
- Country: Russia
- Federal subject: Kaliningrad Oblast
- Established: 7 April 1946
- Administrative center: Chernyakhovsk

Area
  - Total: 1,285.75 km^{2} (496.43 sq mi)

Population (2010 Census)
  - Total: 51,936
  - Density: 40.394/km^{2} (104.62/sq mi)
  - Urban: 77.9%
  - Rural: 22.1%

Administrative structure
  - Administrative divisions: 1 Towns of district significance, 3 Rural okrugs
  - Inhabited localities: 1 cities/towns, 101 rural localities

Municipal structure
  - Municipally incorporated as: Chernyakhovsky Municipal District
  - Municipal divisions: 1 urban settlements, 3 rural settlements
- Website: https://web.archive.org/web/20120814110333/http://inster39.ru/

Chernyakhovsky District (Russian: Черняховский райо́н) is an administrative district (raion), one of the fifteen in Kaliningrad Oblast, Russia. As a municipal division, it is incorporated as Chernyakhovsky Municipal District. It is located in the center of the oblast. The area of the district is 1,285.75 square kilometers (496.43 sq mi). Its administrative center is the town of Chernyakhovsk. Population: 51,936 (2010 census); 57,521 (2002 Census); 12,806 (1989 Soviet census). The population of Chernyakhovsk accounts for 77.9% of the district's total population.

== Transportation ==
The main railway line from Kaliningrad to Moscow passes through the district; there are two more railway lines from Chernyakhovsk to Zheleznodorozhny and from Chernyakhovsk to Sovetsk. The main road from Kaliningrad to Moscow via Lithuania also passes through the district.
