= Kaliningrad Time =

Time zone (UTC+2)

- Time zone

UTC offset
- KALT: UTC+02:00

Current time
- 17:18, 15 February 2026 KALT [refresh]

Observance of DST
- DST is not observed in this time zone.

Time in Russia: KALT / Kaliningrad Time / UTC+2 / (MSK−1); MSK / Moscow Time / UTC+3 / (MSK±0); SAMT / Samara Time / UTC+4 / (MSK+1); YEKT / Yekaterinburg Time / UTC+5 / (MSK+2); OMST / Omsk Time / UTC+6 / (MSK+3); KRAT / Krasnoyarsk Time / UTC+7 / (MSK+4); IRKT / Irkutsk Time / UTC+8 / (MSK+5); YAKT / Yakutsk Time / UTC+9 / (MSK+6); VLAT / Vladivostok Time / UTC+10 / (MSK+7); MAGT / Magadan Time / UTC+11 / (MSK+8); PETT / Kamchatka Time / UTC+12 / (MSK+9)

Time in Europe: Light Blue / Western European Time / Greenwich Mean Time (UTC); Blue / Western European Time / Greenwich Mean Time (UTC); Blue / Western European Summer Time / British Summer Time / Irish Standard Time (UTC+1); Red / Central European Time (UTC+1); Red / Central European Summer Time (UTC+2); Yellow / Eastern European Time / Kaliningrad Time (UTC+2); Ochre / Eastern European Time (UTC+2); Ochre / Eastern European Summer Time (UTC+3); Green / Moscow Time / Turkey Time (UTC+3); Turquoise / Armenia Time / Azerbaijan Time / Georgia Time / Samara Time (UTC+4); ▉▉▉▉ Pale hues: Standard time observed all year ▉▉▉ Dark hues: Daylight saving time

Kaliningrad Time (KALT; Russian: калининградское время, romanized: kaliningradskoye vremya) is the time zone two hours ahead of UTC (UTC+02:00) and one hour behind Moscow Time (MSK−1). It is used in Kaliningrad Oblast.

Until 2011, Kaliningrad Time was identical to Eastern European Time (UTC+02:00; UTC+03:00 with daylight saving time). On 27 March 2011, Russia moved to permanent DST, switching Kaliningrad time permanently to UTC+03:00. On 26 October 2014, this law was reversed but daylight saving time was not reintroduced, so Kaliningrad is now permanently set to UTC+02:00.

Main cities:

- Kaliningrad
- Sovetsk
- Chernyakhovsk

== IANA time zone database ==
In the zone.tab of the IANA time zone database, the zone with the same current offset is:

c.c.	Coordinates	Timezone name	Comments	UTC offset
RU	+5443+02030	Europe/Kaliningrad	MSK-01 – Kaliningrad	+02:00

== See also ==
- Time in Russia
