= Cultural heritage of Kaliningrad Oblast =

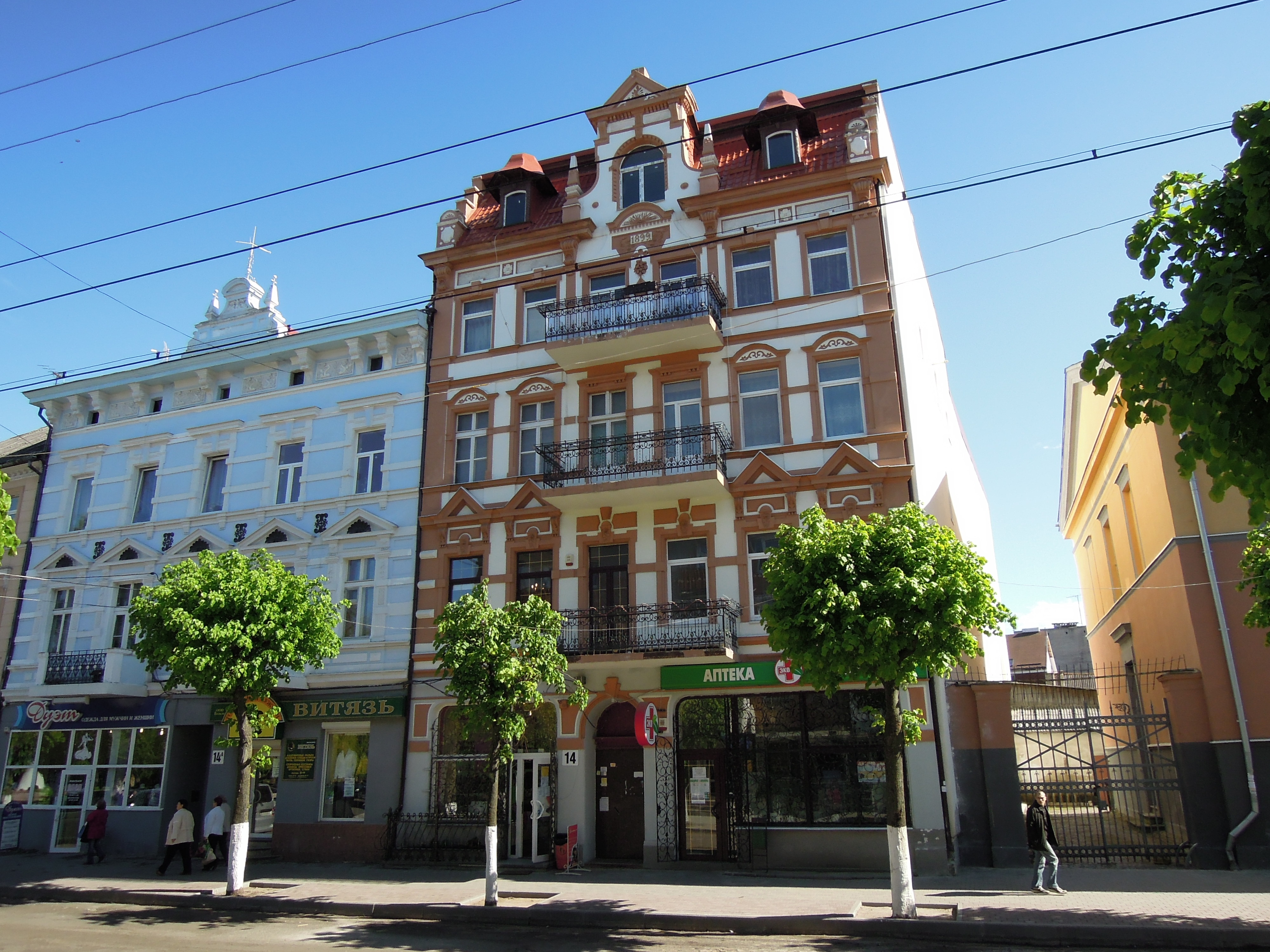
The old town of Sovetsk, with German-era buildings

The cultural heritage of Kaliningrad Oblast is a mixture of the pre-World War II German, Lithuanian and Polish heritage, dating back to the Ducal Prussian and East Prussian periods, and the Soviet and Russian designs constructed since then.

== History ==
Many heritage sites in Kaliningrad Oblast were damaged during World War II, or willfully destroyed in the postwar period by Soviet authorities. A number of landmarks did survive, such as the gothic Königsberg Cathedral containing the tomb of Kant, or the Königsberg Stock Exchange building. Already in the 1960s, a group of local architects and intellectuals began to campaign for the preservation of the region's German heritage, albeit unsuccessfully.

The first Soviet housing blocks were built only in 1966. The spread of Soviet-style prefabricated panel buildings eventually changed the appearance of Kaliningrad. The 1970s House of Soviets is another part of the local Soviet architectural period.

Mirroring the rediscovery of pre-revolutionary history in the rest of Russia, since 1991 there have been many efforts to recover the prewar heritage sites of Kaliningrad. Preservation and reconstruction efforts are hampered by a complicated property ownership situation, as during the 1990s the city administration raised cash by selling land for construction without regard for central planning.

Old buildings are being restored, and new ones built in conscious imitation of the old Königsberg architecture. Some local architects are cautious about the reconstruction efforts, worried that the result may end up looking too kitsch and unauthentic.

Königsberg Cathedral was successfully restored from 1992 to 1998, in a joint Russian-German project. The Fischerdorf development, while being a new development, is a city quarter that intentionally mirrors the prewar architectural styles. A project to restore Kant's House in Veselovka was announced in 2013, and should be completed in time for the 2018 World Cup.

The ruins of Königsberg Castle are being excavated, with a plan to preserve them under a transparent enclosure.

== Lithuanian heritage ==
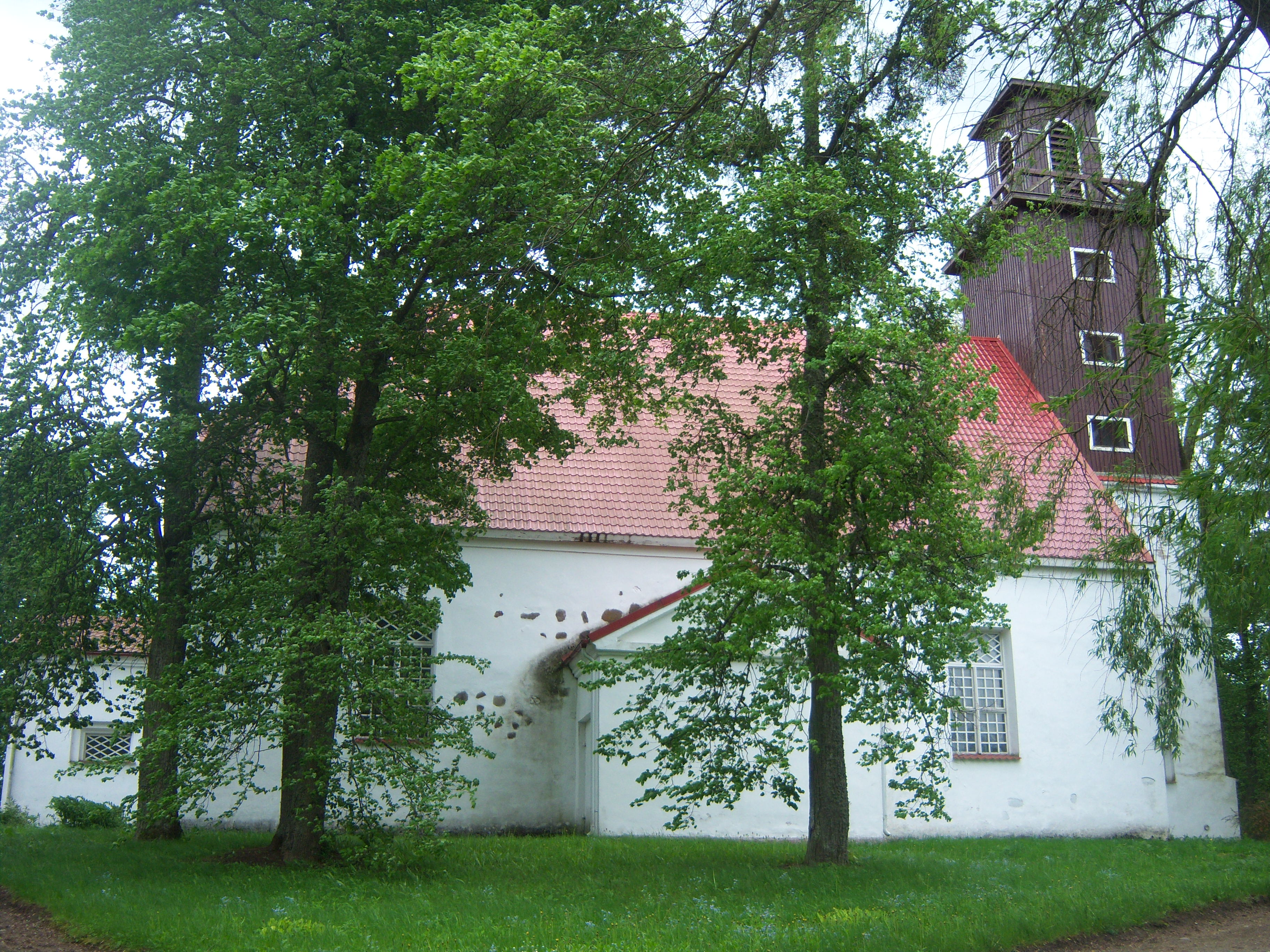
Memorial Museum of Kristijonas Donelaitis in Chistye Prudy

The eastern part of the current Kaliningrad Oblast was part of the region of Lithuania Minor, traditionally inhabited by Lithuanian people, and preserved Lithuanian heritage is thus mostly located there. In Chistye Prudy (Lithuanian: Tolminkiemis), there is a Memorial Museum of Kristijonas Donelaitis, author of The Seasons, the first Lithuanian poem. Several churches, which hosted Lithuanian services for the region's Lithuanian population in the past, are located in the province, including the preserved churches in Bolshakovo (Skaisgiriai), Chistye Prudy (Tolminkiemis), Slavsk (Gastos), Saranskoe (Laukiška) and Telmanovo (Didlaukiai), and the either partially preserved or ruined churches in Chernyshevskoye (Eitkūnai), Glushkovo (Plybiškė), Kalinino (Mielkiemis), Krasnogorskoye (Nybudžiai), Krylovo (Ašvėnai), Lermontovo (Išdagai), Mayakovskoye (Nemirkiemis), Mayovka (Jurbarkas), Mezhdurechye (Narkyčiai), Ozyorsk (Darkiemis), Pushkino (Gėritai), Ulyanovo (Kraupiškas), Vesnovo (Kusai), Volodarovka (Juodlaukiai), Vysokoye (Papelkiai) and Yablonovka (Klikučiai). The Lithuanian Church in Sovetsk (Tilžė), traditional capital of Lithuania Minor, was destroyed by the Soviets in 1951–1952. The Catholic parish church at Sackheim in Kaliningrad (Karaliaučius), the oldest post-Reformation Catholic church in Königsberg, which hosted Lithuanian services, was destroyed in the 1960s. Several other such churches were destroyed after the war, including in Chernyakhovsk (Įsrutis), Chkalovo (Enciūnai), Gavrilovo (Gavaičiai), Kalinovka (Aulavėnai), Mayskoye (Malviškiai), Polessk (Labguva) and Sadovoye (Balėtai).

In recent years, there have been cases of Lithuanian traces being removed in the region, with the removal of a memorial plaque to Lithuanian philosopher and writer Vydūnas from his former home in Sovetsk in 2022, and the renaming of the Memorial Museum of Kristijonas Donelaitis to the Literature Museum in 2025.

== Polish heritage ==
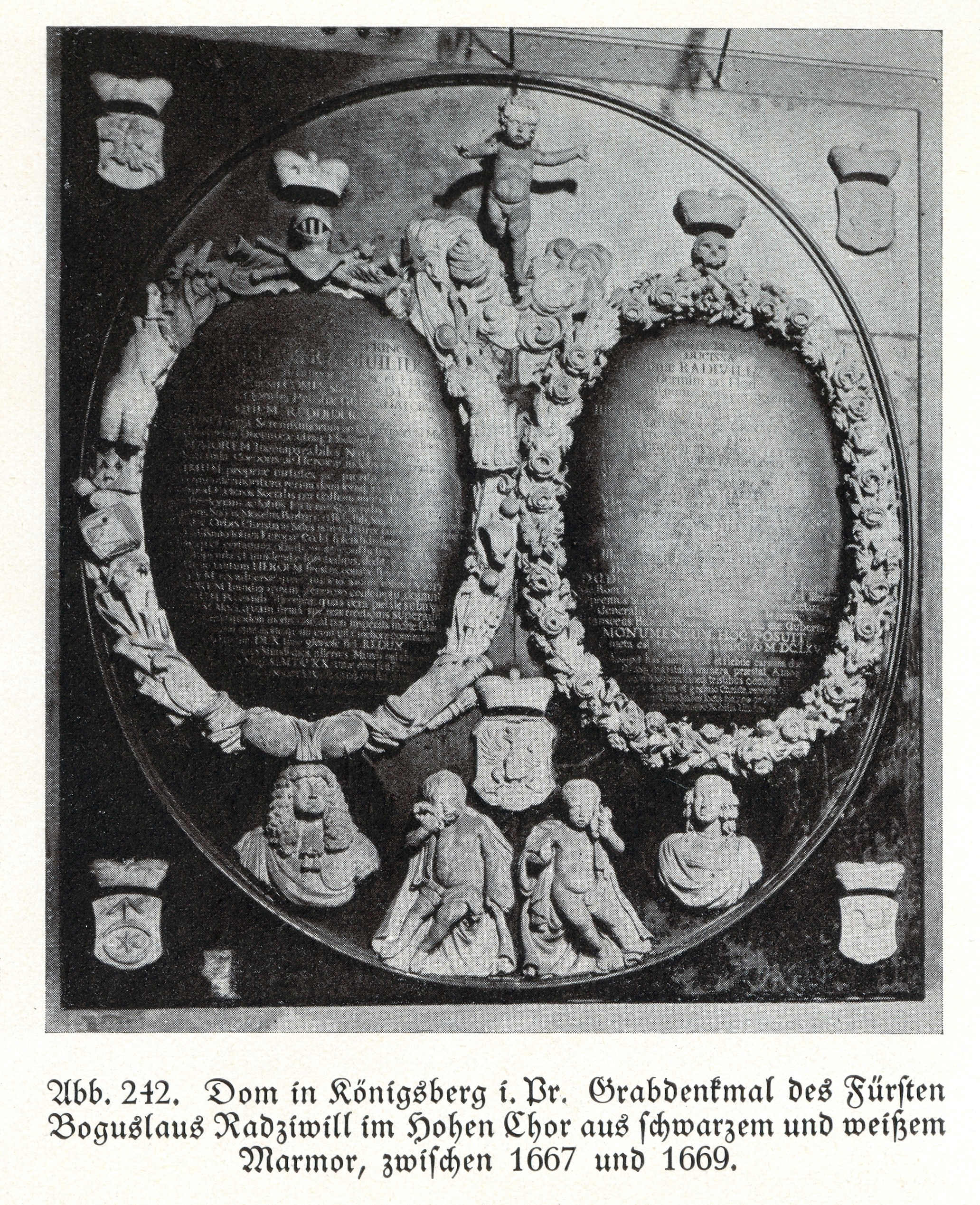
Pre-war photo of the epitaph of Bogusław Radziwiłł

Polish people historically inhabited especially Königsberg (Polish: Królewiec) and the current southern border strip, plus some locations in the central (e.g. Chernyakhovsk/Wystruć, Znamensk/Welawa and Zagorskoye) and northern parts of the current oblast.

The three main churches of Polish Lutherans, Catholics and Calvinists in Königsberg (Królewiec) were destroyed by the Soviets in the 1950s and 1960s, i.e. the Lutheran Polish Church at Steindamm (Kamienna Grobla), the main Polish Church and the city's oldest church, where Jan Seklucjan, publisher of the oldest Polish translation of the New Testament, was a pastor in the mid-16th century, the Catholic parish church at Sackheim, the city's oldest post-Reformation Catholic church, which was built thanks to the efforts of King Sigismund III Vasa of Poland and the Polish Bishop of Warmia Szymon Rudnicki, and whose parish priests were required to know the Polish language since its foundation in the 1610s until the second half of the 19th century, and the Reformed Church, which hosted services of the Polish Reformed congregation until 1806. In 1972, the Soviets destroyed the main church of Chernyakhovsk (Wystruć), which also hosted Polish services in the past. The old church of Krylovo (Nordenbork), in which Polish services were held, is partially preserved. The Königsberg Cathedral was historically also a place of worship for local Poles with Polish-language services held there until the 18th century. It contains the epitaph of 17th-century Polish princely magnate Bogusław Radziwiłł and his wife Anna Maria, renovated in 2007–2008 with funds from the Polish Ministry of Culture and National Heritage. The Königsberg Castle, which served as a residence of Polish Kings Władysław IV Vasa (in 1635) and Stanisław Leszczyński (in 1734–1736), and hosted the city's first Polish Reformed Church services since 1655, was destroyed by the Russians in 1968–1969.

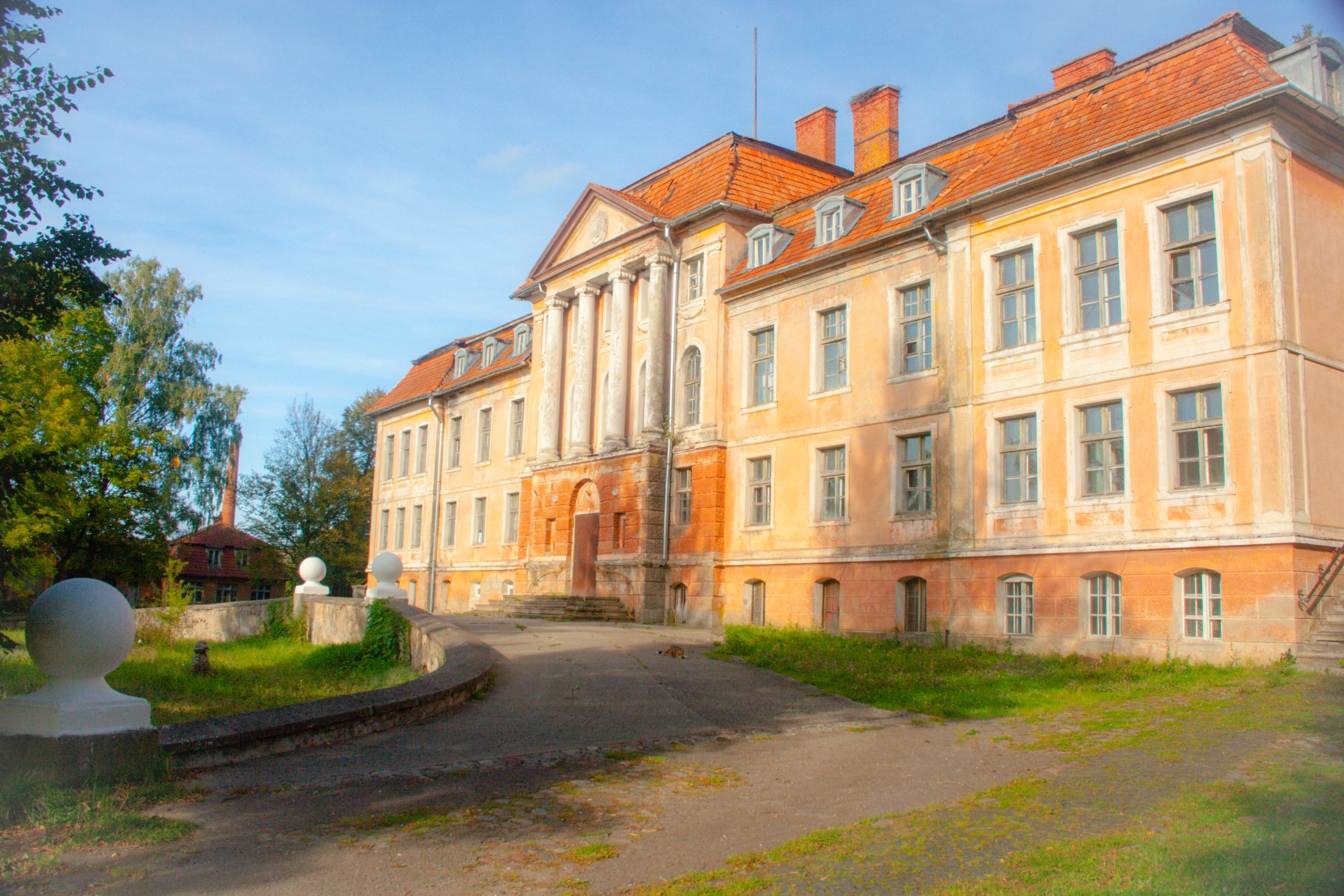
Former office of the Gierdawy County of Poland

A number of villages in the current southern border strip were founded by Poles several centuries ago, e.g. Kazachye (Piątki), Nekrasovo (Karpowo Wielkie), Maltsevo (Karpówko), Kochkino (Popówko), Perovo (Sokoły), Michurino (Chorzele) and Chorzelki. The south-eastern corner of the oblast is historically considered part of the region of Masuria, which has been largely inhabited by Poles since the late Middle Ages and the remainder of which is located in Poland. In 1945, the southern border strip even initially passed under Polish control with Polish administration organized in the towns of Gierdawy and Iławka, however, the Polish administration was eventually expelled and the area was annexed by the Soviet Union and included within the Kaliningrad Oblast.

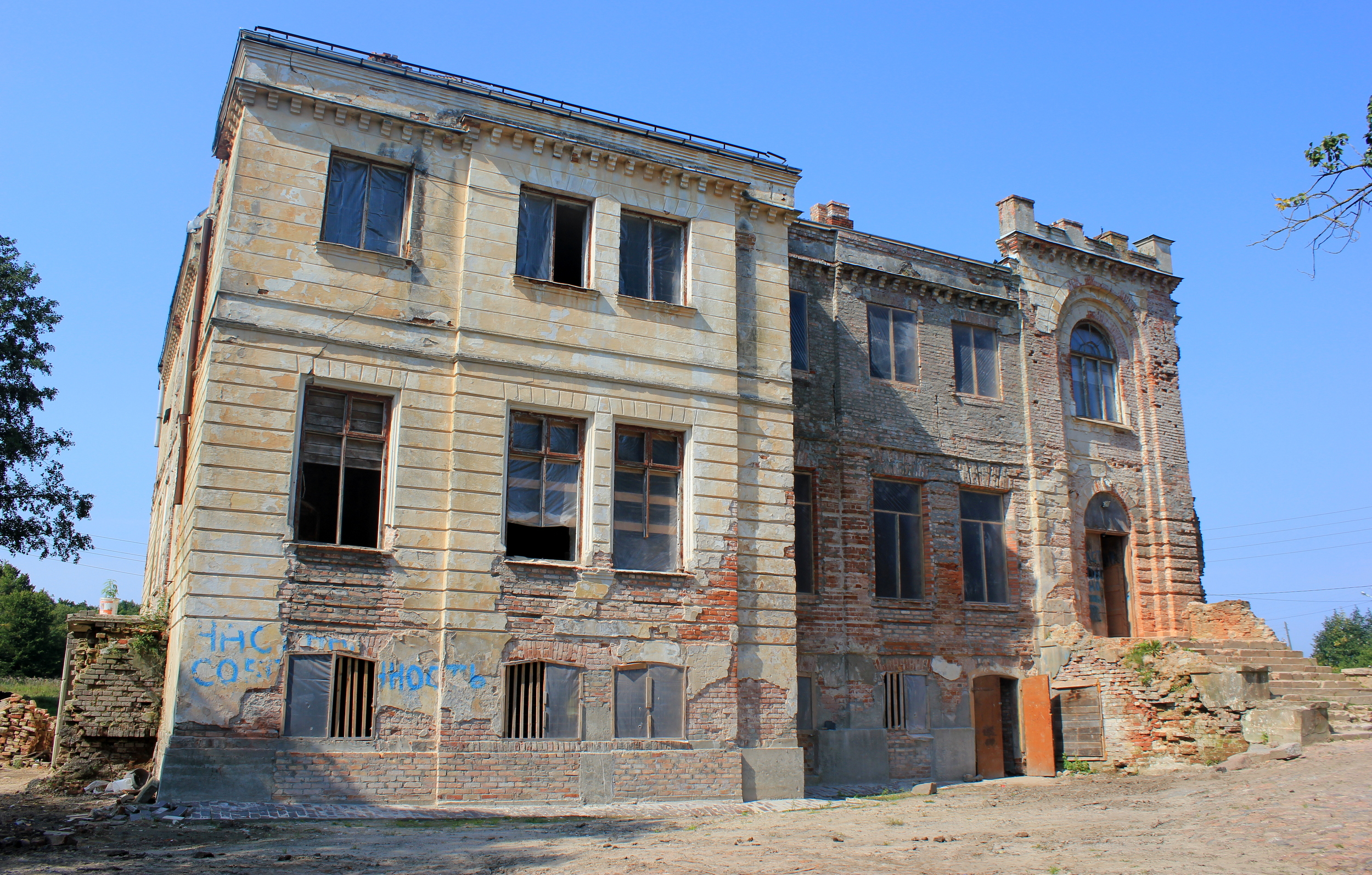
Palace in Roshchino

In the oblast there are several preserved sites of imprisonment of Poles by Nazi Germany during World War II, including the former psychiatric hospital in Gvardeysk (Tapiewo), where Polish teachers, schoolchildren and prisoners-of-war were held, and the old palace in Roshchino, where Polish teachers and schoolchildren were held. In 2011, a Polish-built monument with Polish and Russian inscriptions was unveiled at the site of the former Hohenbruch concentration camp at Gromovo where Nazi Germany imprisoned mostly Poles, especially intelligentsia. There is an international cemetery of prisoners of the Stalag I-A German prisoner-of-war camp, which contains graves of Polish POWs, in the village of Dolgorukovo (Stabławki), near the border with Poland.

In 2015, a monument of Polish poet Adam Mickiewicz was erected in Zelenogradsk (Koronowo) to commemorate his visit in 1824.

== Gallery ==
=== Castles ===
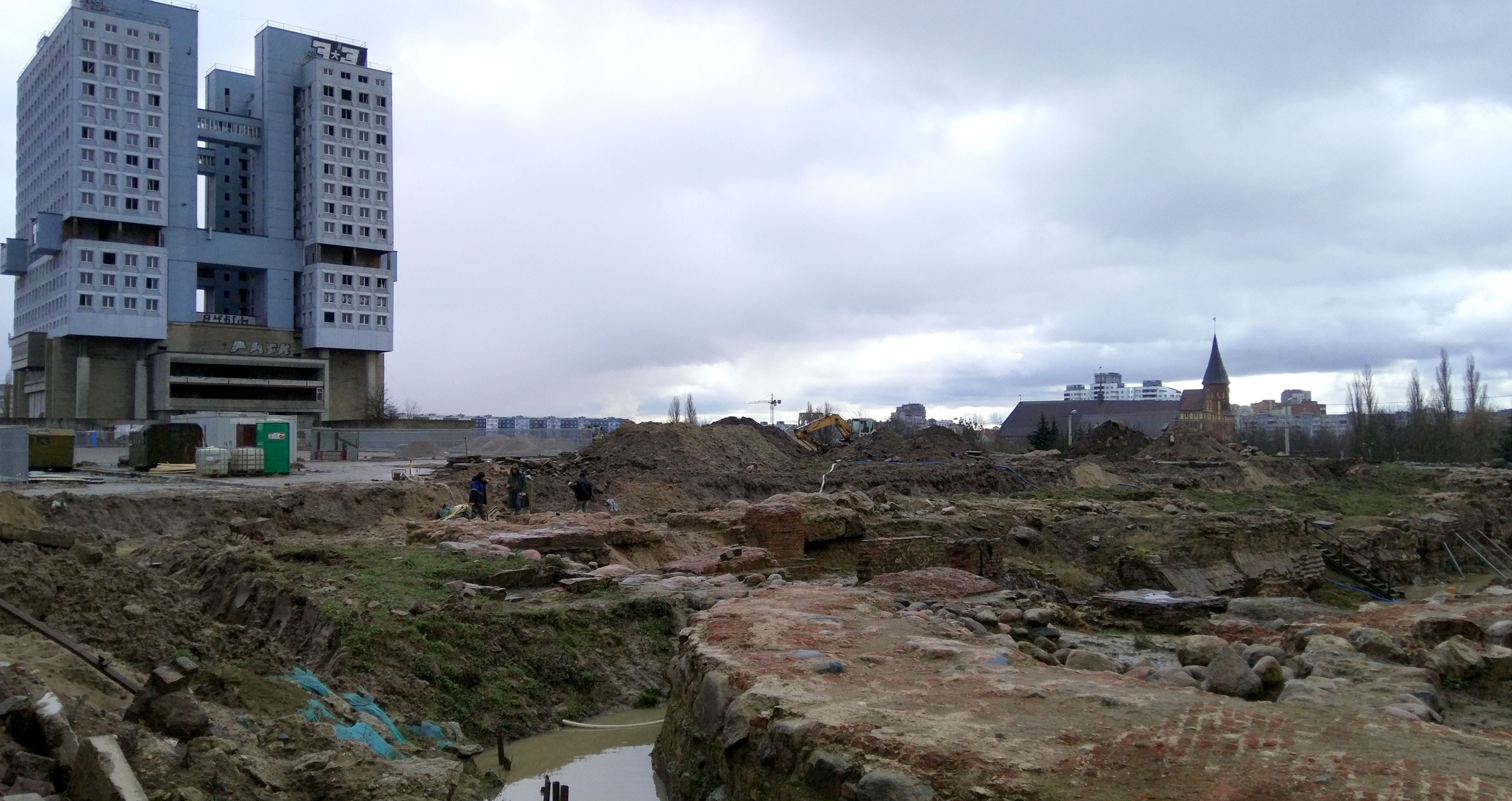
Excavation of the Königsberg Castle ruins in 2018

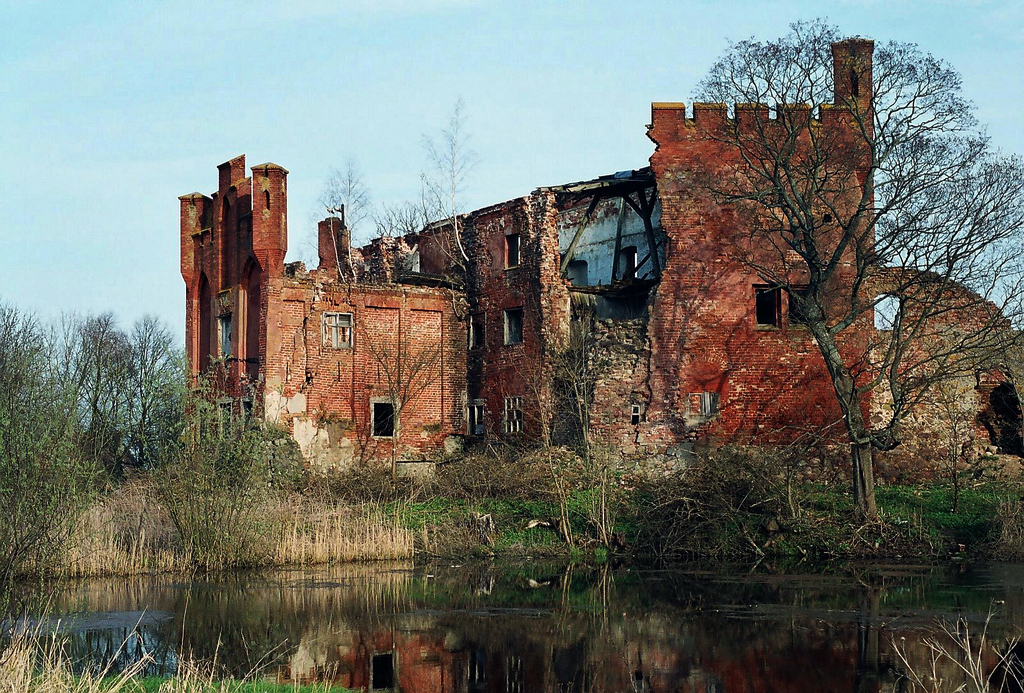
Schaaken Castle ruins

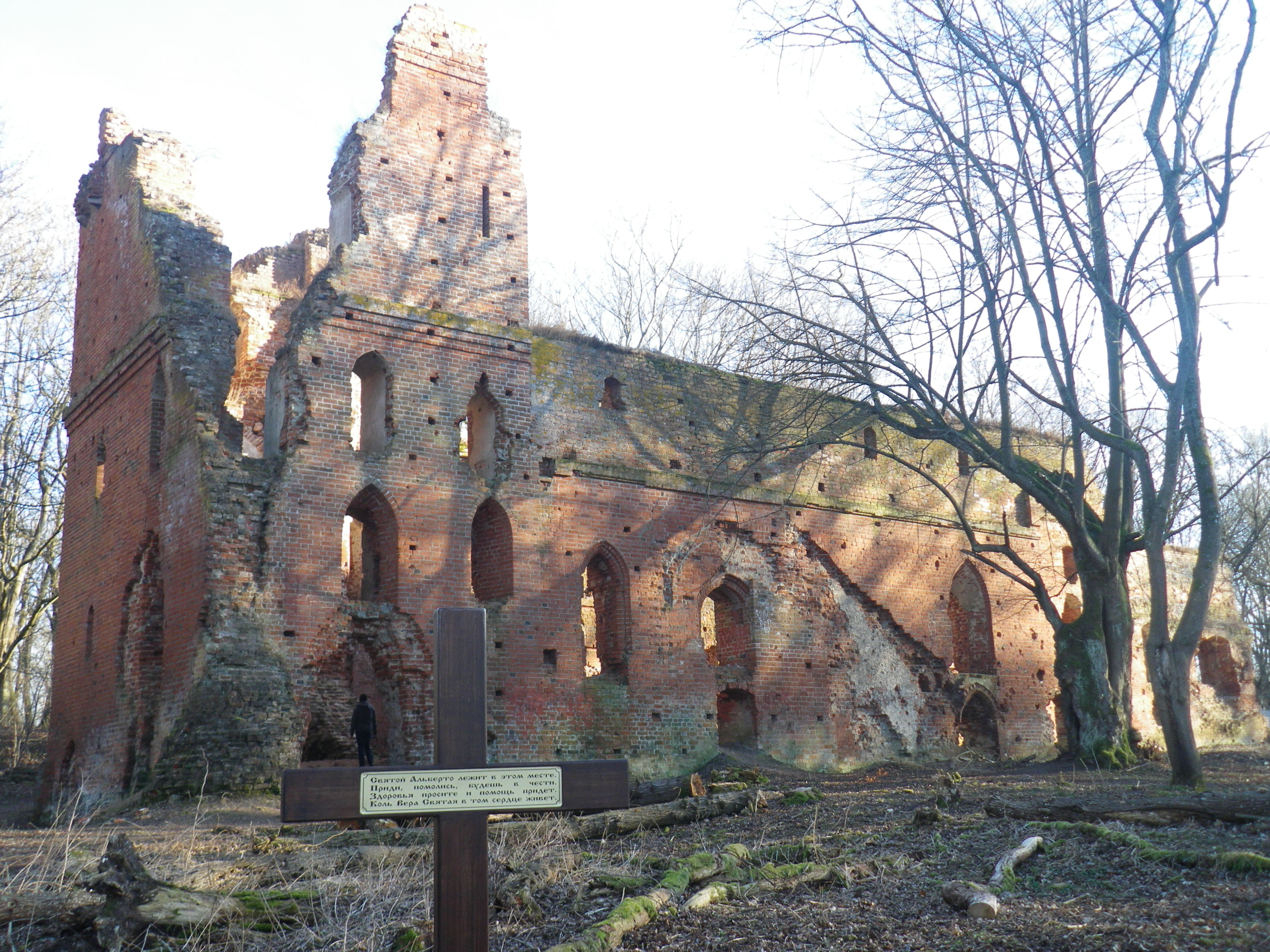
Balga castle ruins

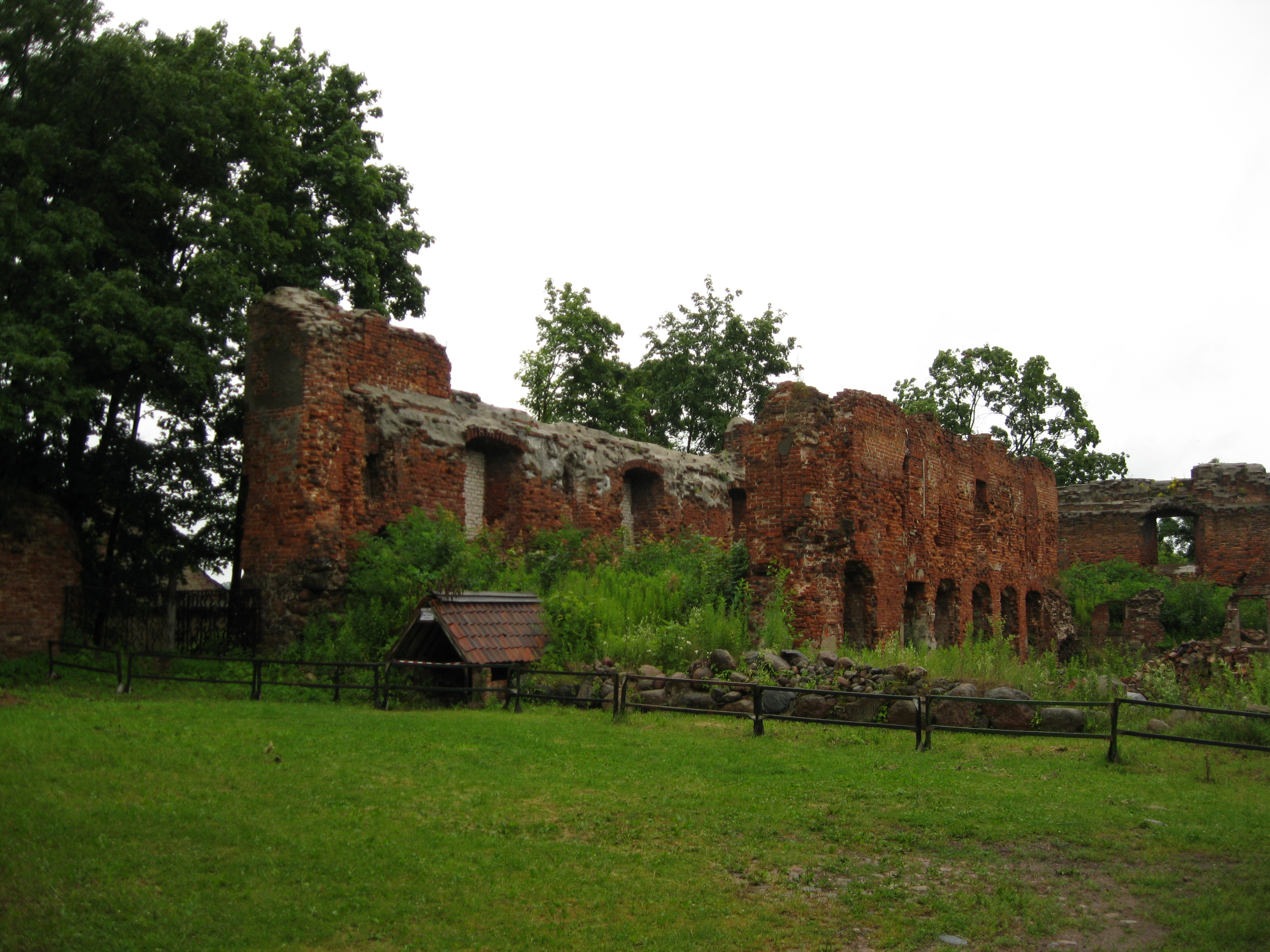
Insterburg Castle ruins

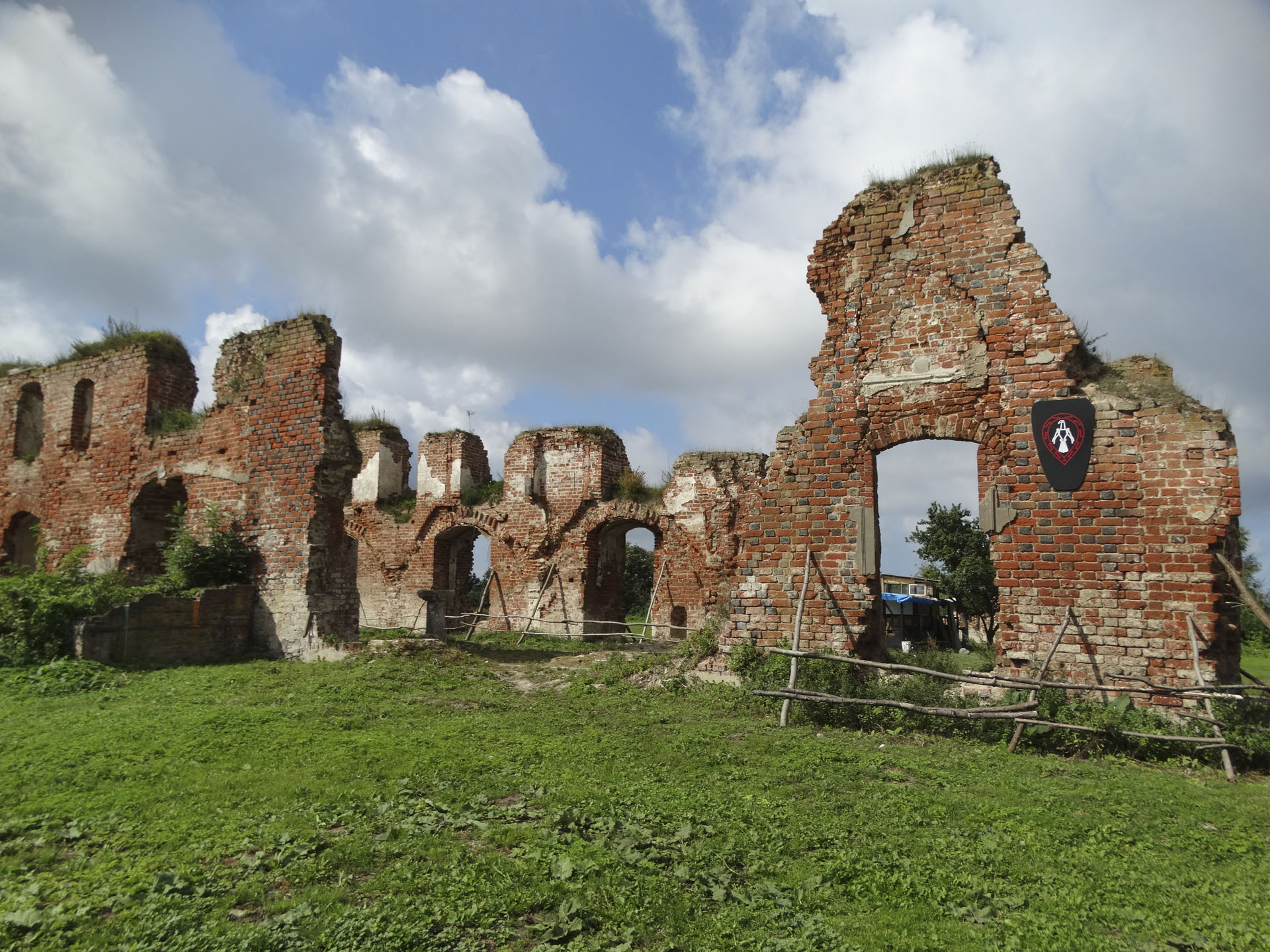
Brandenburg Castle ruins

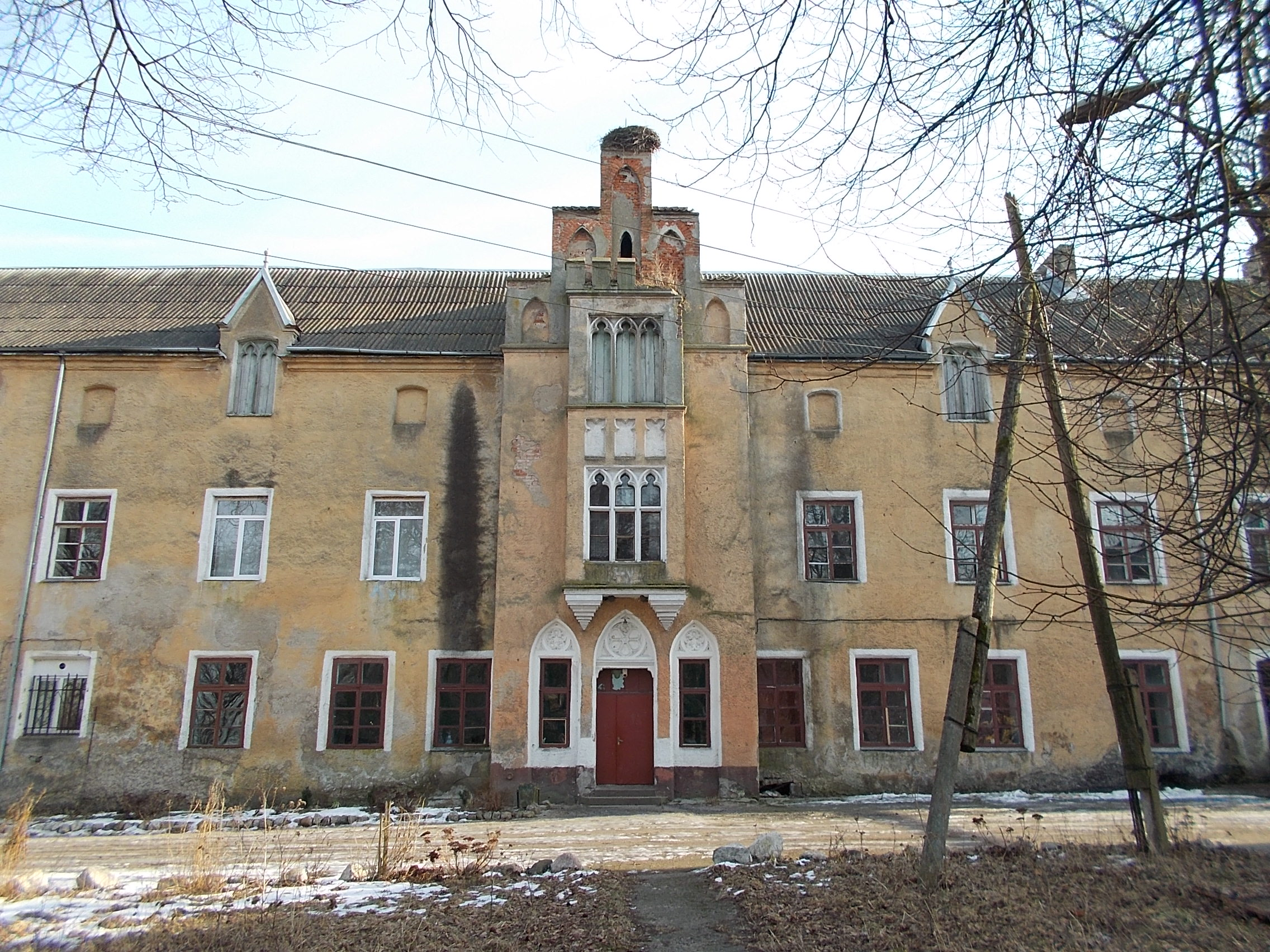
Waldau Castle

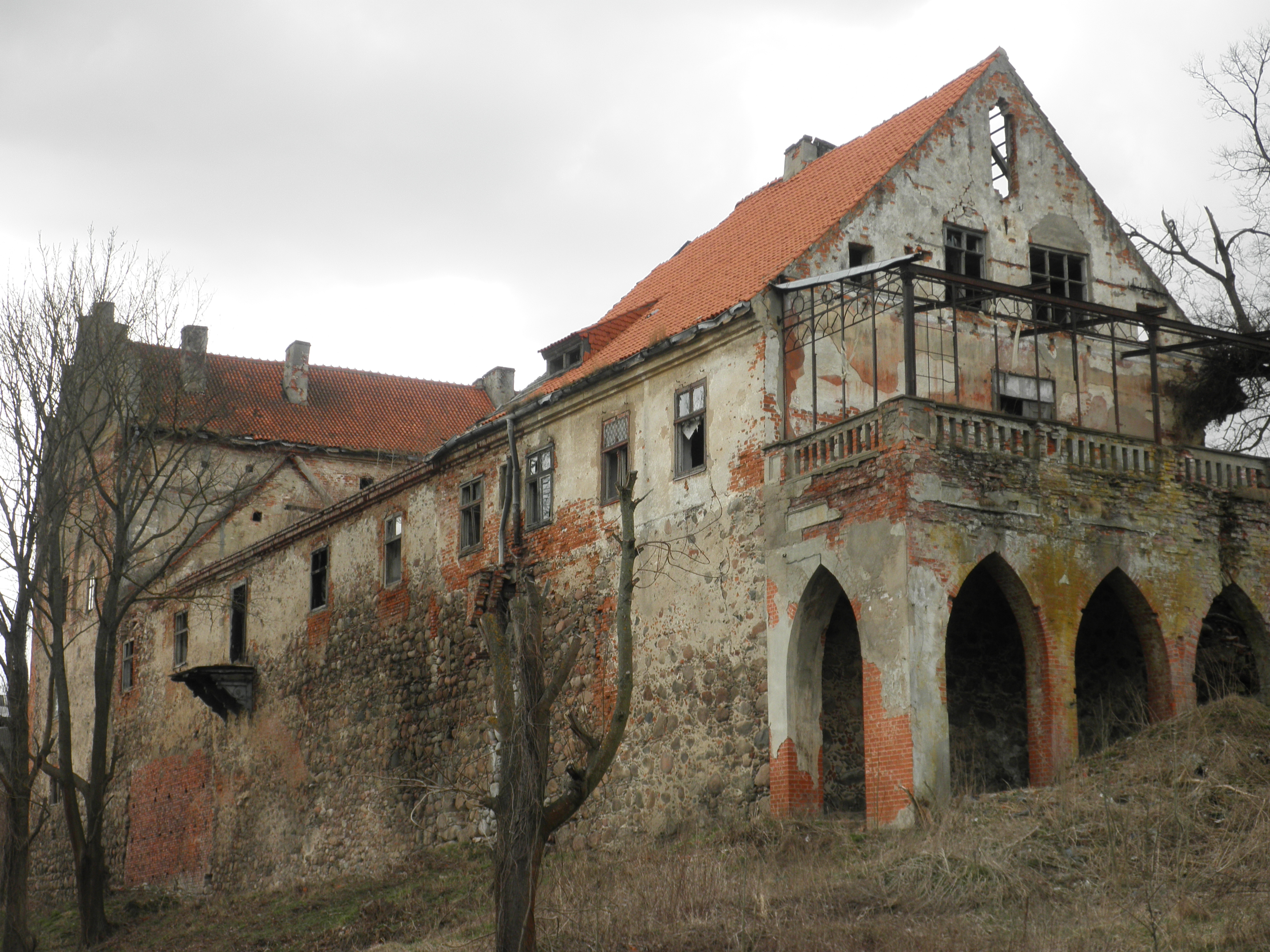
Georgenburg Castle

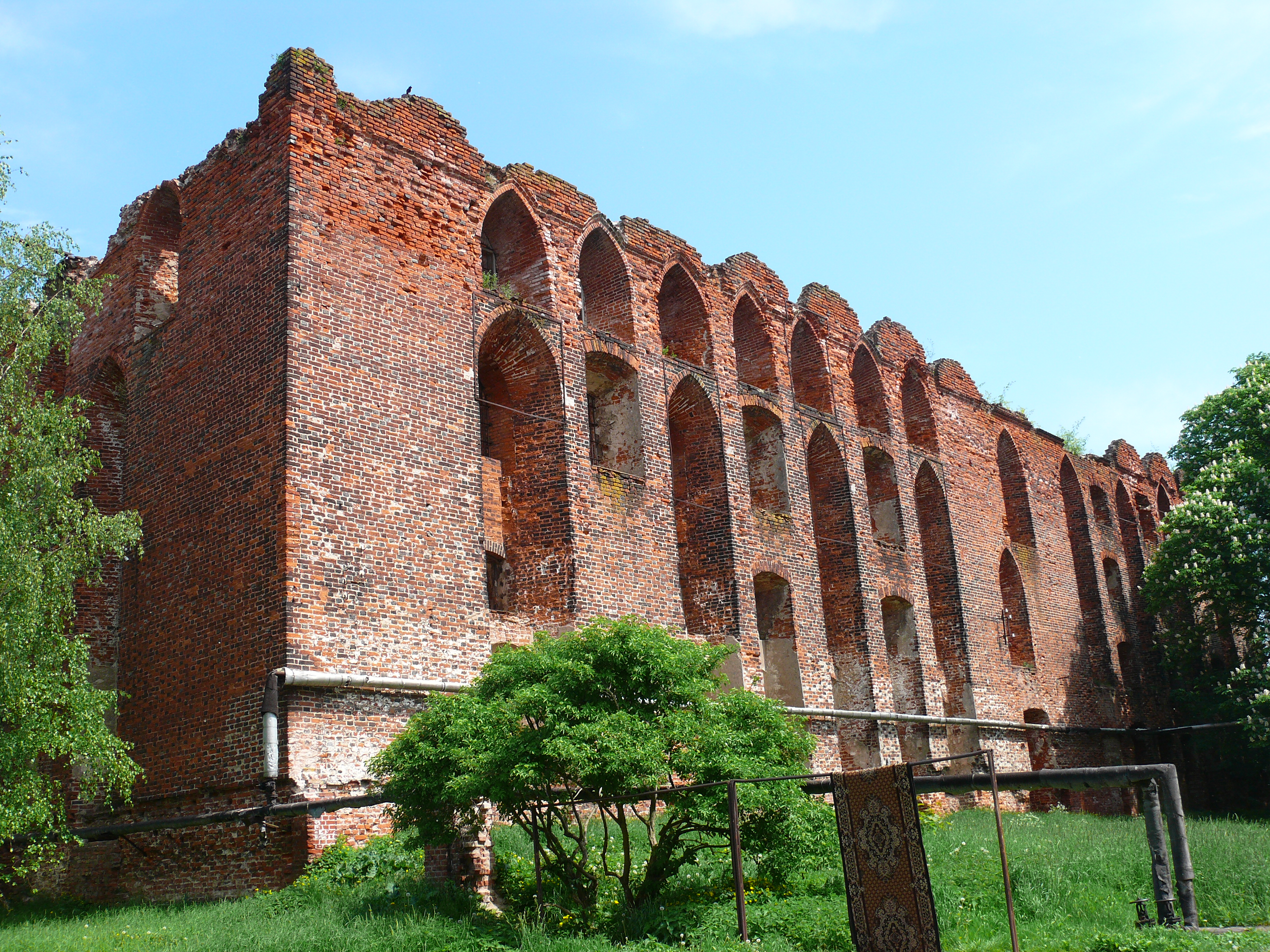
Ragnit Castle ruins

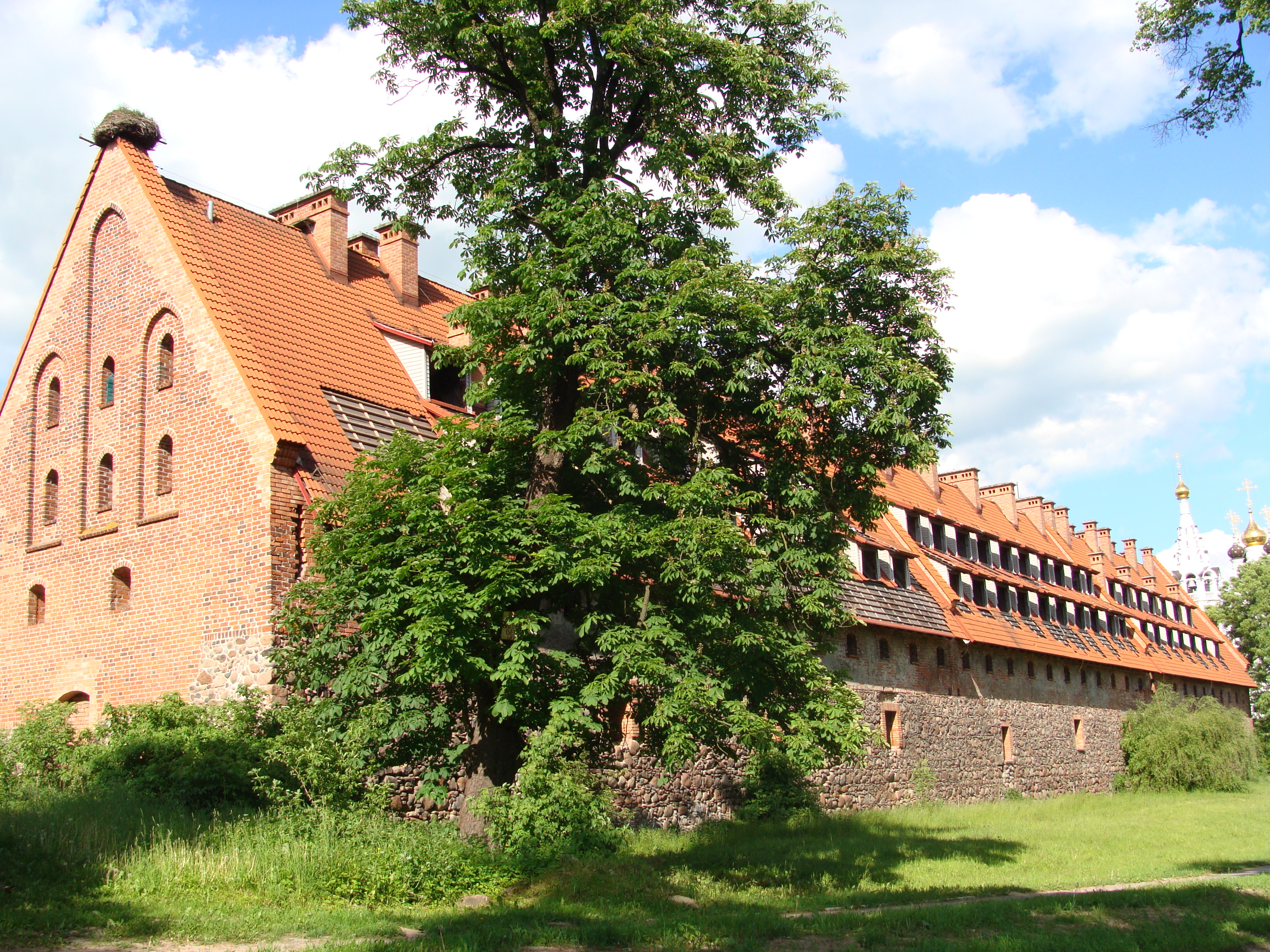
Preußisch Eylau Castle

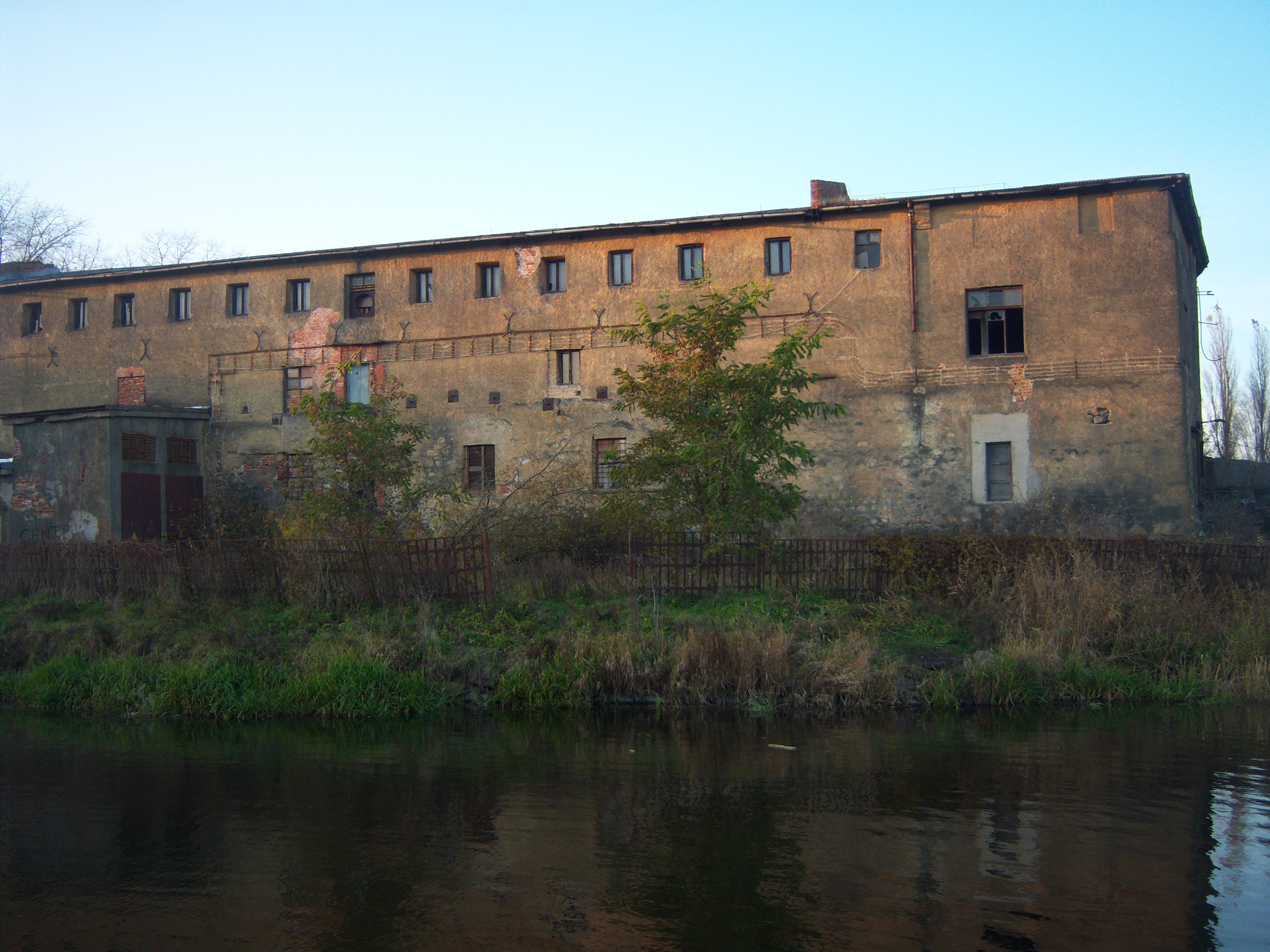
Labiau Castle

=== City gates ===
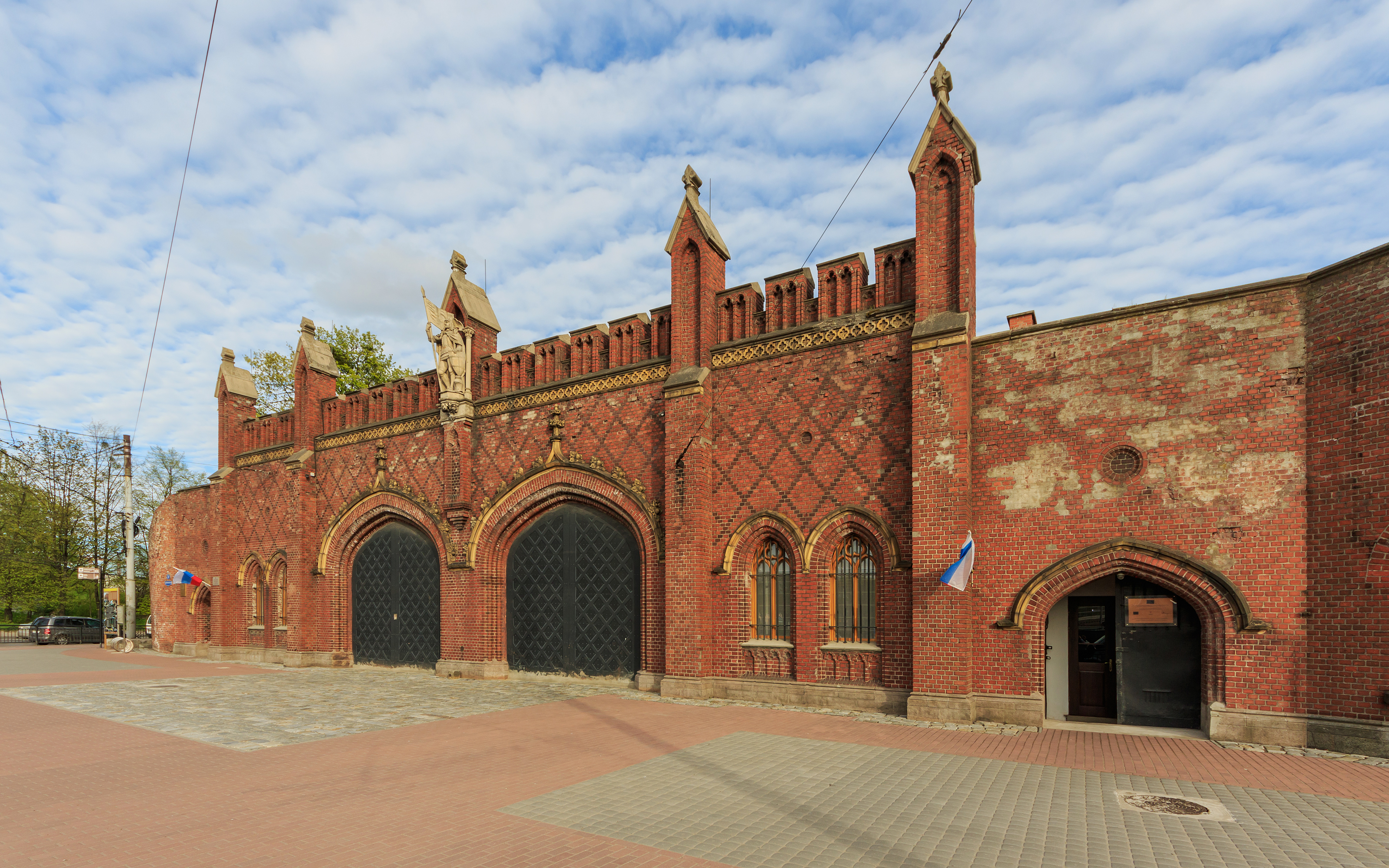
Friedland Gate in Kaliningrad

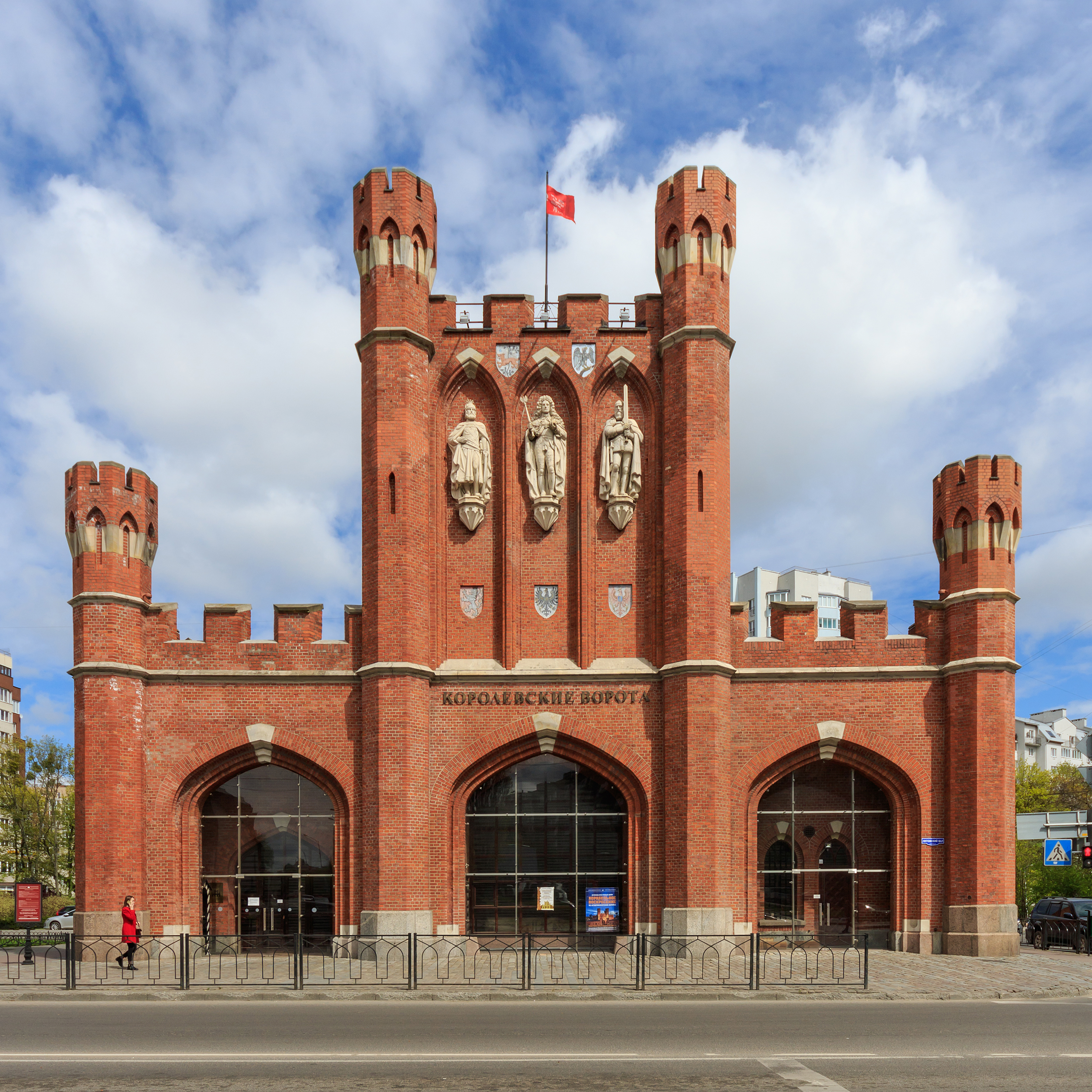
King's Gate

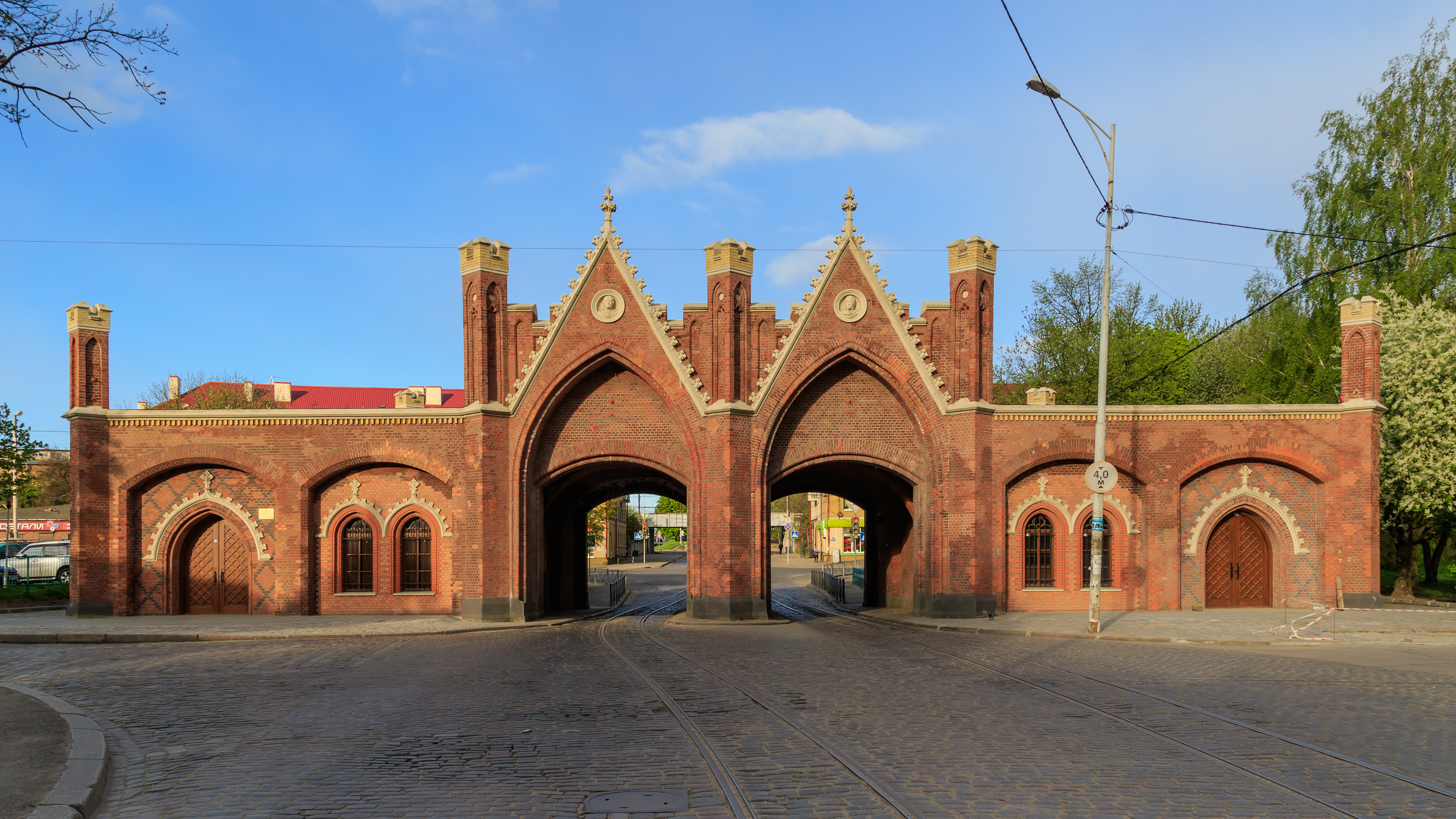
Brandenburg Gate

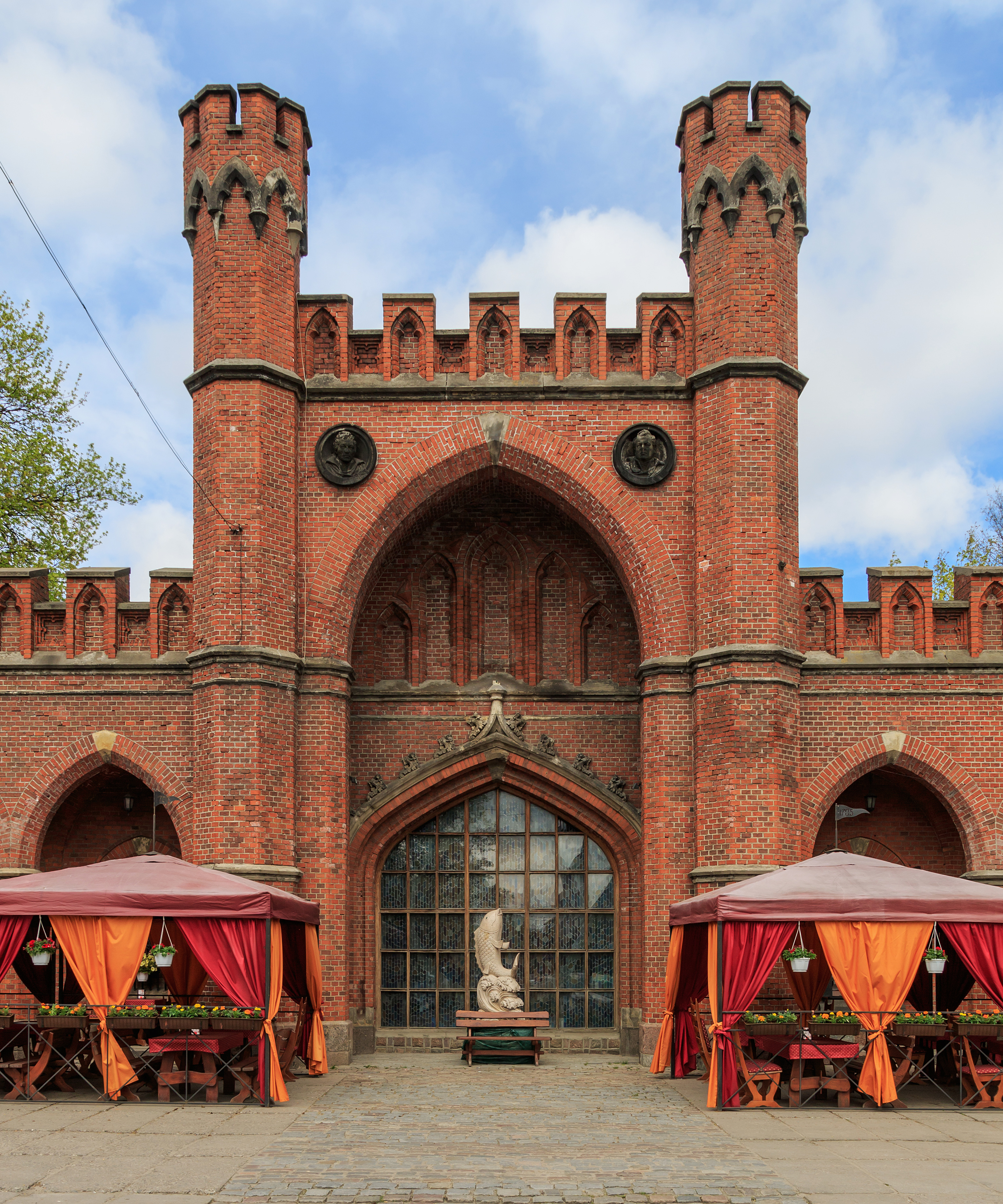
Rossgarten Gate

=== Religious buildings ===
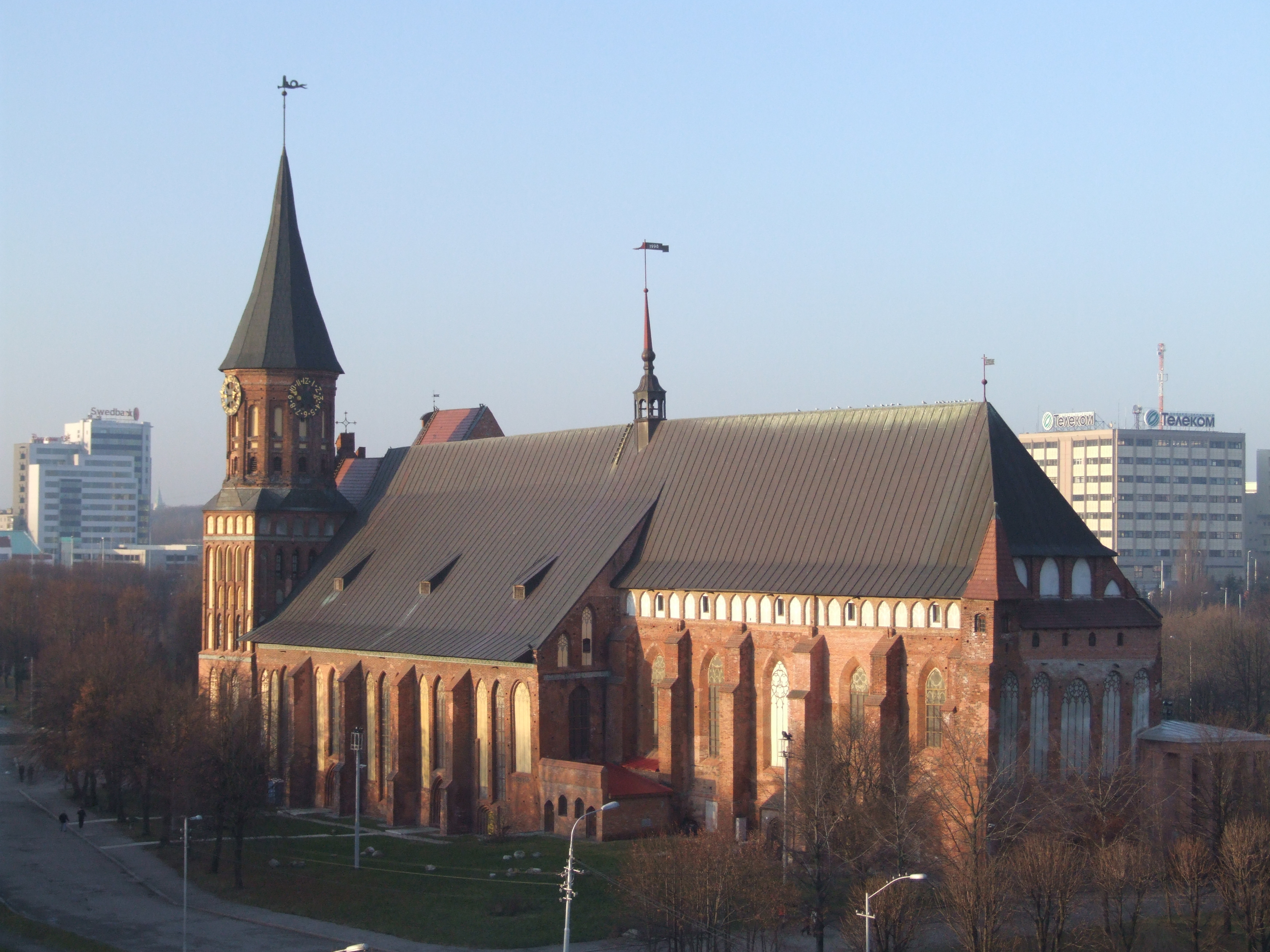
Königsberg Cathedral

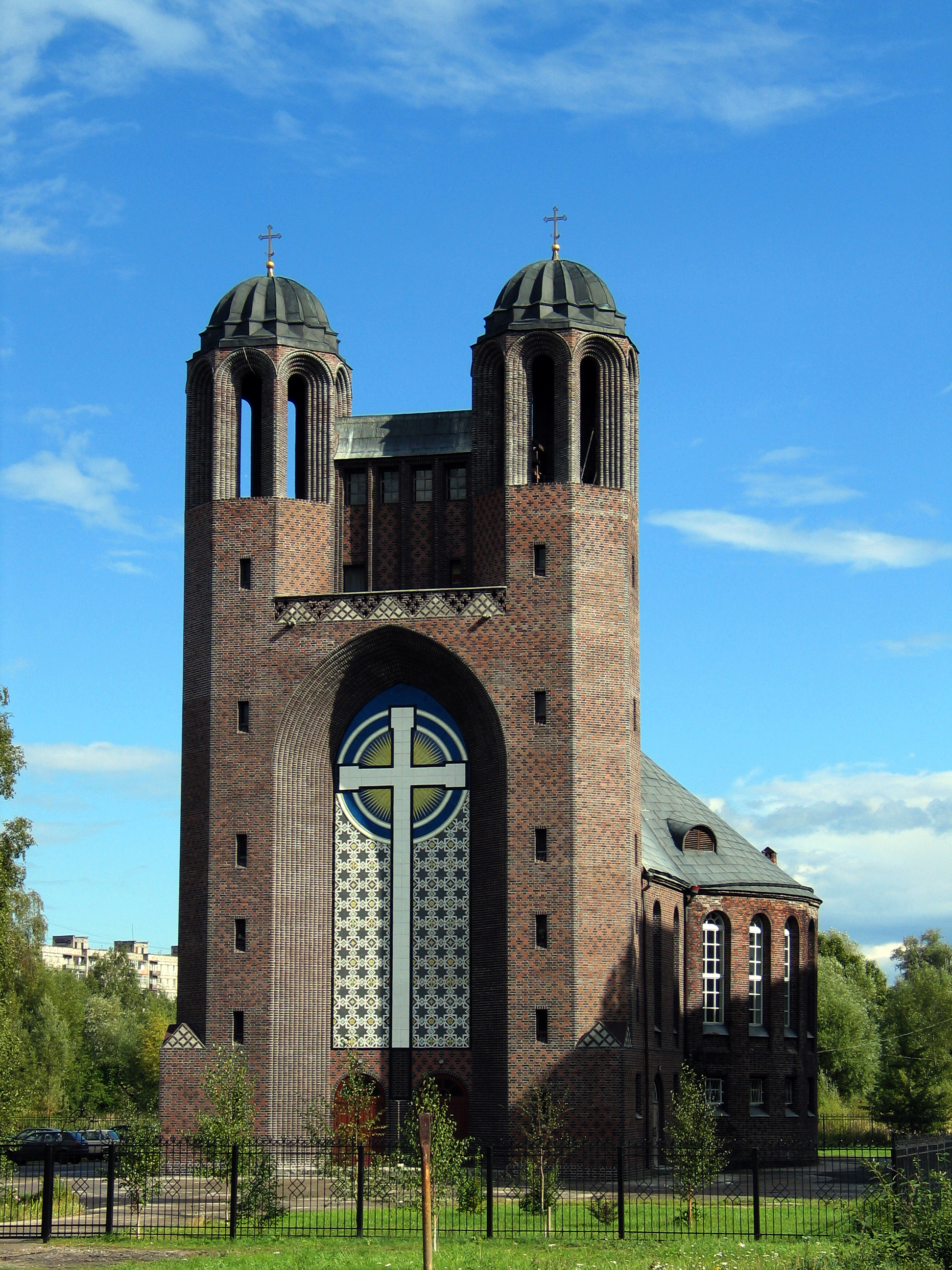
Kreuzkirche

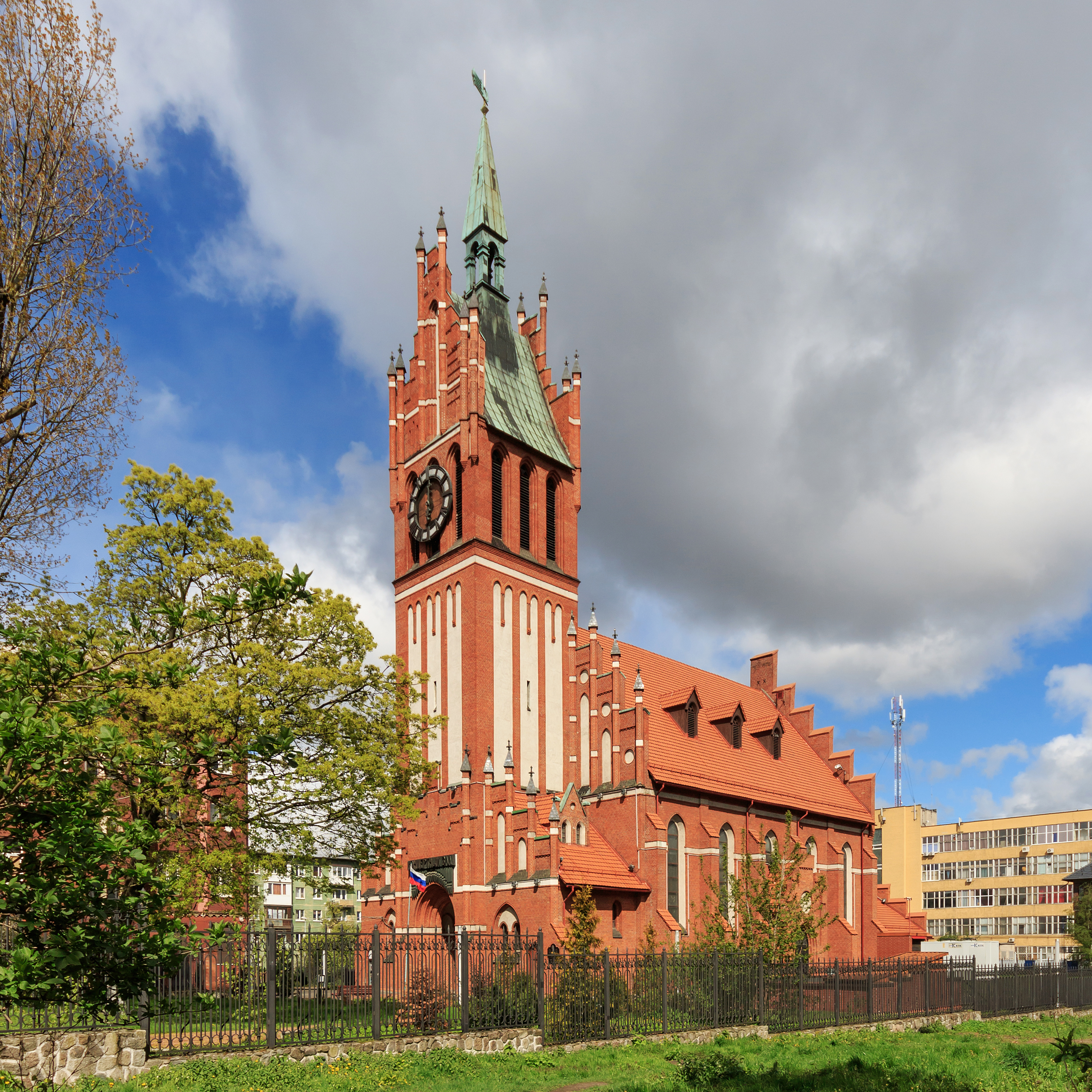
Church of the Holy Family

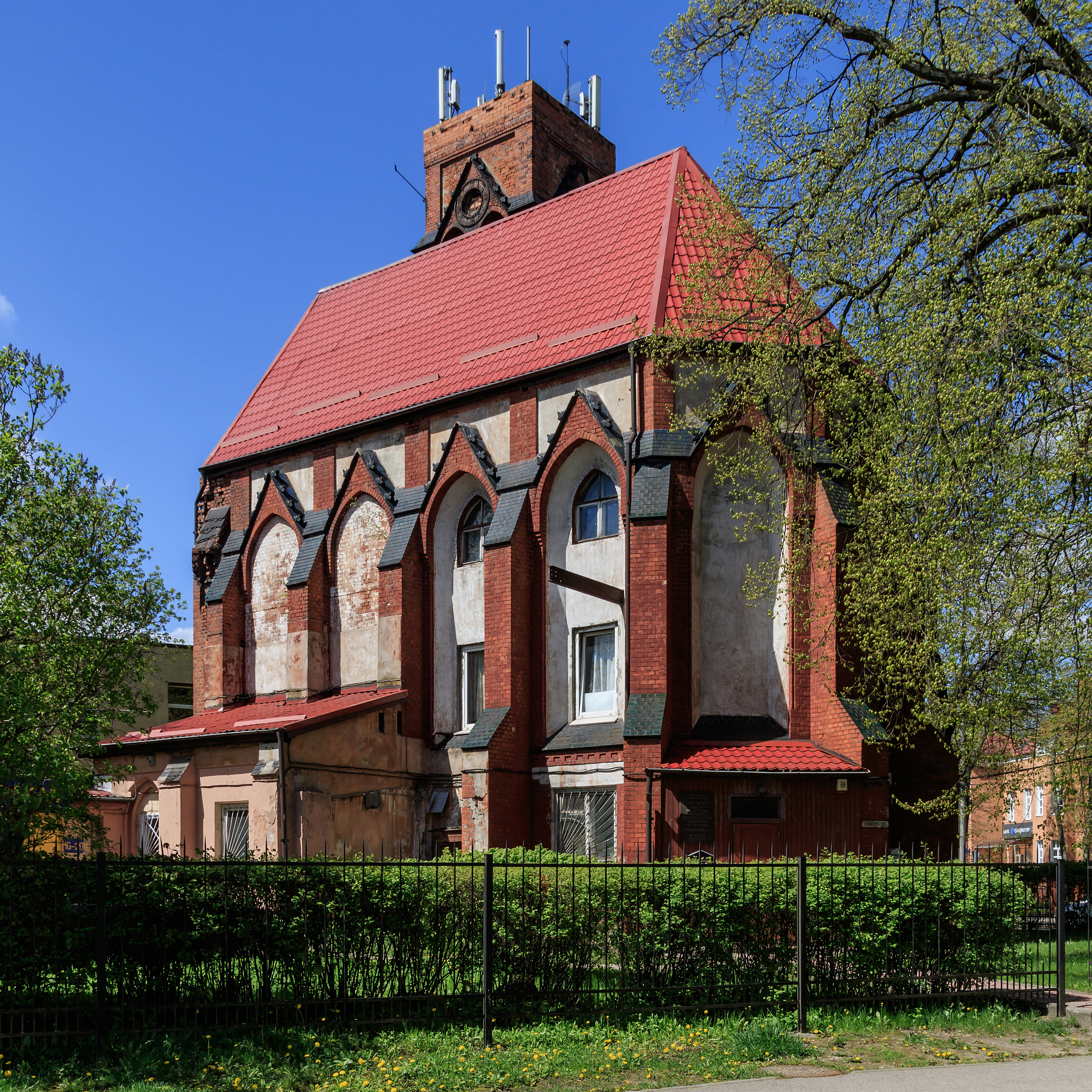
Former St. Adalbert's Church

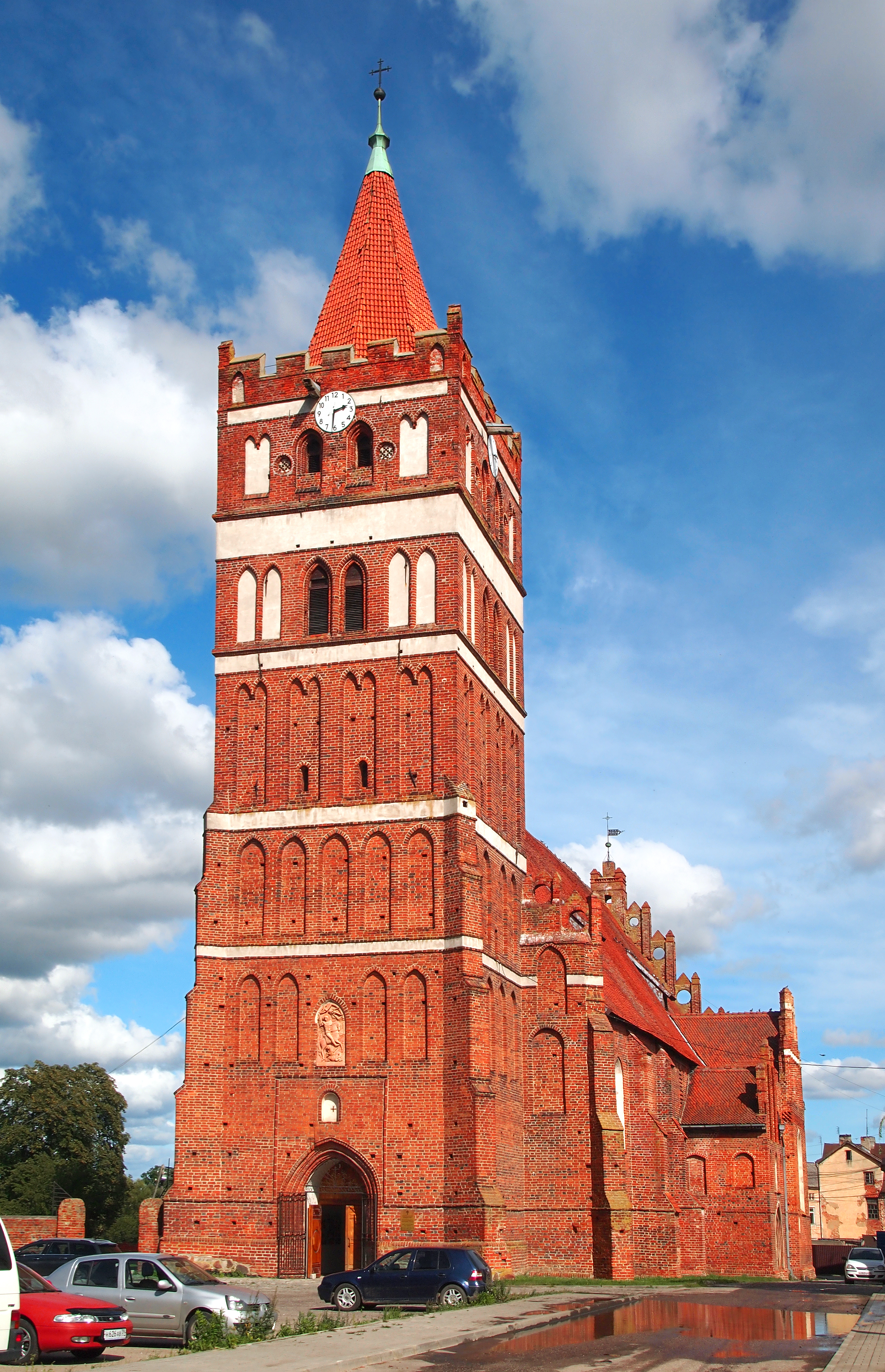
Saint George church, Pravdinsk

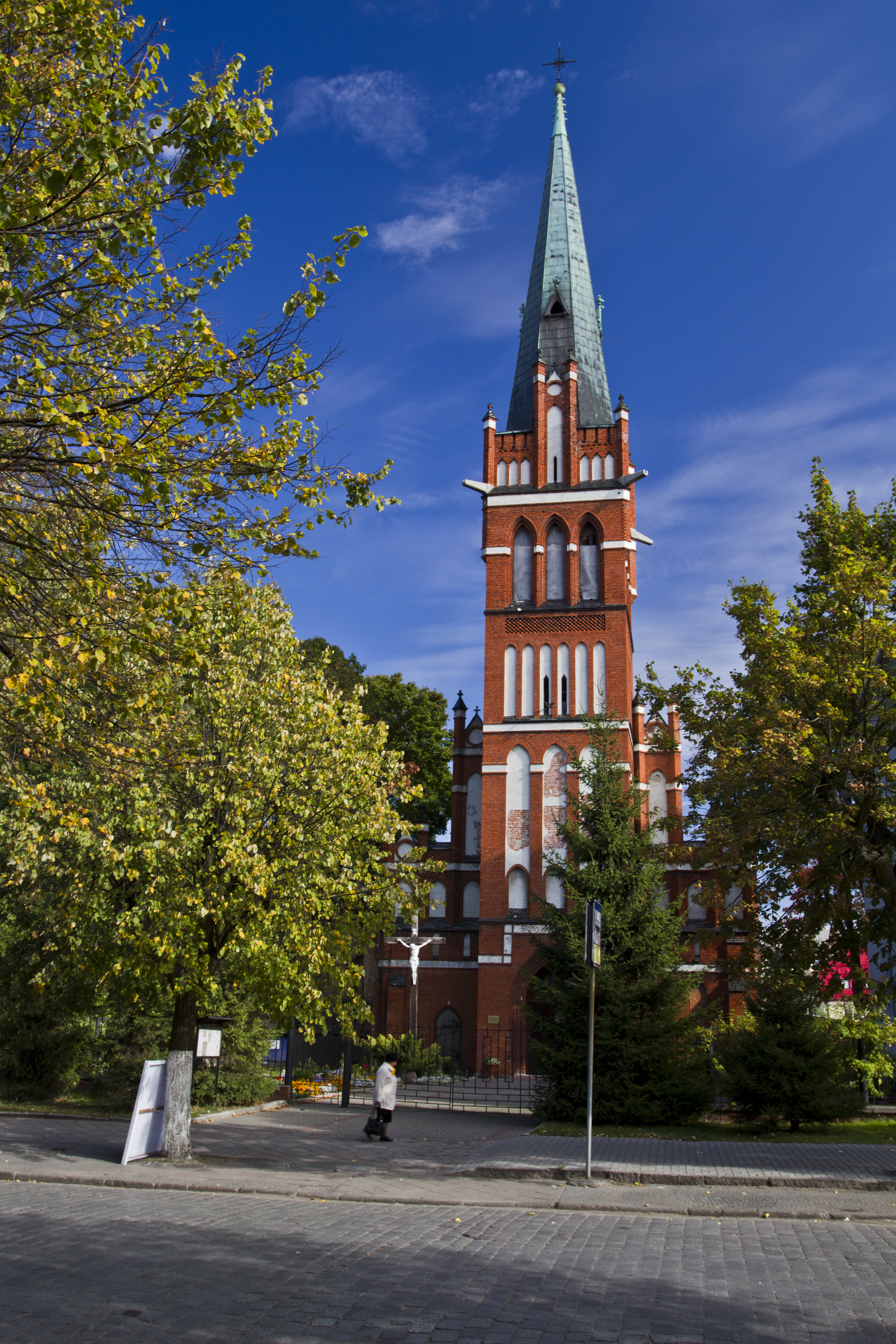
Saint Bruno Church, Chernyakhovsk

=== Forts ===
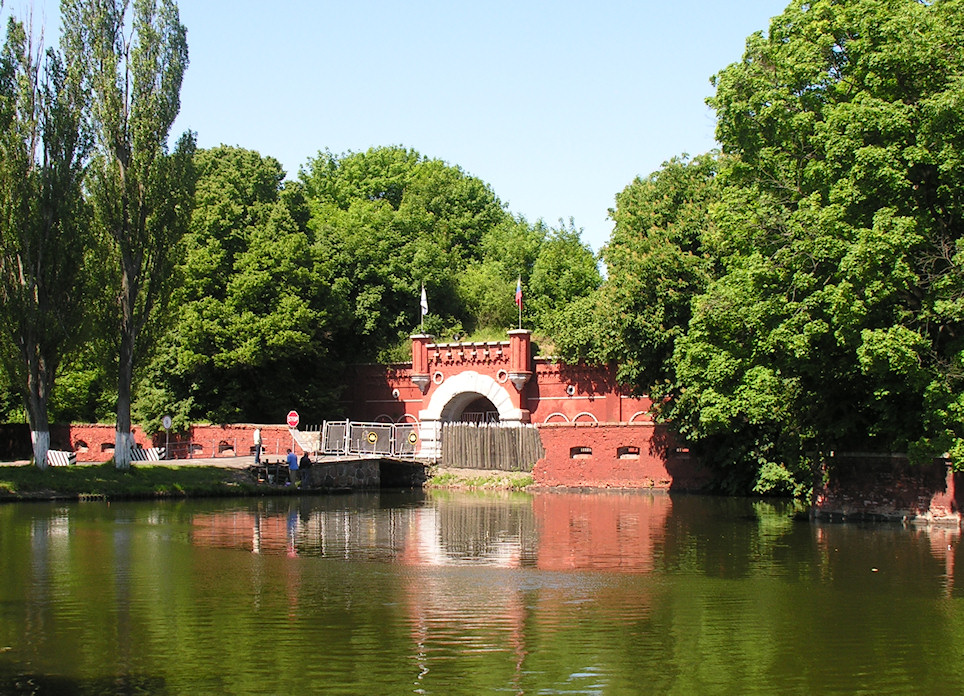
Pillau Fortress

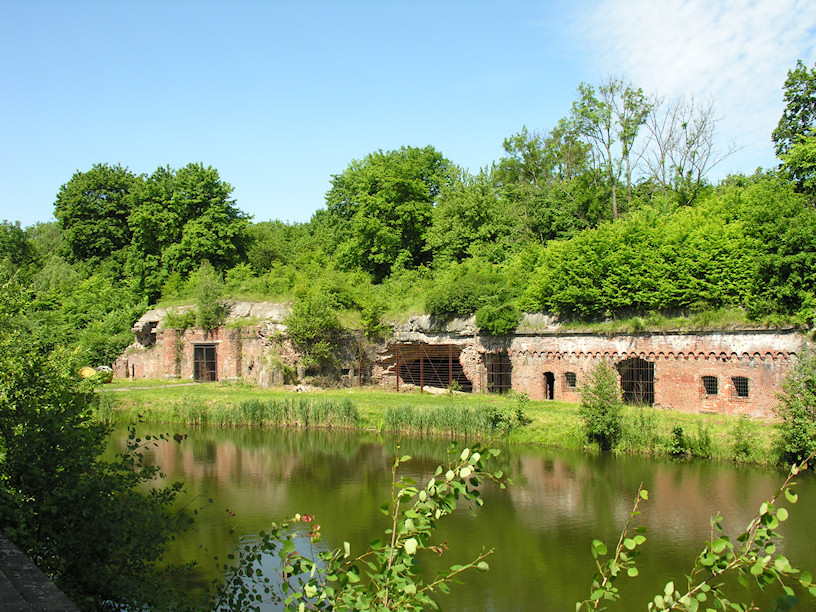
Fort V "Friedrich Wilhelm III"

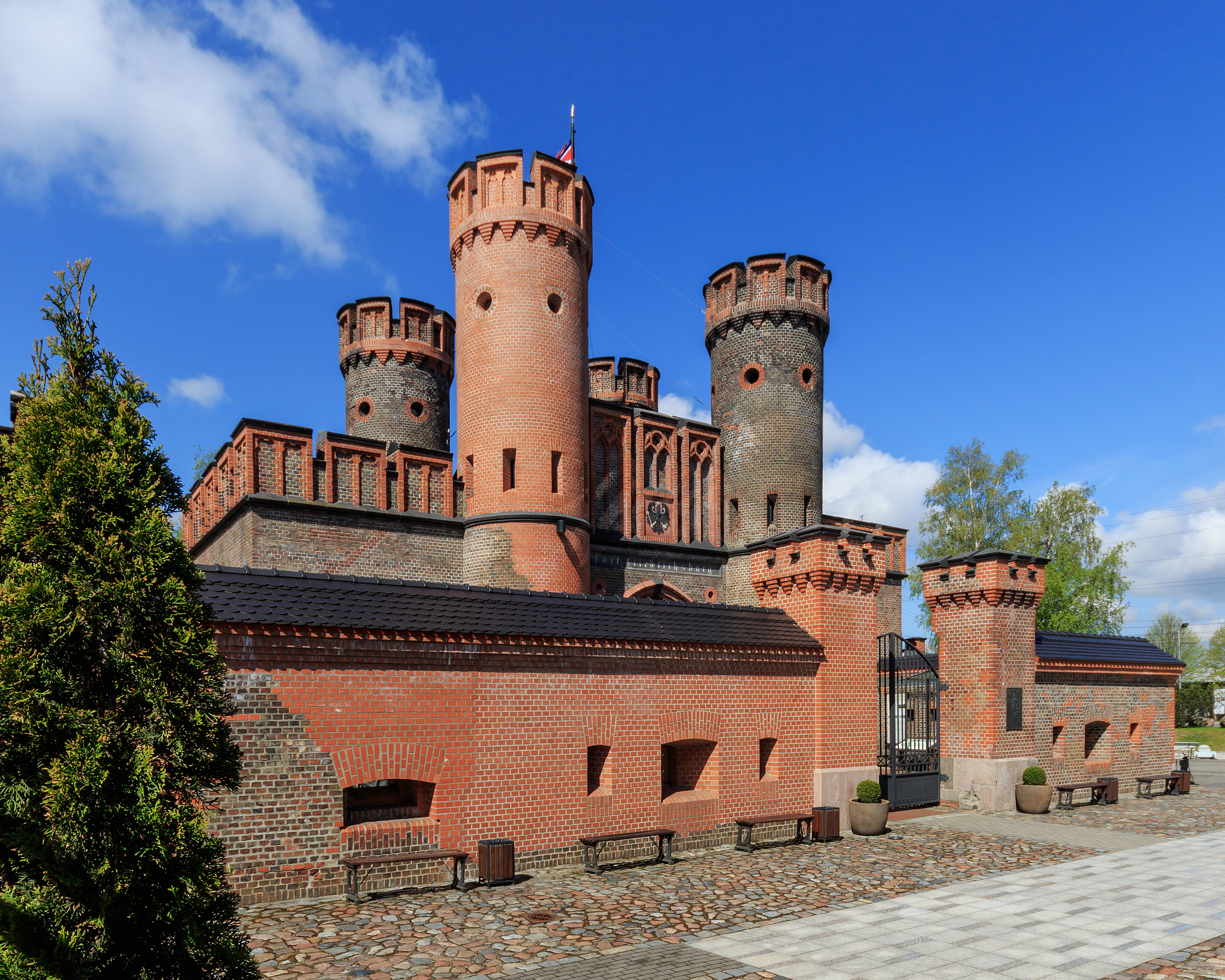
Fort Friedrichsburg

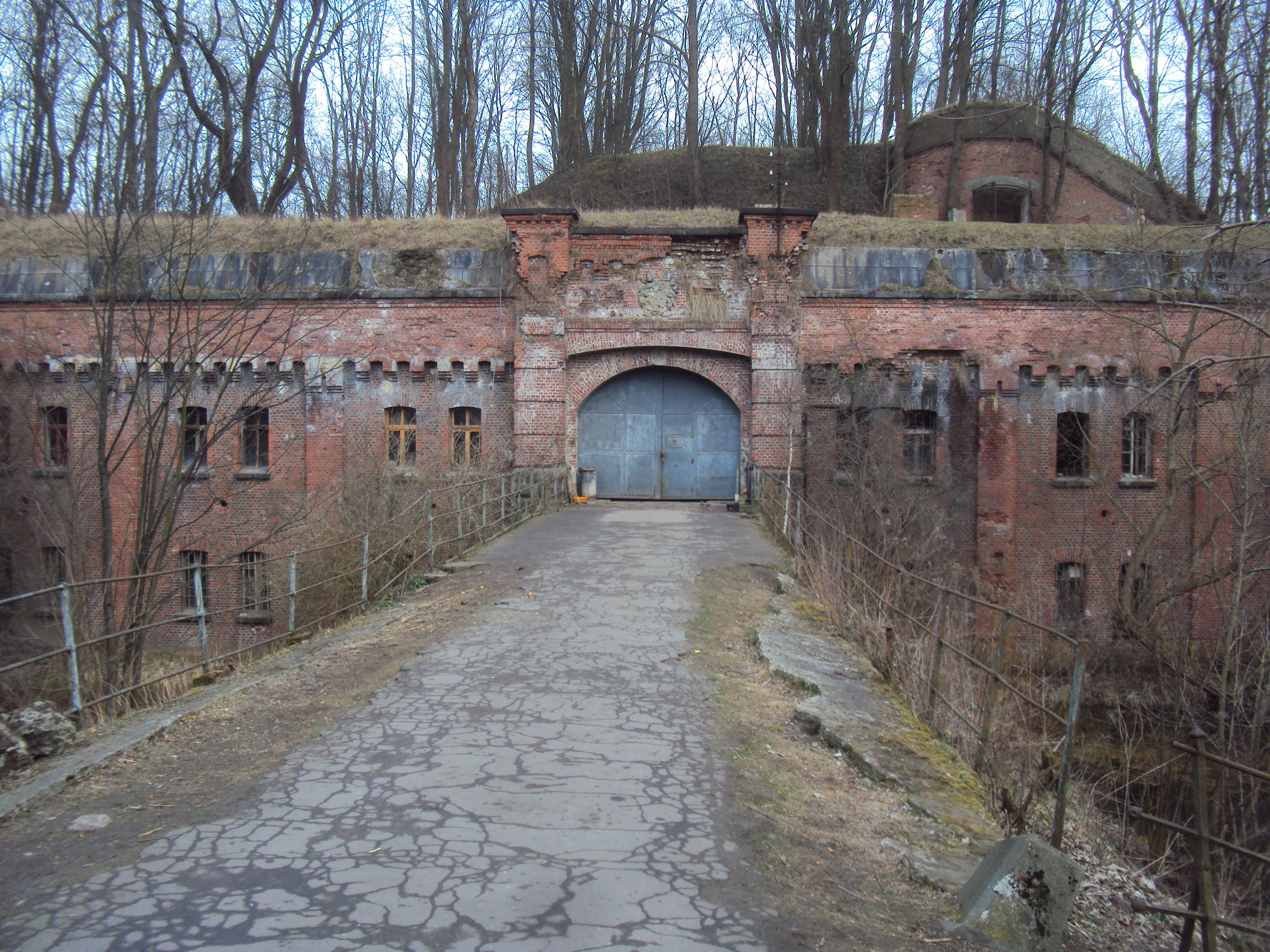
Fort No.1 Stein am Lauther Muhlenteich

=== Other pre-war sights ===
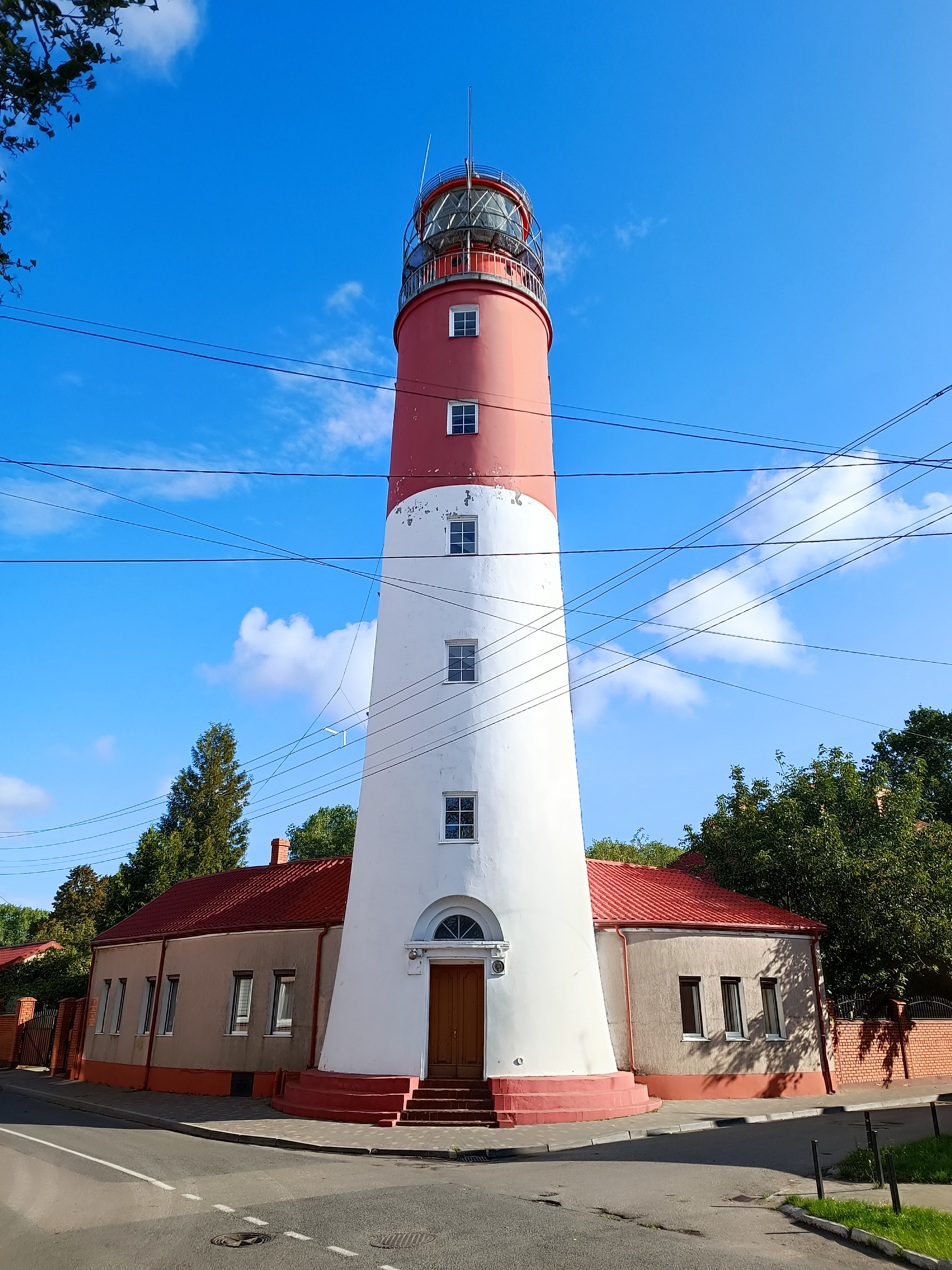
Baltiysk Lighthouse

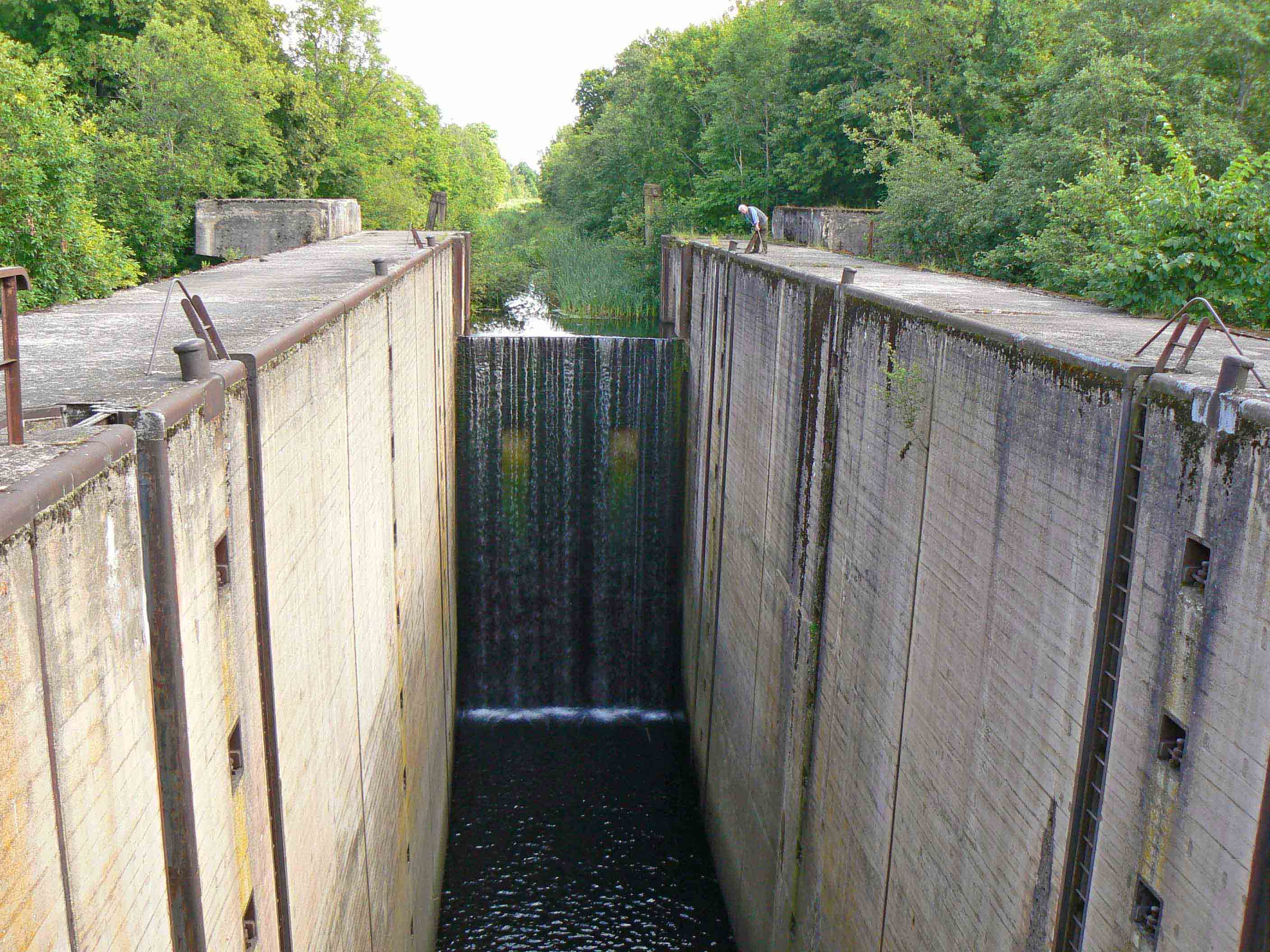
Ozerki Lock, Masurian Canal

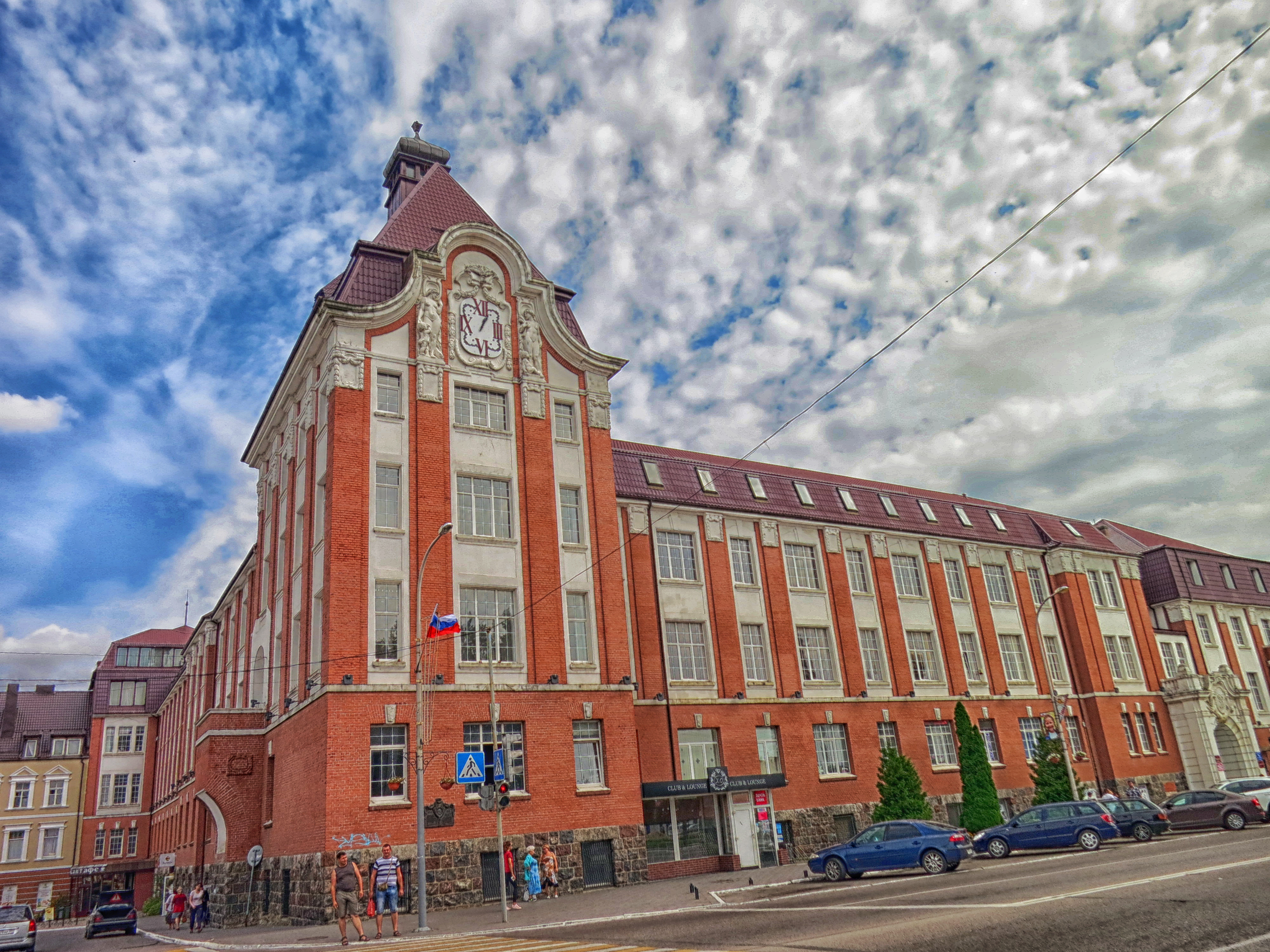
Administration building in Gusev

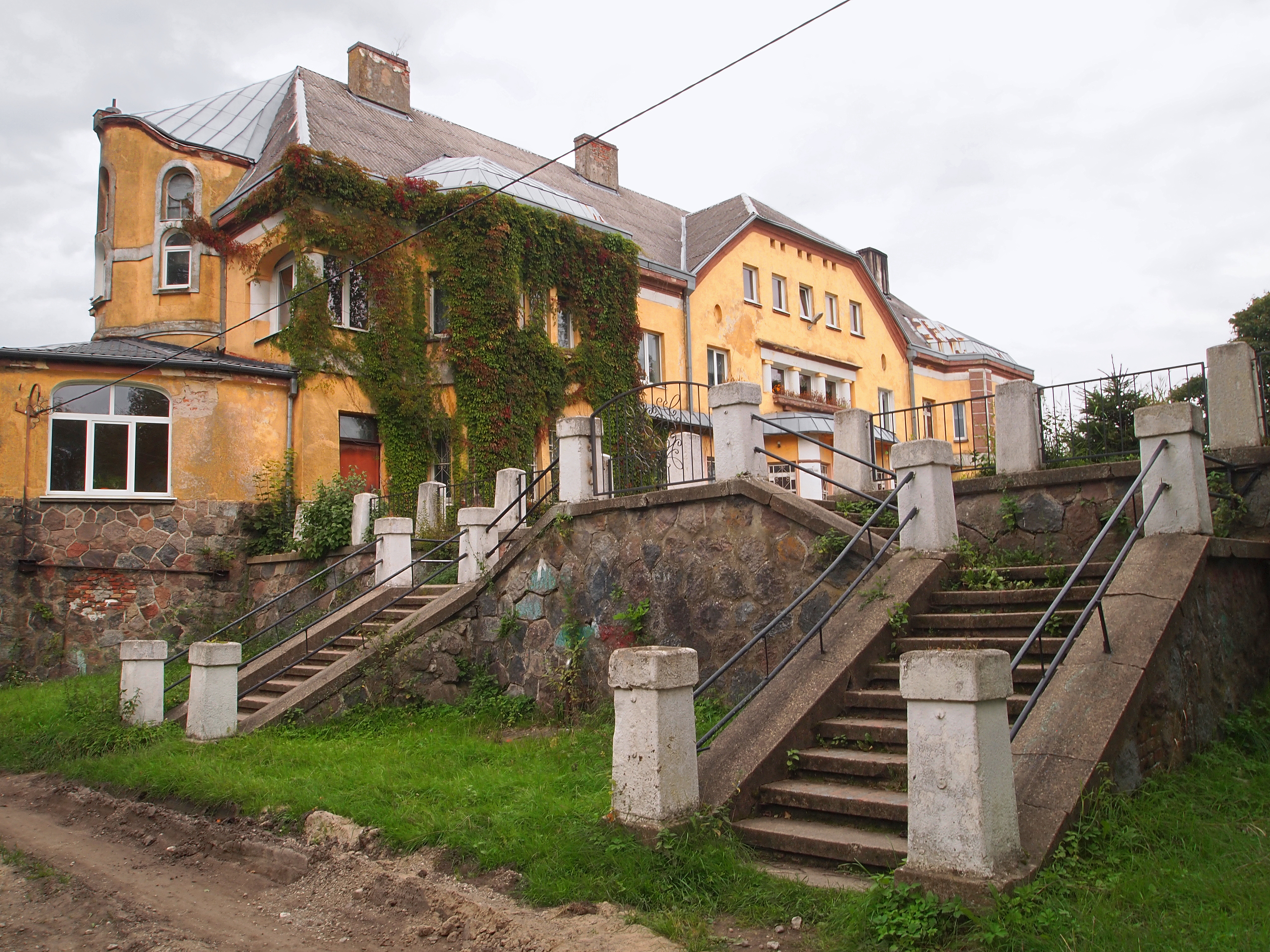
Palace in Saranskoe

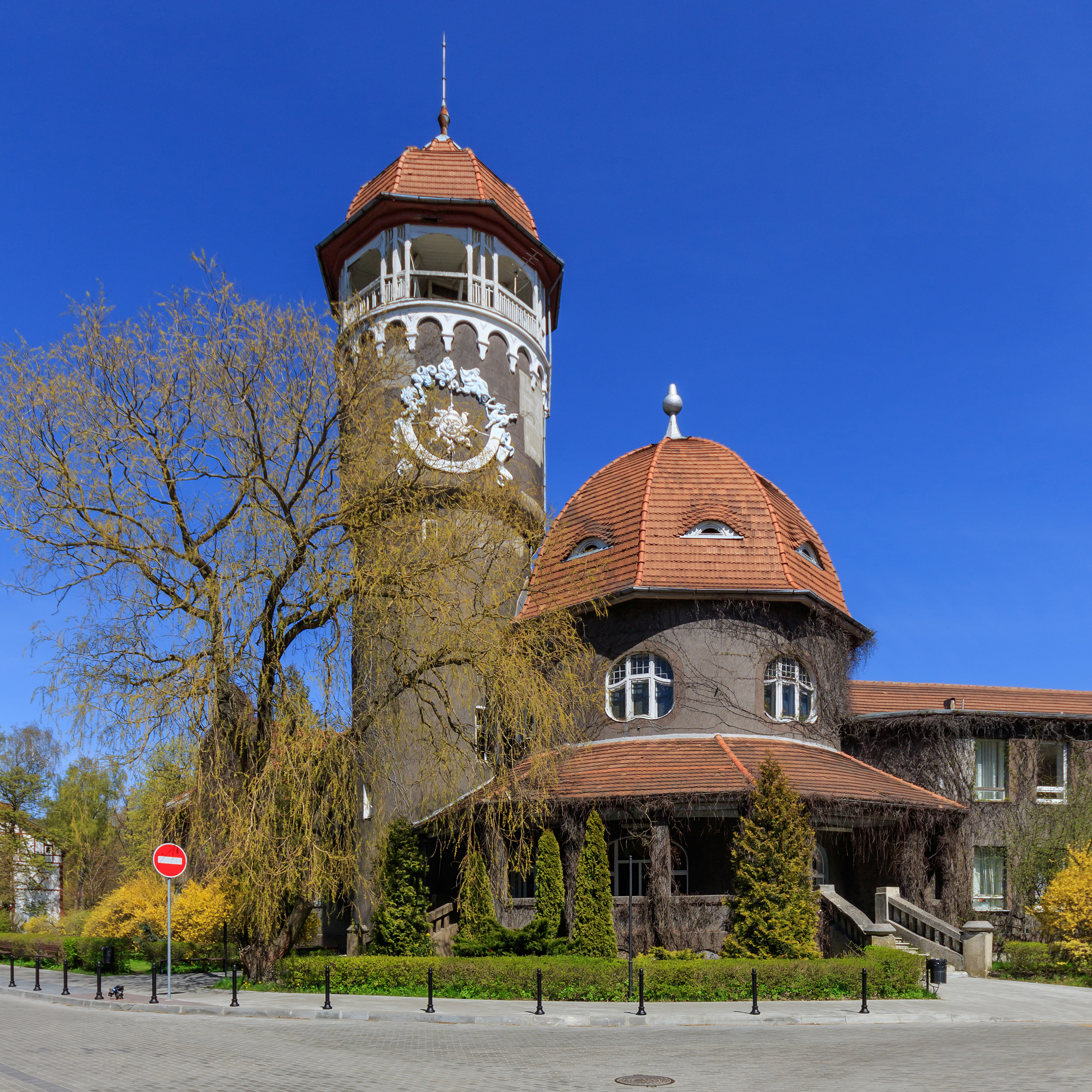
Water Tower, Svetlogorsk

=== Postwar heritage ===
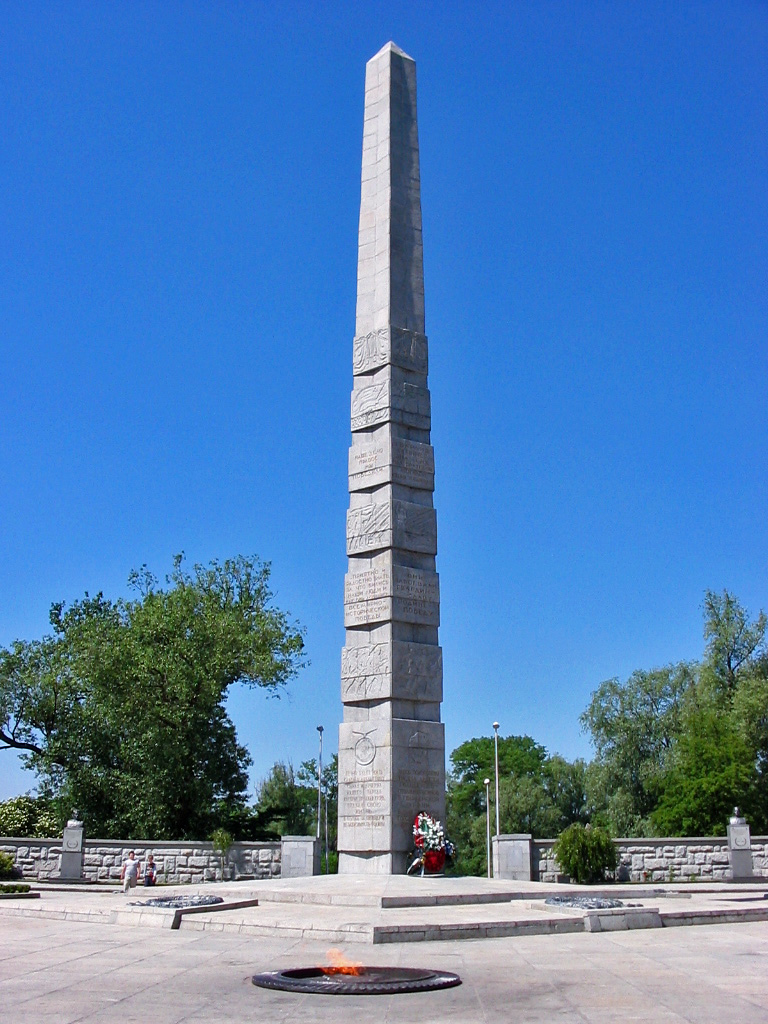
Monument to the 1200 Guardsmen

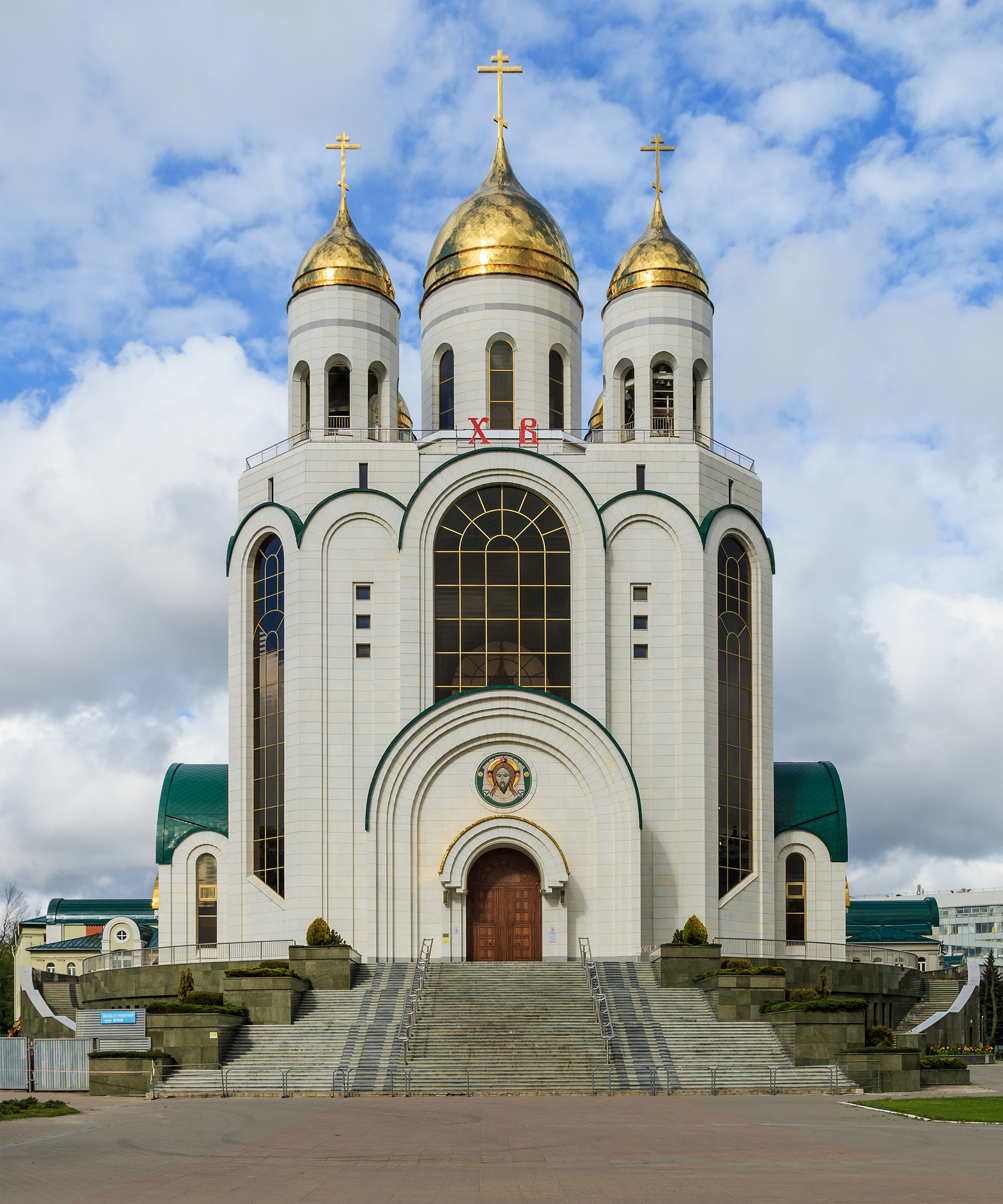
Cathedral of Christ the Saviour

== See also ==
- Heart of the City (Kaliningrad)
- Königsberg fortifications
