= Veselovka =

Veselovka Веселовка
- Village
- Location within Bashkortostan Location within Russia
- Coordinates: 54°03′N 56°09′E
- Country: Russia
- Region: Bashkortostan
- District: Aurgazinsky District
- Time zone: UTC+5:00

Veselovka (Russian: Веселовка) is a rural locality (a village) in Tryapinsky Selsoviet, Aurgazinsky District, Bashkortostan, Russia. The population was 77 as of 2010. There are 2 streets.

== Geography ==
Veselovka is located 24 km east of Tolbazy (the district's administrative centre) by road. Tolmachevka is the nearest rural locality.
