= Pushkino, Nesterovsky District =

Settlement in Kaliningrad Oblast

Pushkino Пушкино
- Rural locality
- Interactive map of Pushkino
- Location of Pushkino Pushkino (European Russia) Pushkino (Russia)
- Coordinates: 54°36′N 22°36′E
- Country: Russia
- Federal subject: Kaliningrad Oblast

Population
  - Estimate (2021): 375 )
- Time zone: UTC+2 (MSK–1)
- Postal code: 238026
- OKTMO ID: 27624404161

Pushkino (Russian: Пушкино, Lithuanian: Gėritai, German: Göritten) is a rural settlement in Nesterovsky District of Kaliningrad Oblast, Russia. It is located in the historic region of Lithuania Minor.

There are ruins of a former Calvinist church in the village, first built in 1725, then rebuilt in 1923–1925 after partial destruction in World War I. From 1832 to 1907, Lithuanian services were held at the church.
