= Kazachye, Kaliningrad Oblast =

Former settlement in Kaliningrad Oblast

Kazachye Загорское
- Rural locality
- Interactive map of Kazachye
- Location of Kazachye Kazachye (European Russia) Kazachye (Russia)
- Coordinates: 54°20′2″N 21°44′52″E
- Country: Russia
- Federal subject: Kaliningrad Oblast
- Administrative district: Ozyorsky District

Kazachye (Russian: Казачье; Polish: Piątki) is an abandoned village in the Ozyorsky District of Kaliningrad Oblast, Russia, on the border with Poland.

== History ==
The village was founded by Polish people. There was a brickyard, windmill and steam distillery in the village in the late 19th century. Under Nazi Germany, the village was renamed Waldkerme to erase traces of Polish origin. The village was abandoned in 1976.
