= Roshchino, Zelenogradsky District =

Settlement in Kaliningrad Oblast

Roshchino Рощино
- Rural locality
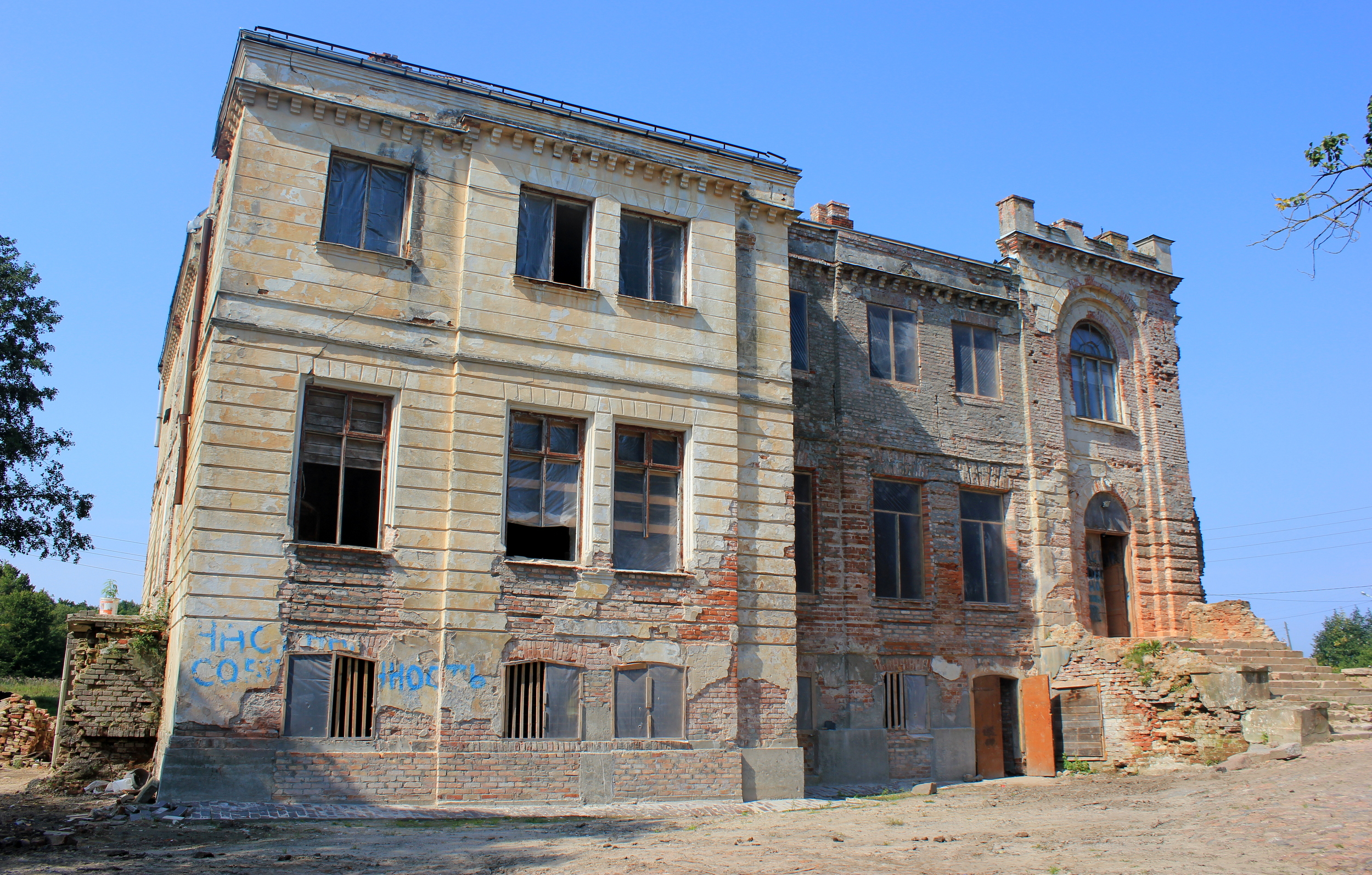
- Grünhof palace in Roshchino
- Interactive map of Roshchino
- Location of Roshchino Roshchino (European Russia) Roshchino (Russia)
- Coordinates: 54°54′24″N 20°22′9″E
- Country: Russia
- Federal subject: Kaliningrad Oblast

Population
  - Estimate (2010): 271 )
- Time zone: UTC+2 (MSK–1)
- Postal code: 238553
- OKTMO ID: 27710000326

Roshchino (Russian: Рощино, Lithuanian: Griunhofas) is a rural settlement in Zelenogradsky District of Kaliningrad Oblast, Russia. It is located in Sambia.

== History ==
From 1815 to 1943, the local palace was a possession of the Bülow family. In 1938, the owner allowed for the establishment of a local branch of the National Socialist People's Welfare in the palace. During the German invasion of Poland, which started World War II in September 1939, the Germans imprisoned the staff and older schoolchildren of the Polish gymnasium in Kwidzyn in the palace.
