= Coat of arms of Kaliningrad Oblast =

- Full coat of arms

Versions
- Lesser coat of arms
- Adopted: 8 or 9 June 2006

The coat of arms of Kaliningrad Oblast is the official heraldic achievement of Kaliningrad Oblast in Russia.

== History ==
The coat of arms was adopted on 8 or 9 of June, 2006, following a vote in the Kaliningrad Oblast Duma. It was passed in Law No. 16, which also approved the flag of Kaliningrad Oblast.

== Description ==
The coat of arms of Kaliningrad Oblast is a red heraldic shield. A white castle with two crenellated towers is in the center. The bottom of the coat of arms is blue, symbolizizing sea waves, and is marked by five golden circles.

The full coat of arms is topped with an golden crown and surrounded by the ribbon of the Order of Lenin, which Kaliningrad Oblast was awarded in 1966 at the 20th anniversary of the end of World War II. Above the castle is the monogram of Empress Elizabeth of Russia.

The castle and monogram are also present in the top left corner of the flag of Kaliningrad Oblast.

== See also ==
- Coat of arms of Kaliningrad
