= Marienkhof =

Former Air base in Kaliningrad Oblast, Russia

Marienkhof/Dunayevka
- Pionersky, Kaliningrad Oblast in Russia

Site information
- Type: Air Base
- Owner: Ministry of Defence
- Operator: Russian Air Force

Location
- Shown within Kaliningrad Oblast Marienkhof (Russia)
- Coordinates: 54°51′54″N 020°11′6″E

Site history
- Built: 1950
- In use: 1950s - present

Airfield information
- Identifiers: ICAO: ZA7X
- Elevation: 58 metres (190 ft) AMSL
Runways
Direction	Length and surface
03/21	2,000 metres (6,562 ft) Concrete

Marienkhof (German) (Dunayevka (Russian), Kottslyauken (US)) is a former air base in Kaliningrad Oblast, Russia located 10 km south of Pionersky. It was in use during the 1950s and has been abandoned near the end of the Cold War. It has a spartan layout, unimproved pads, if any, and an alert strip feeding directly onto the runway threshold.

In the mid-1950s up to 75 Ilyushin Il-28 (ASCC: Beagle) tactical bombers were based at Marienkhof. The 15th independent Reconnaissance Aviation Regiment arrived in 1954 and left in 1956 , and the 1st Guards and 51st Maritime Torpedo Aviation Regiments were based here which disbanded 1 July 1960. Both were under the Baltic Fleet's 8th Mine-Torpedo Aviation Division.

At the Dunaevka airfield, the 469th Aircraft Storage Base was formed, where the Il-28s of the disbanded 8th MTAD and 128th Guards MTAD were transferred. The storage base existed for one year.

There was a significant drawdown in forces by 1962, by which aircraft were rarely observed at the airfield except for the occasional Il-28, indicating Marienkhof became a reserve airfield.

With the development of aviation, the runway no longer met modern requirements in terms of load capacity and length. The Dunaevka airfield became a reserve airfield for the fighter aviation regiment based at Nivenskoye. Until 1984, communications and radio technical support for flights were deployed at the Dunaevka airfield. In 1989, the Soviet Armed Forces finally abandoned the Dunaevka airfield.

It is now the location of Pionersky Radar Station.
