= Pionersky Radar Station =

Russian radar station near Kaliningrad

Pionersky Radar Station
- Пионерский РЛС-Pionersky RLS
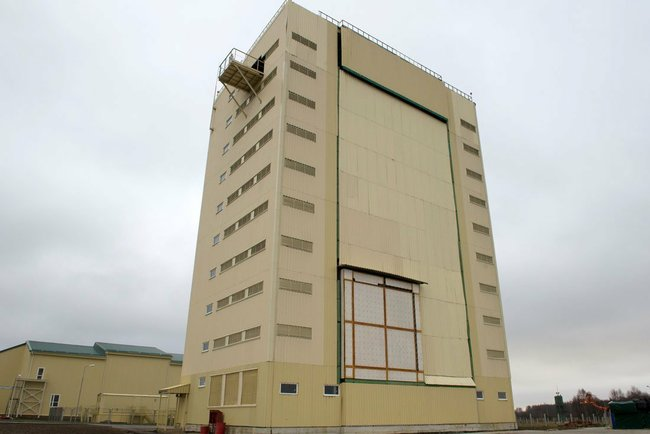
- Radar array under construction in Pionersky

Site information
- Type: Radar Station
- Owner: Russian Aerospace Forces
- Controlled by: Russian Space Forces
- Open to the public: no
- Condition: operational

Location
- Pionersky located in Russia
- Coordinates: 54.857294°N 20.18235°E

Site history
- Built: 2010
- Built by: Russia
- In use: Russia

Pionersky Radar Station (Russian: Пионерский РЛС-Pionersky RLS) is an early-warning radar station near Pionersky in Kaliningrad Oblast, Russia. It is a key part of the Russian early warning system against ballistic missile attacks and is run by the Russian Space Forces.

The station is located on the former Dunayevka air base 10 kilometres (6.2 mi) south west of the village of Pionersky and 27 kilometres (17 mi) north west of Kaliningrad.

The radar is modular and can be put into testing mode before being fully completed. It was announced in November 2011 that the radar was operational but without a fully completed array. Previously Oleg Ostapenko, commander of the Russian Space Forces was quoted as saying in January 2011 that it had started working whilst being built and Vladimir Popovkin, then First Deputy Minister of Defence, was quoted as saying in February 2011 that it will not be complete until 2016. It is fully operational in 2014.

The radar is estimated to cost 4.43 billion rubles.

== Voronezh radar ==
Voronezh radar are highly prefabricated radars needing fewer personnel and using less energy than previous generations. The one being built in Pionersky is a Voronezh-DM, a UHF radar with a 6,000 km stated range.
