= Flag of Kaliningrad Oblast =

Flag of Kaliningrad Oblast

The flag of the Russian exclave of Kaliningrad Oblast is a rectangle with a ratio of 2:5 divided into three horizontal stripes. The upper stripe is red, a thin (1/3 of the upper strip) yellow stripe in the middle and a dark blue stripe of the same size as the red bar. In the canton is a silver-and-black stylized medieval castle with open gates and the monogram of Empress Elizabeth Petrovna (under whose reign parts of the region were shortly under Russian control during the Seven Years' War).

The law does not state what the colours stand for. In the Russian press it was stated that the silver fortress with open gates stands for hospitality, the dark blue for the Baltic Sea and tranquility, the yellow for the wealth of amber and the red for active man principle (цвет активного мужского начала).

The law about the flag and the coat of arms went into effect on 9 June 2006. Previously this westernmost Russian region had no flag. When plans were made to adopt a flag another proposal was a tricolour with 3 horizontal stripes in green, white and dark blue similar to the flag of Sierra Leone. Another proposal was similar to the flag of Scotland, but with a yellow St. Andrew's Cross.

== Other flags ==
=== Administrative divisions ===
Flag	Date	Use	Description
	1996–present	Flag of Kaliningrad city	A coat of arms in front of a ship on an all blue background.
	?–present	Flag of Baltiysk	
	October 2016–present	Flag of Pionersky	
	January 2016–October 2016	Flag of Pionersky	Plain white flag with the emblem in the middle.
	?–January 2016	Flag of Pionersky	Plain white flag with the emblem in the middle.
	?–present	Flag of Svetlogorsk	
	?–present	Flag of Sovetsk	
	?–present	Flag of Bagrationovsky District	
	?–present	Flag of Ladushkin	
	?–present	Flag of Gvardeysky District	
	2017–present	Flag of Guryevsky District	
	?–2017	Flag of Guryevsky District	
	2005–present	Flag of Gusevsky District	
	?–2005	Flag of Gusevsky District	
	?–present	Flag of Zelenogradsky District	
	?–present	Flag of Krasnoznamensky District	
	?–present	Flag of Nemansky District	
	?–present	Flag of Ozyorsky District	
	?–present	Flag of Ozyorsky District	
	?–present	Flag of Pravdinsky District	
	?–present	Flag of Slavsky District	
	?–present	Flag of Chernyakhovsky District	

=== Settlements ===
Flag	Date	Use	Description
	?–present	Flag of Zelenogradsk	
