= Pionersky, Kaliningrad Oblast =

Town in Kaliningrad Oblast, Russia

Pionersky Пионерский
- Town
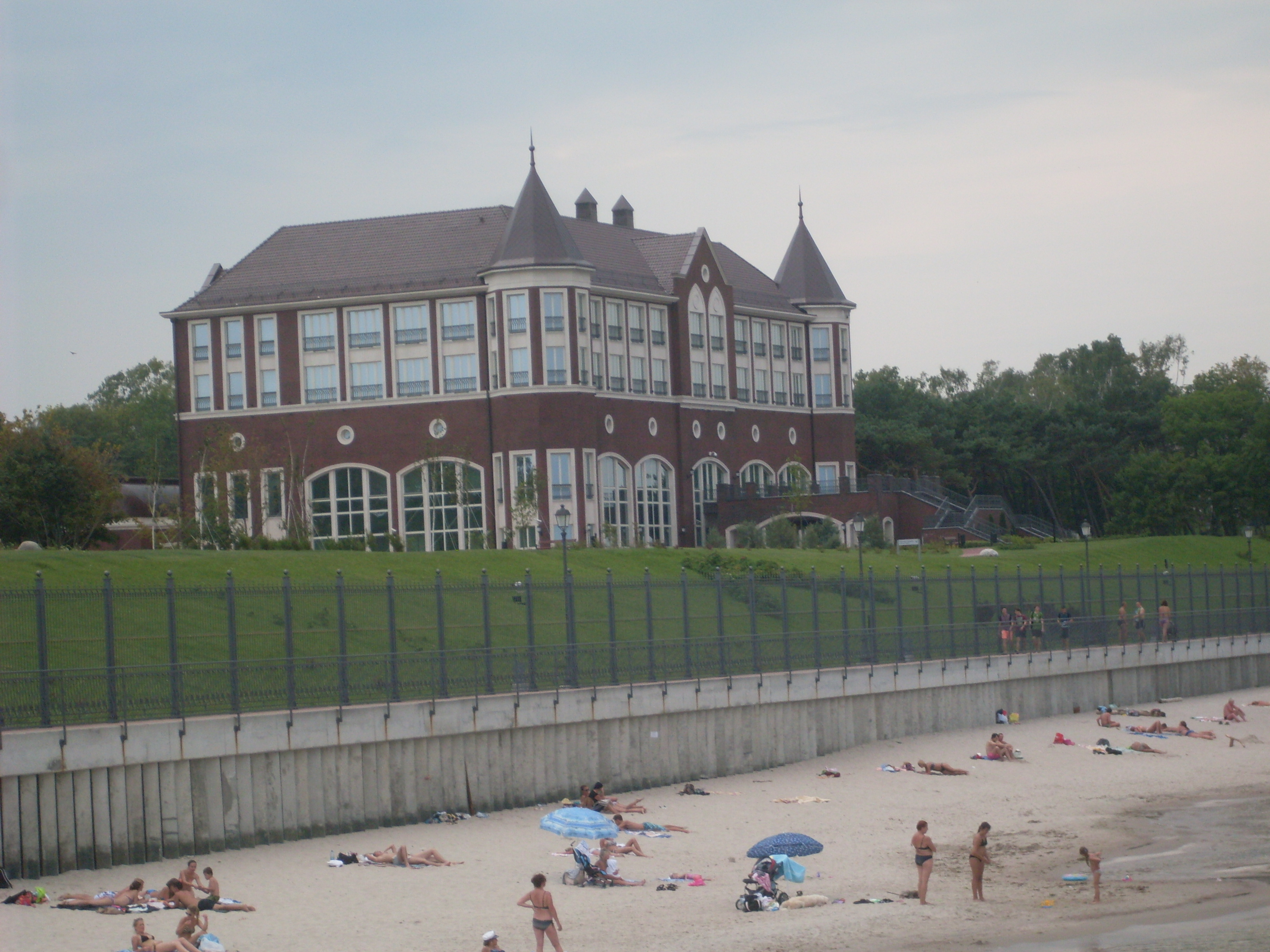

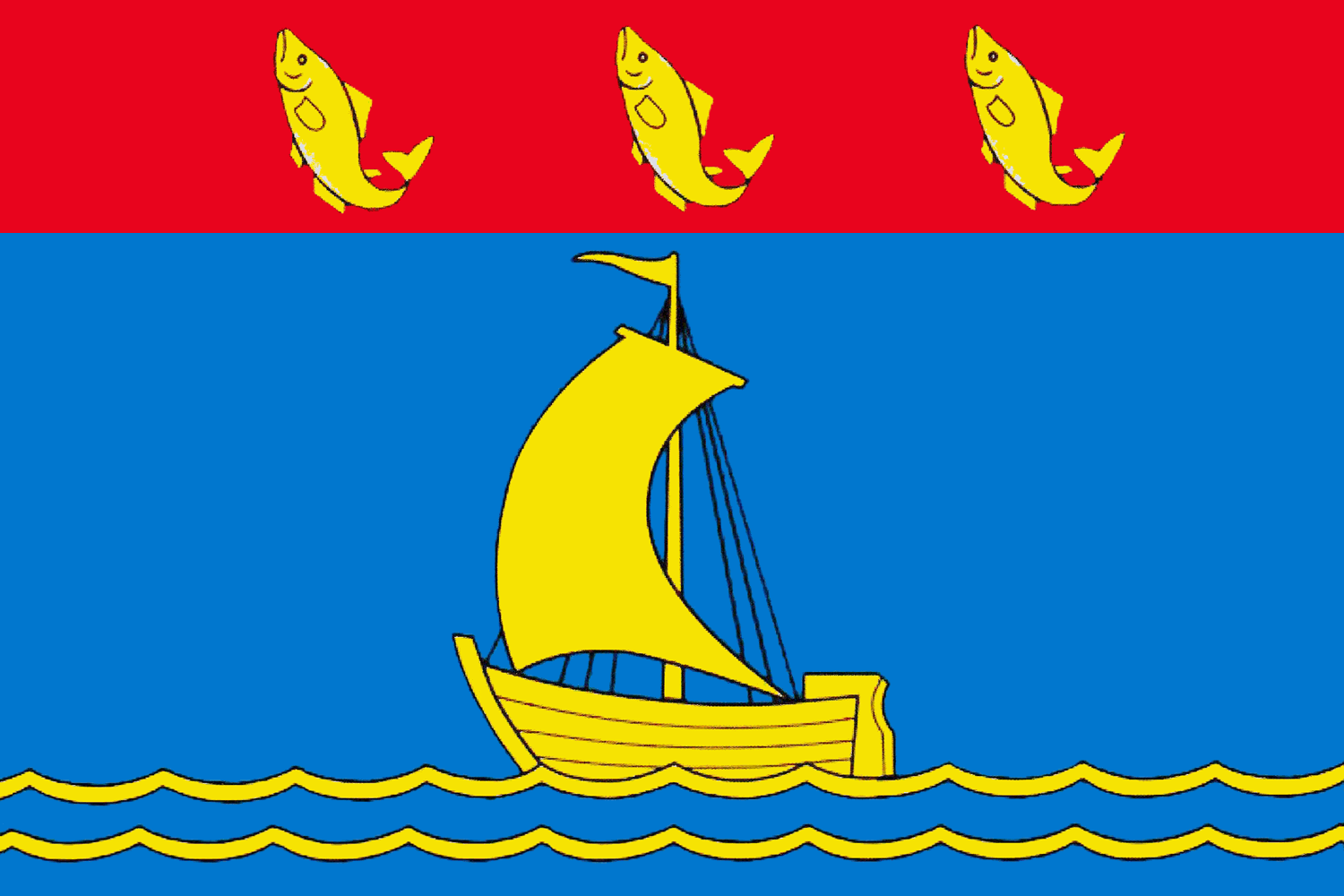
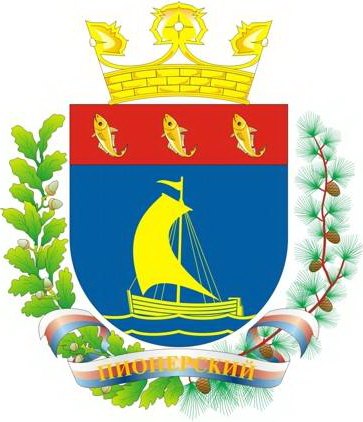
- Flag Coat of arms
- Interactive map of Pionersky
- Location of Pionersky Pionersky (European Russia) Pionersky (Europe)
- Coordinates: 54°57′06″N 20°14′00″E
- Country: Russia
- Federal subject: Kaliningrad Oblast
- First mentioned: 1254
- Town status since: 1952
- Elevation: 20 m (66 ft)

Population (2010 Census)
  - Total: 11,016
  - Estimate (1 January 2024): 12,928 (+17.4%)

Administrative status
  - Subordinated to: town of oblast significance of Pionersky
  - Capital of: town of oblast significance of Pionersky

Municipal status
  - Urban okrug: Pionersky Urban Okrug
  - Capital of: Pionersky Urban Okrug
- Time zone: UTC+2 (MSK–1)
- Postal code: 238590
- OKTMO ID: 27717000001

Pionersky (Russian: Пионе́рский; German: Neukuhren ; Lithuanian: Kuršiai) is a town in Kaliningrad Oblast, Russia, located along the Baltic Sea on the Sambian Peninsula, between Zelenogradsk and Svetlogorsk. Population figures: 11,016 (2010 census); 11,816 (2002 census); 11,635 (1989 Soviet census).

The Residence of the President of the Russian Federation "Yantar" and the only Federal Children's orthopedic sanatorium in Russia "Pionersk" are located in the town.

== History ==
The village was first mentioned in 1254. After the Thirteen Years' War (1454–1466), the area became a part of a Polish fief held by the Teutonic Knights and by secular Ducal Prussia until 1657. From 1701, it formed part of the Kingdom of Prussia, and from 1871 it was also part of Germany. In 1878, the village had a population of 566, mostly employed in fishing.

It was annexed by the Soviet Union in 1945 upon the end of World War II and renamed Pionersky after the children's health camp of the Young Pioneer organization of the Soviet Union that was established in the town after the war by the new Soviet authorities. The town's small harbor, formerly used only for fishing, now accommodates sailboats and beach tourism.

== Administrative and municipal status ==
Administratively, it is incorporated as the town of oblast significance of Pionersky—an administrative unit with the status equal to that of the districts. Municipally, the town of oblast significance of Pionersky is incorporated as Pionersky Urban Okrug.

== Military ==
Pionersky Radar Station is located 10 kilometers (6.2 mi) to the south of the town on the former Dunayevka air base.

== International relations ==
=== Twin towns and sister cities ===
Pionersky is twinned with:

- Bartoszyce, Poland

== Gallery ==
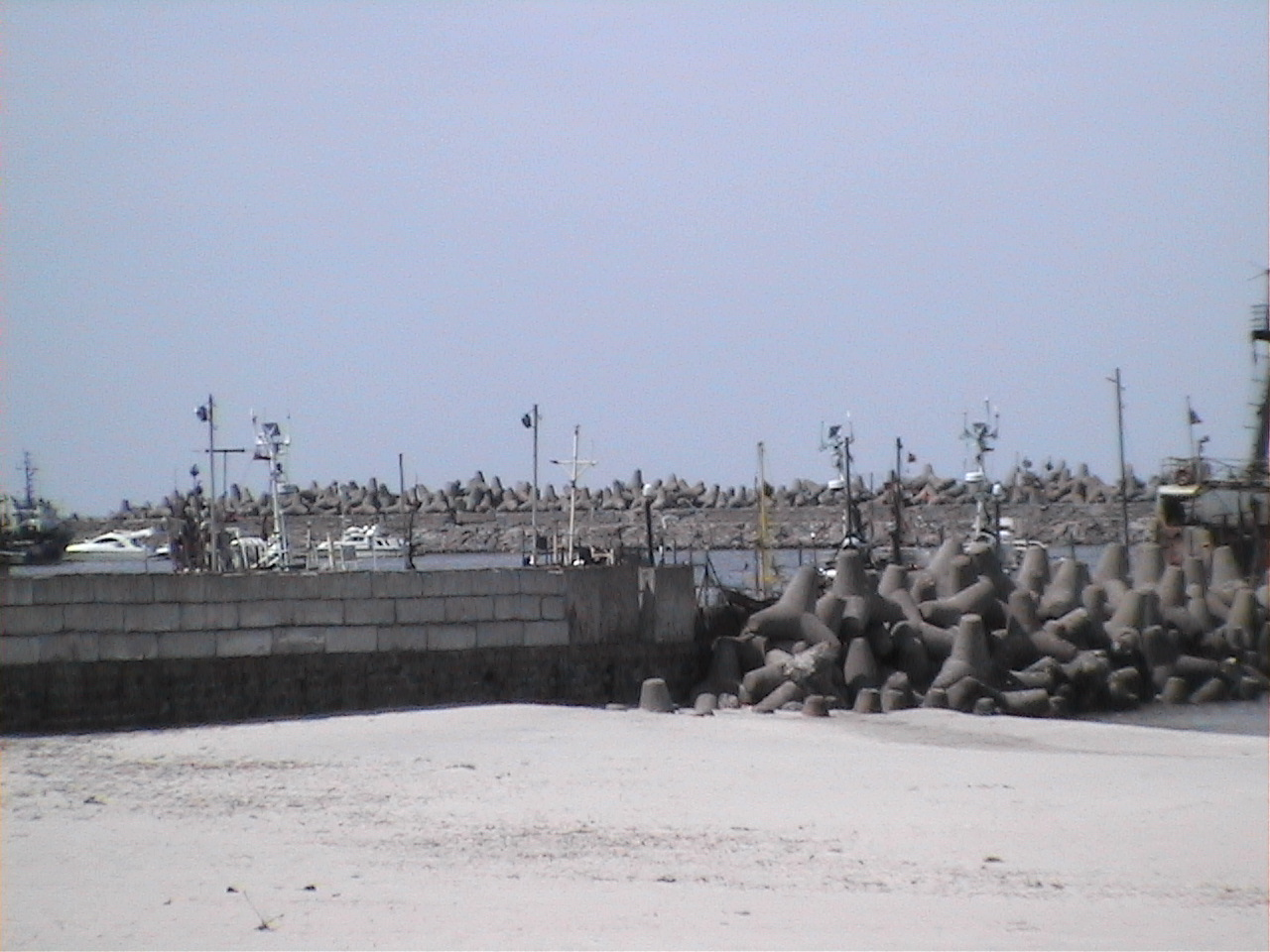
Seaside view in Pionersky

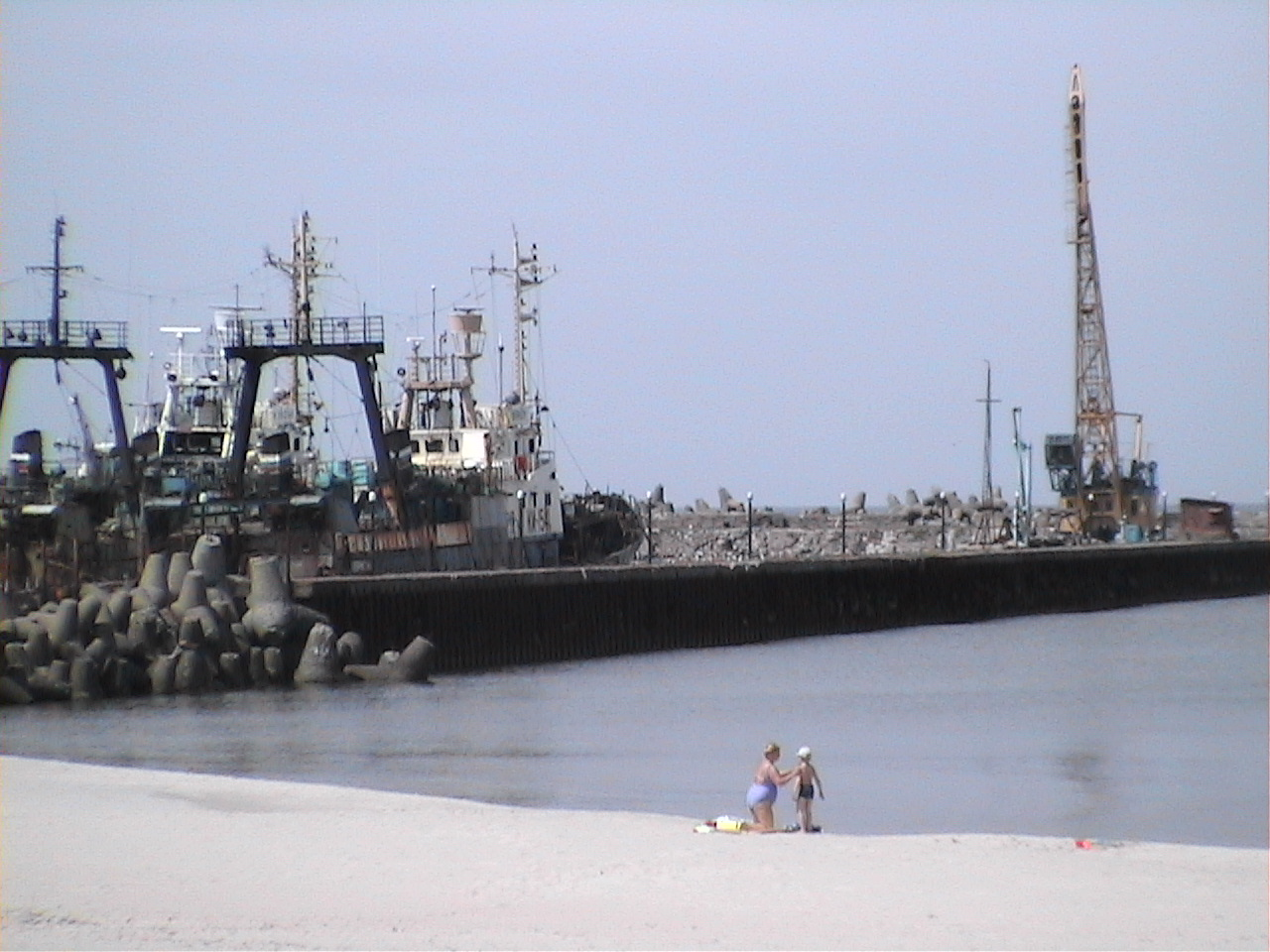
Beach and harbor in Pionersky

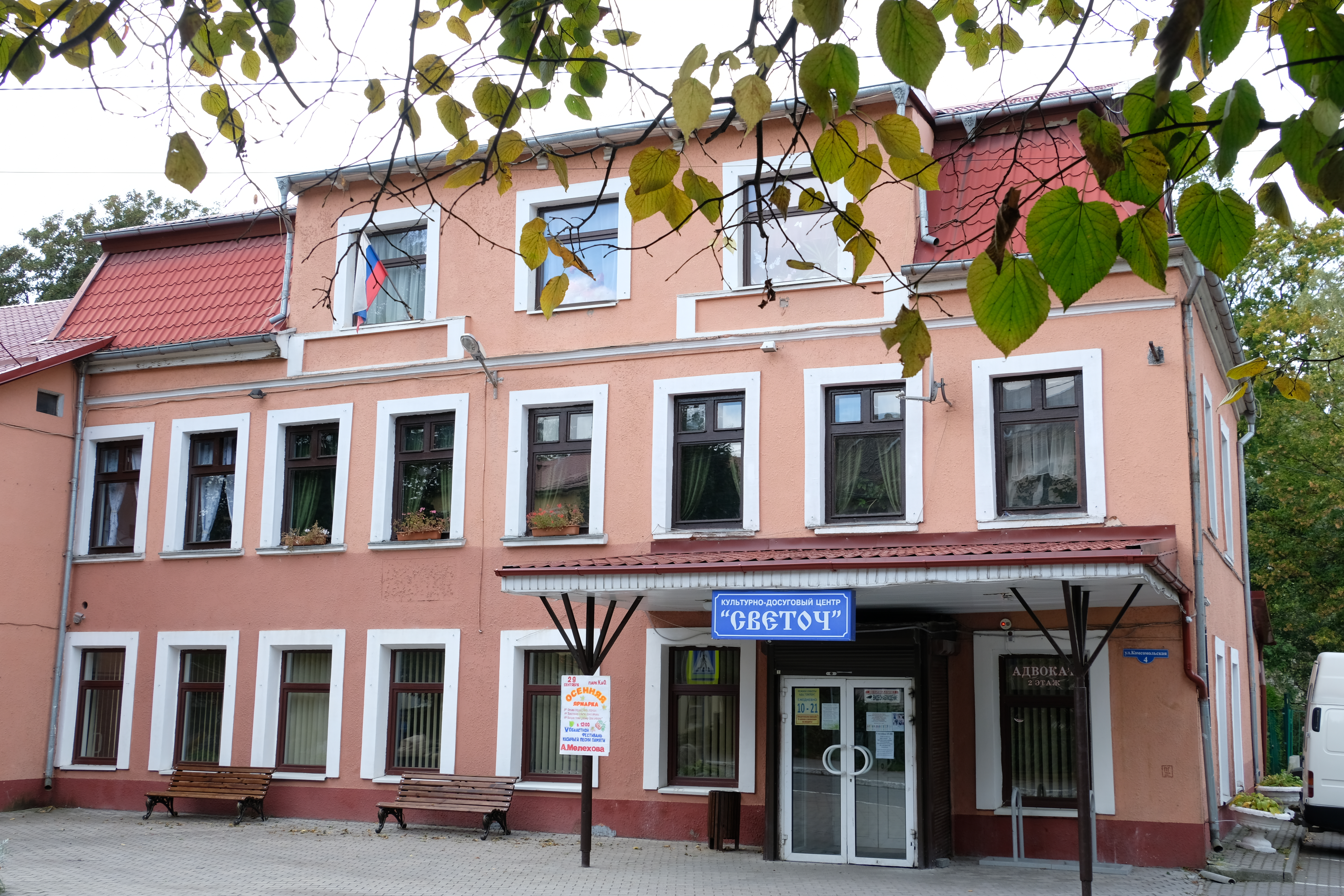
Cultural center

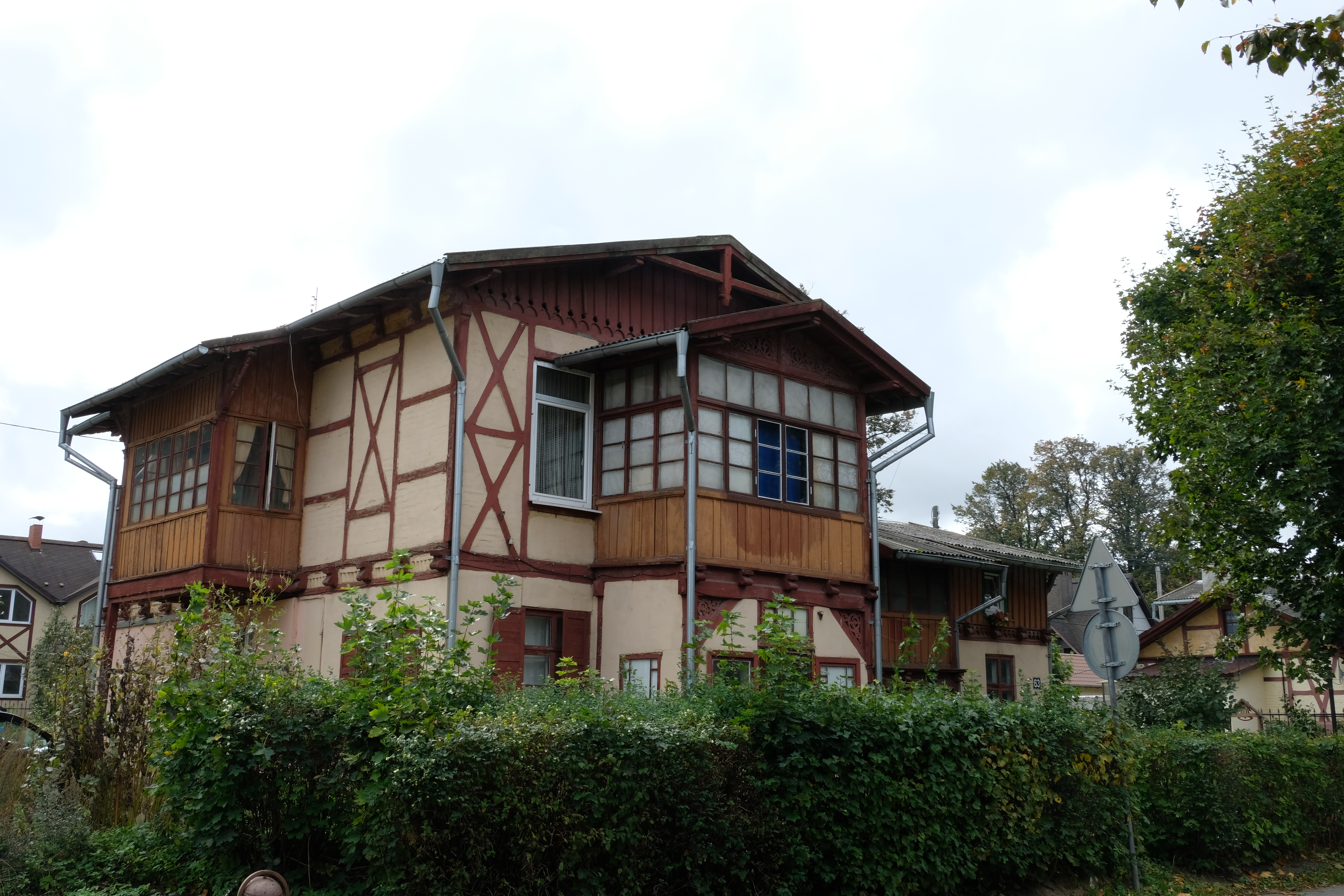
Typical old houses
