= Kaliningrad Oblast =

Exclave of Russia bounded by Poland, Lithuania, and the Baltic Sea

Kaliningrad Oblast Калининградская область (Russian)
- Oblast
- Flag Coat of arms

- Location in Russia (red)

- Location in Europe (dark green)
- Coordinates: 54°48′N 21°25′E
- Country: Russia
- Federal district: Northwestern
- Economic region: Kaliningrad
- Established: 7 April 1946
- Administrative center: Kaliningrad

Government
  - Body: Legislative Assembly
  - Governor: Alexey Besprozvannykh

Area
  - Total: 15,125 km^{2} (5,840 sq mi)
  - Rank: 76th

Population (2021 census)
  - Total: 1,029,966
  - Estimate (January 2020): 1,012,253
  - Rank: 56th
  - Density: 68.097/km^{2} (176.37/sq mi)
  - Urban: 76.8%
  - Rural: 23.2%

GDP (nominal, 2024)
  - Total: ₽968 billion (US$11.36 billion)
  - Per capita: ₽937,145 (US$10,996.64)
- Time zone: UTC+2 (MSK–1)
- ISO 3166 code: RU-KGD
- License plates: 39, 91
- OKTMO ID: 27000000
- Official languages: Russian
- Website: http://www.gov39.ru

Kaliningrad Oblast (Russian: Калининградская область, romanized: Kaliningradskaya oblastʹ) is the westernmost federal subject of Russia. It is a semi-exclave on the Baltic Sea within the historical Baltic region of Prussia, bordered by Poland to the south, Lithuania to the north and east, and the Baltic Sea to the west. The largest city and administrative centre is Kaliningrad. The port town of Baltiysk is Russia's only port on the Baltic Sea that remains ice-free in winter. Kaliningrad Oblast had a population of roughly one million in the 2021 Russian census. It has an area of 15,125 square kilometres (5,840 sq mi).

The territory that is now Kaliningrad was formerly the northern part of East Prussia and overwhelmingly inhabited by Germans. Following the defeat of Nazi Germany in World War II, the Soviet Union annexed the region into the Russian SFSR. In the post-war era, the flight and expulsion of Germans left the area largely unpopulated until it was resettled by Soviet citizens, mostly ethnic Russians, who make up the area's dominant demographic today.

== History ==
The territory of what is now the Kaliningrad Oblast used to be inhabited by the Old Prussians and other Western Balts, prior to the Teutonic conquest in the early Late Middle Ages. Afterwards, it was settled extensively by Germans, with settlement initially concentrated more heavily in the west and later spreading eastward. Lithuanian settlement was particularly significant in the northeast, while Masurians and other Polish-speaking settlers were present in smaller numbers, especially in Königsberg and along the southern fringe. The Old Prussians became extinct due to Germanisation in the first half of the 18th century. The Lithuanian-inhabited areas of the Teutonic State were known as Lithuania Minor, which encompassed all of modern Kaliningrad Oblast until the 18th century.

=== Late Middle Ages ===
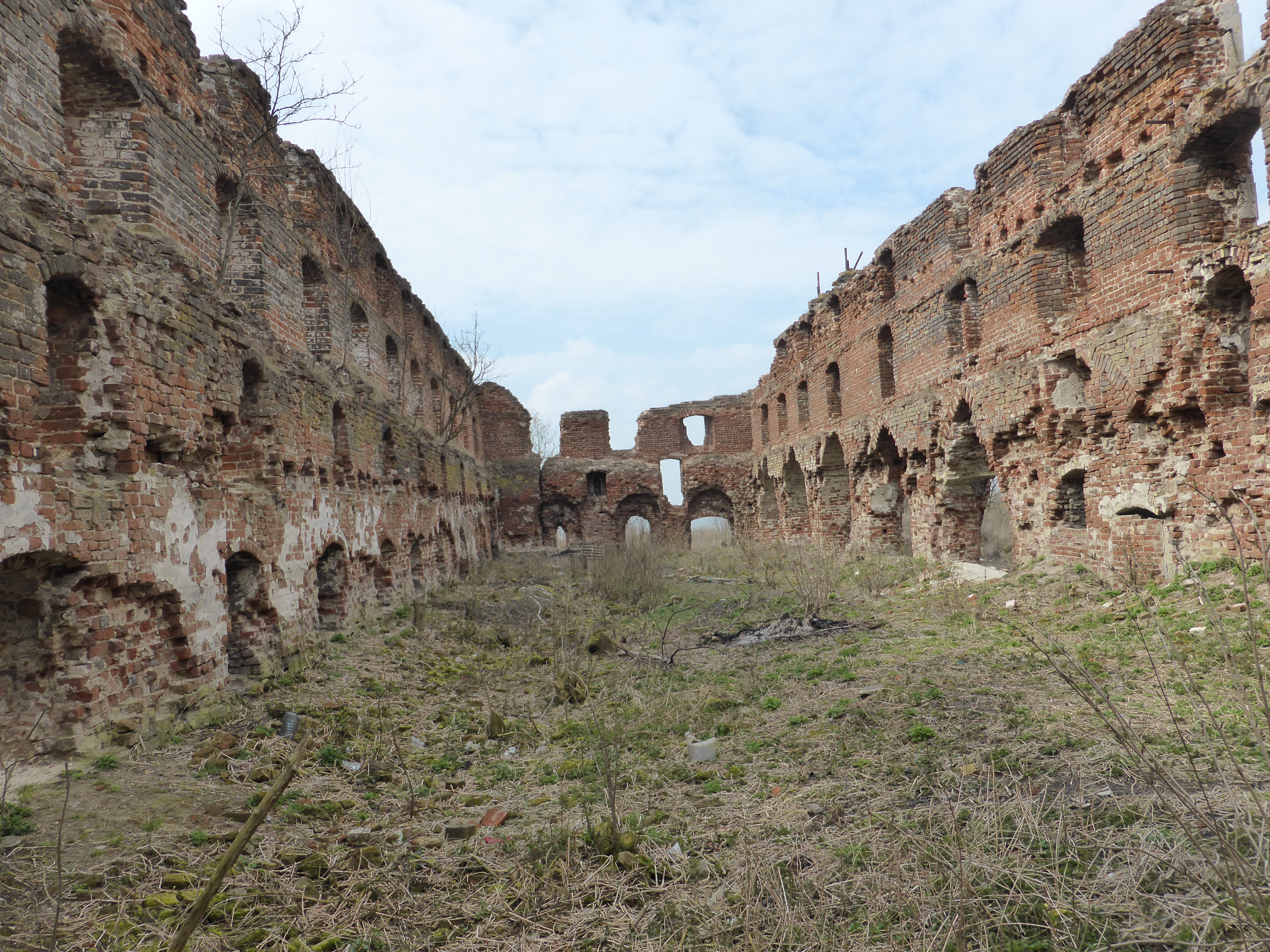
Medieval castle ruins in Ushakovo

In the 13th century, the Teutonic Order conquered the region and established the State of the Teutonic Order, a theocracy. In 1255, on the foundations of a destroyed Sambian settlement known as Tvanksta, the Teutonic Order founded the city of Königsberg (modern Kaliningrad), naming it in honour of Ottokar II of Bohemia.

The Northern Crusades, including the Lithuanian Crusade, were partly motivated by colonization. The German colonist peasants, craftsmen, and merchants were predominantly concentrated in the southern part of the Teutonic State and did not move into Nadruvia and Skalvia due to the Lithuanian military threat.

In 1454, following a request by the Prussian Confederation (a league formed in opposition to the Teutonic Order), the territory was incorporated into the Crown of the Kingdom of Poland by King Casimir IV Jagiellon, an event that sparked the Thirteen Years' War (1454–1466). After Poland's victory in the war with the Second Peace of Thorn, the State of the Teutonic Order became a vassal state of Poland. During this war, the capital of the Teutonic state was moved from Marienburg (now Malbork) to Königsberg in 1457. When the rulers of Prussia were vassals of the King of Poland from 1466 to 1660, there were few German colonists.

=== Early modern period ===
After the Teutonic Order lost the war of 1519–1521 with Poland, the Teutonic Order remained a vassal of the Kingdom of Poland. In 1525, Grand Master Albert of Brandenburg secularized the Teutonic Order's Prussian branch and established himself as ruler of the Duchy of Prussia, the first Protestant state in Europe. Königsberg was the residence of the Duke of Prussia from 1525 until 1701, and was the Duchy of Prussia's capital until 1660, when the capital moved to Berlin.

Polish and Lithuanian culture blossomed in Königsberg, with the city being the place of publication of the first Polish- and Lithuanian-language Catechism (by Jan Seklucjan and Martynas Mažvydas), the first Polish translation of the New Testament, Grammatica Litvanica, the first Lithuanian grammar book, and the Albertina University being the second oldest university of the Polish–Lithuanian Commonwealth, after receiving a royal privilege from King Sigismund II Augustus in 1560. Polish printing continued for centuries with the last Polish publication in 1931.

In 1577, the Duke of Prussia forbade serfs—who were mostly Old Prussians, Lithuanians, and Masurians—to leave the land that was the property of the German knights who became proprietary nobles.

In 1618, the Duchy merged with the Margraviate of Brandenburg to form Brandenburg-Prussia, remaining under Polish suzerainty until 1660. There was strong opposition to the separation of the region from Poland, especially in Königsberg. A confederation was formed in the city to maintain Poland's sovereignty over the city and region. The Brandenburg Elector and his army, however, entered the city and abducted and imprisoned the leader of the city's anti-Elector opposition Hieronymus Roth. In 1663, the city burghers, forced by Elector Frederick William, swore an oath of allegiance to him, however, in the same ceremony they still also pledged allegiance to Poland.

In 1724, King Frederick William I of Prussia prohibited Poles, Samogitians and Jews from settling in Lithuania Minor, and initiated German colonization to change the region's ethnic composition. In 1734–1736, Königsberg was the place of stay of Polish King Stanisław Leszczyński during the War of the Polish Succession. In 1756 Russia decided to go to war with the Kingdom of Prussia and annex the territory, which was then to be offered to Poland as part of a territorial exchange desired by Russia. The territory was occupied and annexed by Russia in 1758 during the Seven Years' War before being returned to Prussia in 1762 when Russia switched sides in the war. It was then reorganized into the province of East Prussia within the Kingdom of Prussia in 1773.

The current oblast also contains the now abandoned village of Narmeln (Polish: Polski), which was not part of Ducal Prussia, but of the Pomeranian Voivodeship of the Kingdom of Poland until its annexation by the Kingdom of Prussia the Second Partition of Poland in 1793, and is thus part of the historic region of Pomerania.

=== 19th century ===
==== Napoleonic invasion and occupation ====
After the defeats of Jena–Auerstedt, the Kingdom of Prussia was invaded and Berlin was occupied by the French. The Court of Prussia fled to Königsberg, asking for Russian help. Russia intervened, leading to the bloody Battle of Eylau and Battle of Friedland in 1807. Following a French victory in the latter, both sides signed the Treaties of Tilsit.

==== Historical ethnic and religious structure ====
In 1817, East Prussia had 796,204 Protestants, 120,123 Catholics, 2,389 Jews, and 864 Mennonites.

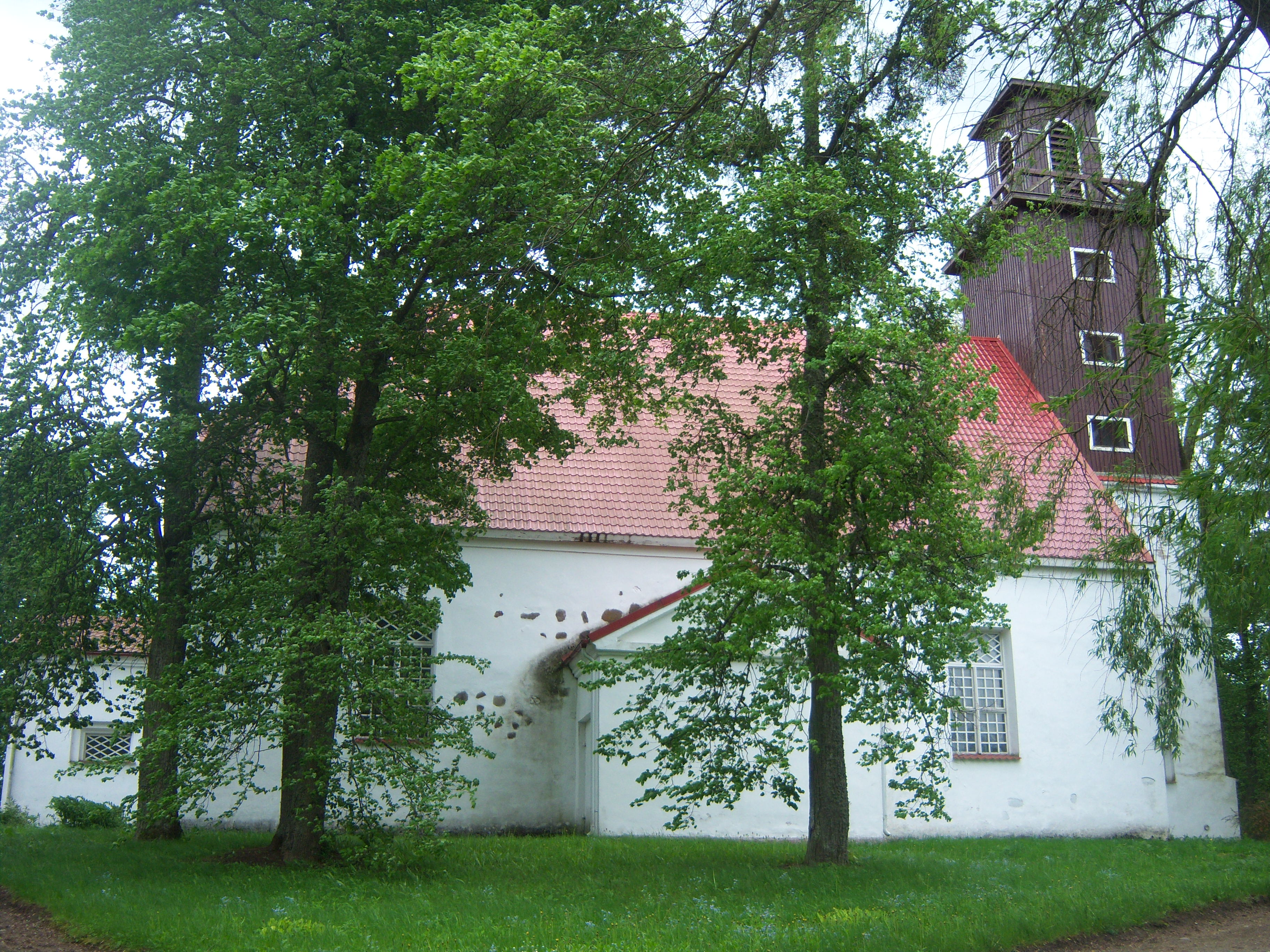
Memorial Museum of Kristijonas Donelaitis in Chistye Prudy

In 1824, shortly before its merger with West Prussia, the population of East Prussia was 1,080,000 people. According to Karl Andree, Germans were slightly more than half of the people, while 280,000 (~26%) were ethnically Polish and 200,000 (~19%) were ethnically Lithuanian. According to Georg Hassel, in 1819 there were also around 20,000 ethnic Curonians and Latvians combined, as well as 2,400 Jews. Similar numbers are given by August von Haxthausen in his 1839 book, with a breakdown by county. However, the majority of East Prussian Polish and Lithuanian inhabitants were Lutherans, not Catholics like their ethnic kinsmen across the border in the Russian Empire. Only in southern Warmia did Catholic Poles—so called Warmians (not to be confused with predominantly Protestant Masurians)—comprise the majority of the population, numbering 26,067 people (~81%) in county Allenstein (Polish: Olsztyn) in 1837.

==== German culture and Germanization ====
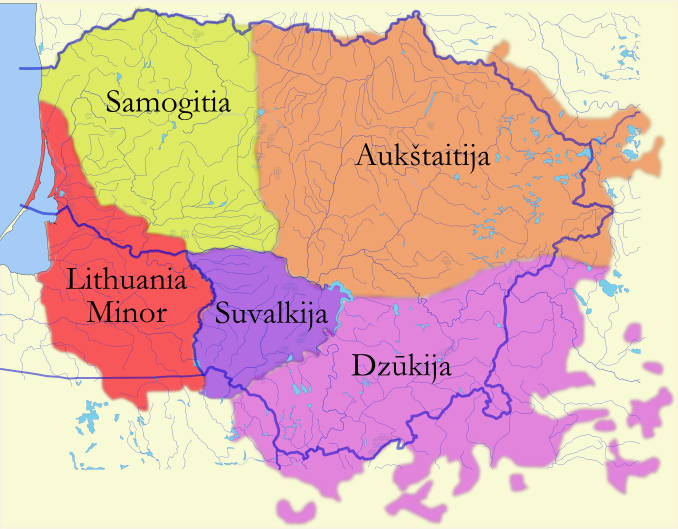
Historic Lithuania Minor (red) comprised the eastern part of the Prussian region that is now Kaliningrad Oblast

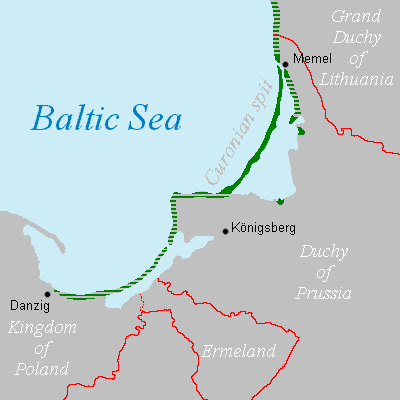
Curonian Spit in 1649, inhabited by the Kursenieki

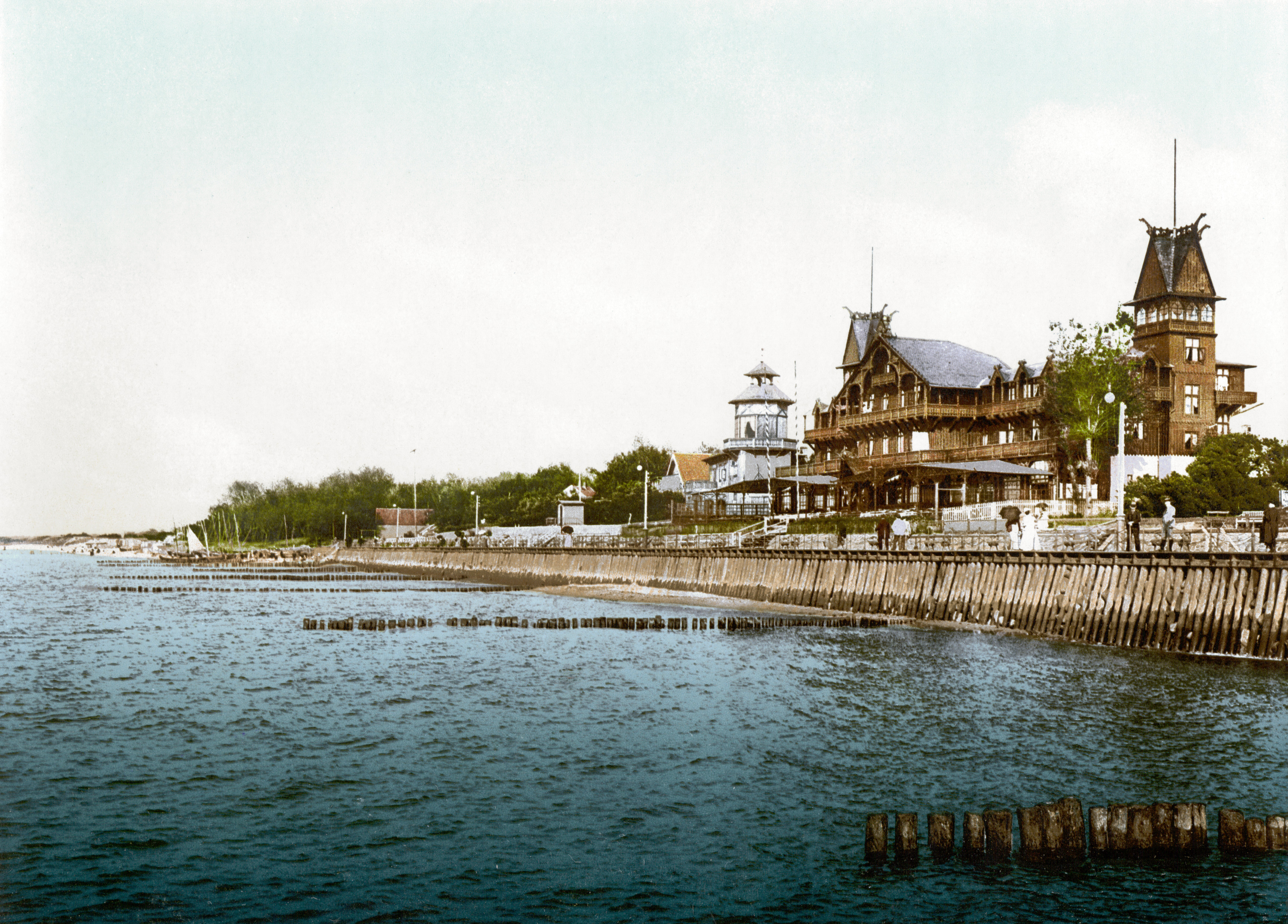
Resort town of Cranz (Zelenogradsk today) as it looked circa 1900. It was a destination for German artists and intelligentsia

In the 19th century, East Prussia was commonly viewed by German commentators as culturally backwards and a part of the "German mission in the East" rather than a core German territory. Pan-Germanist politician Ernst Hasse criticised the lack of folk identity and imagined community: "It is the case that there is almost no common folk identity [Landsmannschaften] among the Poseners and Prussians at all. [...] Who can recognise a Posener or Prussian by dialect and character? Distinct features hardly exist." While the north of East Prussia was overwhelmingly German, the south was majority Slavic and mostly composed of Poles and Masurians. There was also a slight Lithuanian majority in the north-eastern area of East Prussia, Lithuania Minor. Regional and local identities were particularly strong in East Prussia - local Polish population often identified with Masuria rather than Poland, and Prussian Lithuanians also did not actively identify themselves with the Lithuanian nation. Moreover, confessional identity often prevailed over the national one - German authorities were concerned about the "Catholic-Polish axis"; German Catholics were alienated from the German nation because of the Kulturkampf legislation, and tended to support the Polish national movement. An East German newspaper Thorner Zeitung reported in 1871 that "not only Polish Catholics, but also a great number of German Catholics, are willing to vote for a Polish party candidate".

By the end of the 19th century, East Prussia had a significant Polish minority, and German nationalist circles warned of the prospect of Polonisation of East Prussia. The perceived weakness of Germanness of East Prussia was also reinforced by the Ostflucht, as East Prussia suffered from both underindustrialisation and rural overpopulation. After 1876, farm prices in East Prussia fell by 20 percent, which encouraged local landowners to hire foreign workers from Congress Poland, incidentally strengthening the Polish element in the region. The increased Slavic immigration to the region generated by the requirement of the Junkers for cheap labour and better economic conditions in West Germany caused many German inhabitants to leave the region. Most Germans moved to work in the industrial heartland of western Germany, while others migrated abroad. Poles and Lithuanians of East Prussia also had much higher birth-rate and natural increase rates than the Germans, and rarely emigrated. Discussing the situation in East Prussia, Polish geographer Stanisław Srokowski remarked:

The Poles who live in the southern and western parts of East Prussia and the Lithuanians of the north-west have succeeded better than the Germans in reconciling their mode of life with their earnings. This has, of course, led to a lower standard of life, but it has enabled them to adapt themselves to actual conditions and even to prosper where the Germans fail. Moreover, both these national minorities in East Prussia are bound to the soil by centuries of tradition: they are not comparative new-comers like the majority of the Germans there. For these reasons, the Poles and Lithuanians in that province hardly ever emigrate from the land of their birth, especially as the emigration in question is not so attractive for them as for the Germans: proceeding to central or western Germany, the former would really be going to a foreign country, amongst people not speaking their language and having other customs than theirs.

The Memel Territory (Klaipėda region), formerly part of northeastern East Prussia as well as Prussian Lithuania, was annexed by Lithuania in 1923. In 1938, Nazi Germany radically renamed about a third of the place names of this area, replacing Old Prussian and Lithuanian names with newly invented German names.

=== 20th century ===
==== World War I and II ====
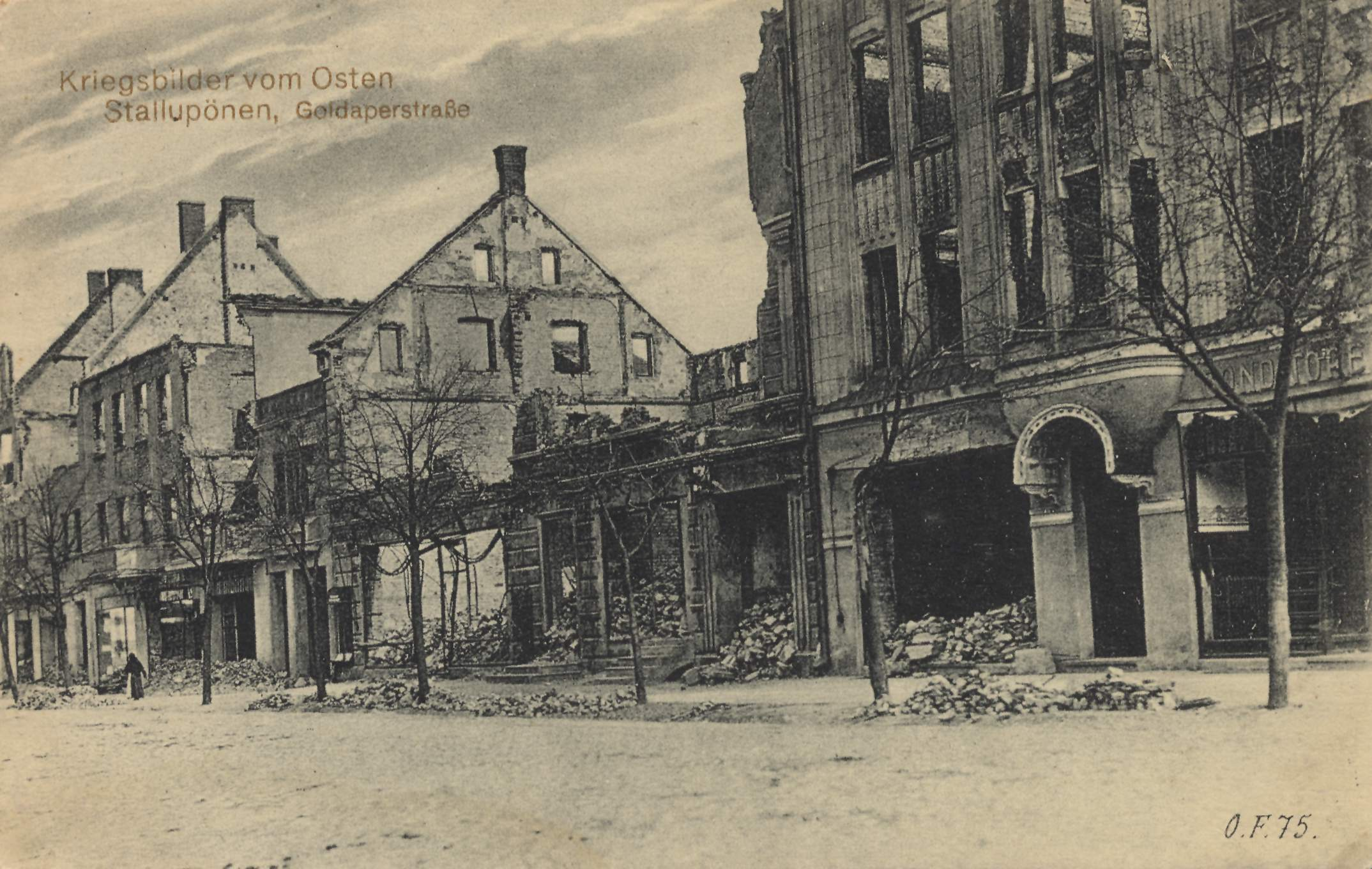
World War I destruction in Stallupönen, modern Nesterov

In September 1914, after hostilities began between the German Empire on the one hand and France and Russia on the other, the Imperial German Army was about to seize Paris, and the French urged Russia to attack East Prussia. Nicholas II launched a major attack, resulting in a Russian victory in the Battle of Gumbinnen. The Russian army arrived at the outskirts of the city of Königsberg but did not take it and settled at Insterburg. This Russian victory and East Prussia's occupation by Russia saved Paris by forcing the Germans to send many troops to their East provinces. Later, Hindenburg and Ludendorff pushed Russia back at the battle of Tannenberg, thereby liberating East Prussia from Russian troops. Yet Russian troops remained in the easternmost part of the region until early 1915.

During World War II, the Hohenbruch concentration camp was operated at modern Gromovo mostly interring Polish prisoners, as well as several subcamps of the Stutthof concentration camp, the Oflag 52, Oflag 60 and Dulag Luft prisoner-of-war camps, and a camp interring Romani people in Königsberg (see Romani Holocaust).

On 29 August 1944, Soviet troops reached the border of East Prussia. By January 1945, they had taken all of East Prussia except for the area around Königsberg. Many inhabitants fled west at this time. During the last days of the war, over two million people fled, anticipating imminent Red Army conquest, and were evacuated by sea.

==== Soviet annexation ====
Initially, at the end of World War II in 1945, the current southern border strip passed under Polish control with Polish administration organized in the towns of Gierdawy and Iławka, however, the area was eventually annexed by the Soviet Union and included within the Kaliningrad Oblast.

Under the Potsdam Agreement of 1 August 1945, Königsberg became part of the Soviet Union pending the final determination of territorial borders at an anticipated peace settlement. This final determination eventually took place on 12 September 1990 when the Treaty on the Final Settlement with Respect to Germany was signed. The excerpt from the initial agreement pertaining to the partition of East Prussia, including the area surrounding Königsberg, is as follows (note that Königsberg is spelt "Koenigsberg" in the original document):

VI. CITY OF KOENIGSBERG AND THE ADJACENT AREA
The Conference examined a proposal by the Soviet Government that pending the final determination of territorial questions at the peace settlement, the section of the western frontier of the Union of Soviet Socialist Republics which is adjacent to the Baltic Sea should pass from a point on the eastern shore of the Bay of Danzig to the east, north of Braunsberg – Goldep, to the meeting point of the frontiers of Lithuania, the Polish Republic and East Prussia.

The Conference has agreed in principle to the proposal of the Soviet Government concerning the ultimate transfer to the Soviet Union of the city of Koenigsberg and the area adjacent to it as described above, subject to expert examination of the actual frontier.

U.S. president Harry Truman and British prime minister Clement Attlee supported the proposal of the Conference at the forthcoming peace settlement.

In 1946, Königsberg was added as a semi-exclave to the Russian SFSR and renamed Kaliningrad, after the Chairman of the Presidium of the Supreme Soviet of the USSR Mikhail Kalinin. Kalinin was unrelated to the city, and there were already cities named in honour of Kalinin in the Soviet Union, namely Kalinin (now Tver) and Kaliningrad (now Korolev, Moscow Oblast). The German language was replaced with the Russian language, and the remaining German population was expelled between 1947 and 1948. The territory was then re-populated with Soviet citizens, mostly ethnic Russians but to a lesser extent also Ukrainians and Belarusians.

Some historians speculate that it may have originally been offered to the Lithuanian SSR because the resolution from the conference specifies that Kaliningrad's border would be at the (pre-war) Lithuanian frontier. According to some historians, Joseph Stalin created it as an oblast separate from the Lithuanian SSR because it further separated the Baltic states from the West. Others think that the reason was that the region was far too strategic for the USSR to leave it in the hands of another SSR other than the Russian one. In the 1950s, Nikita Khrushchev offered the entire Kaliningrad Oblast to the Lithuanian SSR but Antanas Sniečkus refused to accept the territory because it would add at least a million ethnic Russians to Lithuania proper.

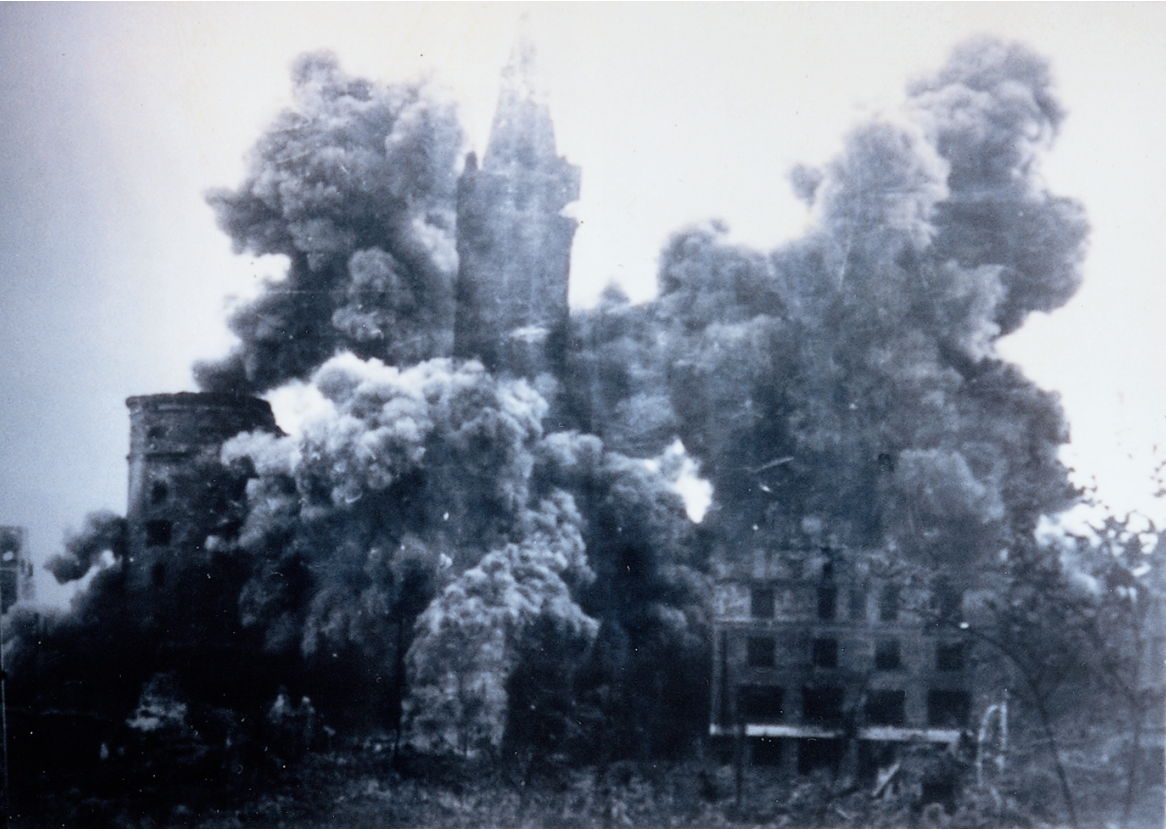
Demolition of the Königsberg Castle with explosives, 1959. The last remnants were destroyed by 1968.

In the Soviet era, the city was completely closed and, with the exception of rare visits of friendship from neighboring Poland, it was practically not visited by foreigners. In 1950, there were 1,165,000 inhabitants, which was only half the number of the pre-war population. The old city was not restored, and the ruins of the Königsberg Castle were demolished in the late 1960s, on Leonid Brezhnev's personal orders, despite the protests of architects, historians and residents of the city.

The reconstruction of the oblast, threatened by hunger in the immediate post-war years, was carried out through an ambitious policy of oceanic fishing with the creation of one of the main fishing harbours of the USSR in Kaliningrad city. Fishing not only fed the regional economy but also was a basis for social and scientific development, in particular oceanography. From 1953 to 1962, a monument to Stalin stood on Victory Square. In 1973, the town hall was turned into the House of Soviets. In 1975, the trolleybus was launched again. In 1980, a concert hall was opened in the building of the former Lutheran Church of the Holy Family. In 1986, the Kreuzkirche building was transferred to the Russian Orthodox Church.

In 1957, an agreement was signed and later came into force which delimited the border between the Polish People's Republic (a Soviet satellite state at the time) and the Soviet Union.

In 2010, the German magazine Der Spiegel published a report claiming that Kaliningrad had been offered to Germany in 1990 (against payment). The offer was not seriously considered by the West German government which, at the time, saw reunification with East Germany as a higher priority. However, this story was later denied by Mikhail Gorbachev.

=== Recent history ===
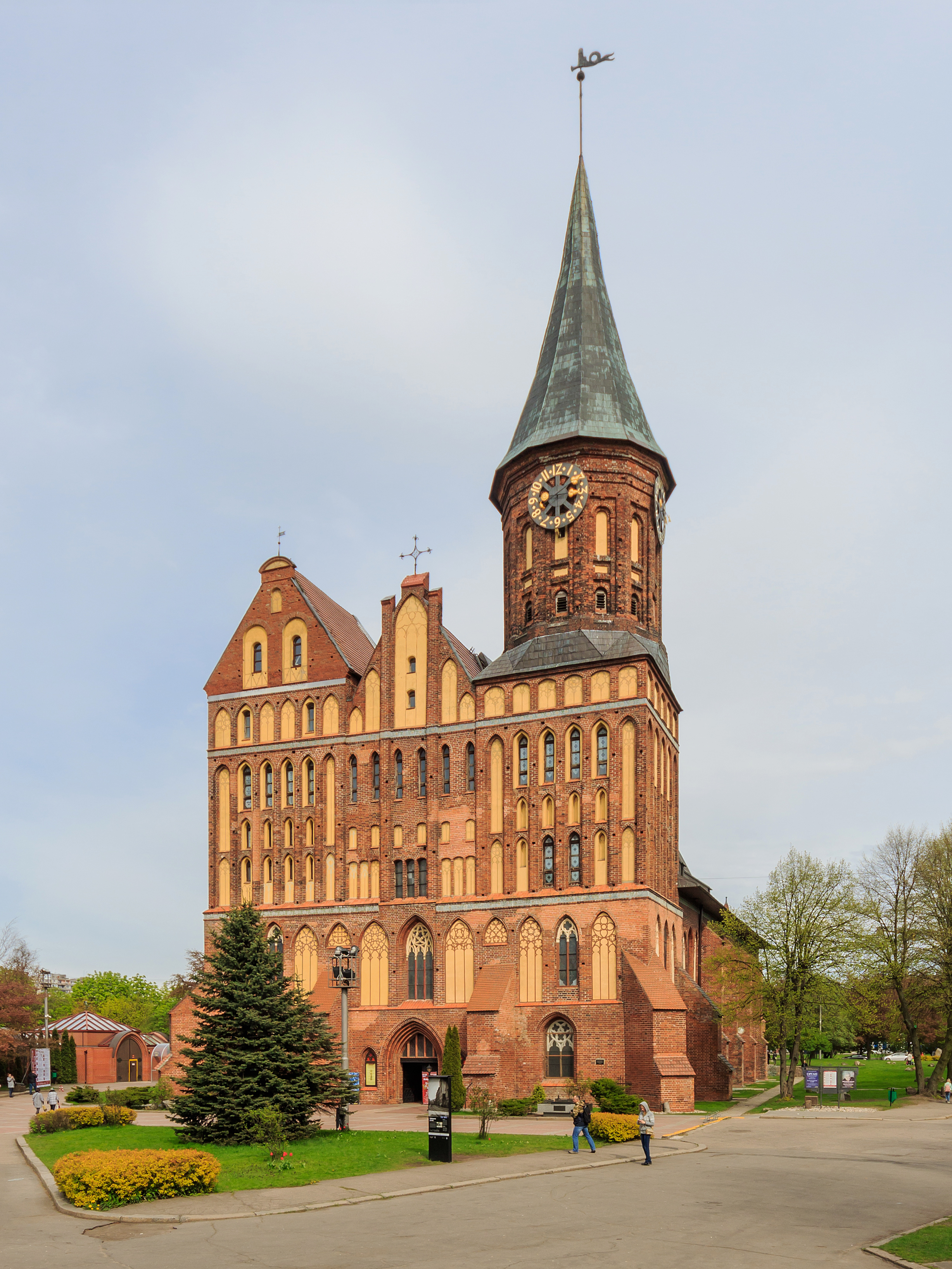
Königsberg Cathedral, restored in the 1990s

The independence of Lithuania in 1990 and full dissolution of the Soviet Union in 1991 isolated Kaliningrad from the rest of Russia, having previously been joined by other Soviet republics. This isolation became more severe when both Poland and Lithuania joined NATO and the European Union and imposed strict border controls on Kaliningrad Oblast. All military and civilian land links between the region and the rest of Russia now must pass through members of NATO and the EU. Thus far, the EU has rejected Russian proposals for visa-free travel between Kaliningrad and the rest of Russia. Travel arrangements based on the Facilitated Transit Document (FTD) and Facilitated Rail Transit Document (FRTD) have been made. Kaliningrad Oblast's geographic isolation has badly affected its economic situation. Concurrent significant reduction in the size of the Russian military garrison has hurt as well, since previously the military was a major local employer.

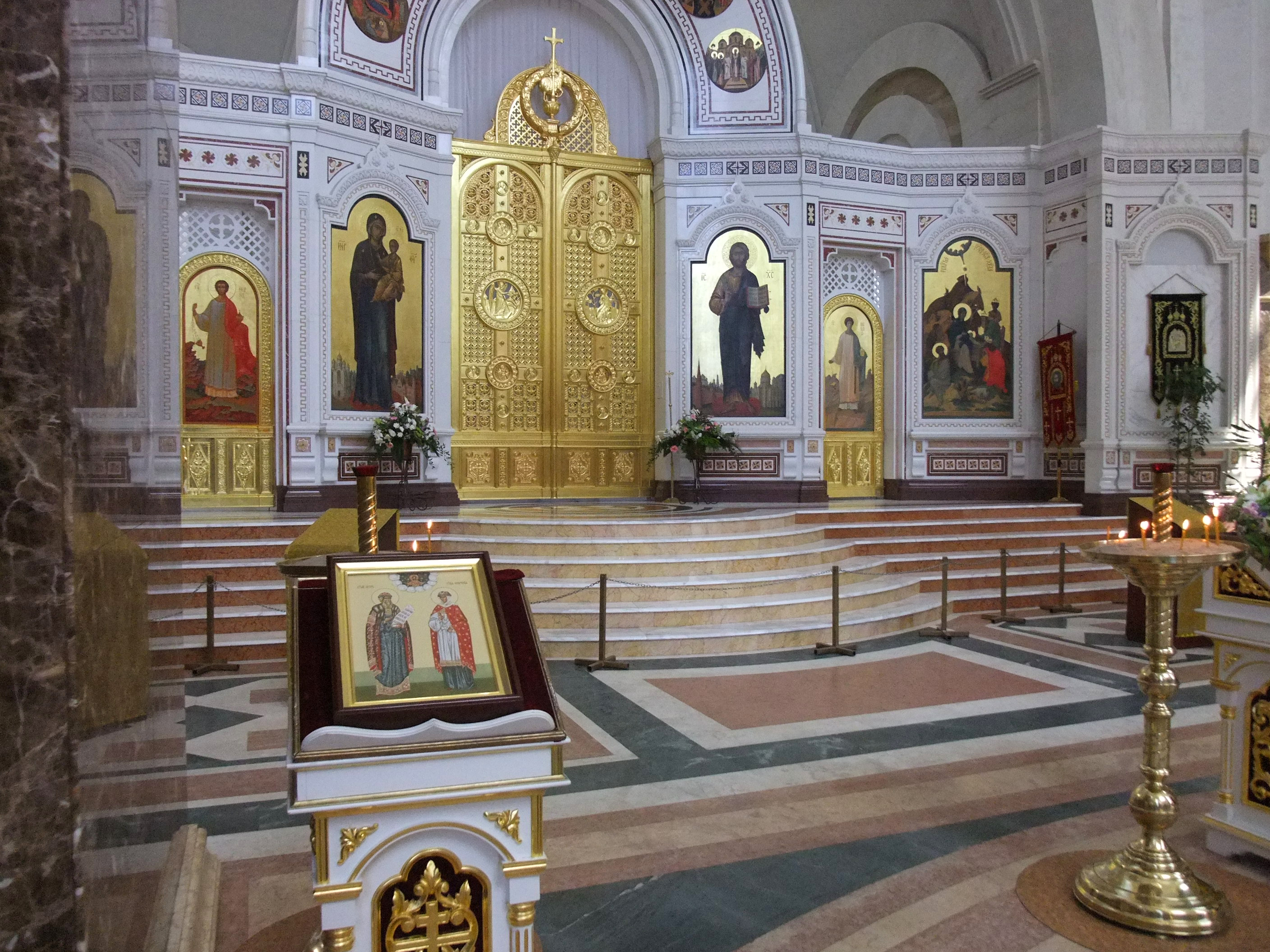
The Cathedral of Christ the Saviour in Kaliningrad. The church's architect is Oleg Kopylov, and it was completed in September 2006.

Some of the region's cultural heritage, most notably the Königsberg Cathedral, was restored in the 1990s, as citizens started to examine the previously ignored German past.

On 12 January 1996, Kaliningrad Oblast and Sverdlovsk Oblast became the first oblasts of Russia to sign a power-sharing treaty with the federal government, granting them autonomy. However, this agreement was abolished on 31 May 2002.

Distribution of Germans in Russia, 2010, demonstrating the higher German presence in the Kaliningrad Oblast compared to other areas in European Russia

After 1991, some ethnic Germans emigrated to the area, such as Volga Germans from other parts of Russia and Kazakhstan. These Germans are overwhelmingly Russian-speaking and as such were rejected for resettlement within Germany under Germany's new rules. A similar migration by Poles from the lands of the former Soviet Union to the Kaliningrad Oblast occurred at this time as well. The situation has begun to change, albeit slowly. Germany, Lithuania, and Poland have renewed contact with Kaliningrad Oblast, through town twinning and other projects. This has helped to promote interest in the history and culture of the East Prussian and Lietuvininkai communities.

In July 2007, Russian First Deputy Prime Minister Sergei Ivanov declared that if US-controlled missile defense systems were deployed in Poland, then nuclear weapons might be deployed in Kaliningrad. On 5 November 2008, Russian president Dmitry Medvedev said that installing missiles in Kaliningrad was almost a certainty. These plans were suspended in January 2009, but implemented in October 2016. In 2011, a long-range Voronezh radar was commissioned to monitor missile launches within about 6,000 km (3,700 mi). The radar is situated in the settlement of Pionersky in Kaliningrad Oblast.

A few months after the 2022 Russian invasion of Ukraine, Lithuania started implementing EU sanctions, which blocked about 50% of the goods being imported into Kaliningrad by rail. Food, medicine, and passenger travel were exempted. Russia protested against the sanctions and announced it would increase shipments by sea. In May 2023, Poland officially adopted a new name for the Kaliningrad region, changing it from "Obwód Kaliningradzki" to "Obwód Królewiecki", Królewiec being the historical Polish name for the city of Kaliningrad. The reason given for the change is that Mikhail Kalinin, a member of the Soviet Politburo, was among those responsible for the Katyn massacre, having co-signed the order to murder thousands of Polish prisoners of war.

== Geography ==
Map of Kaliningrad Oblast

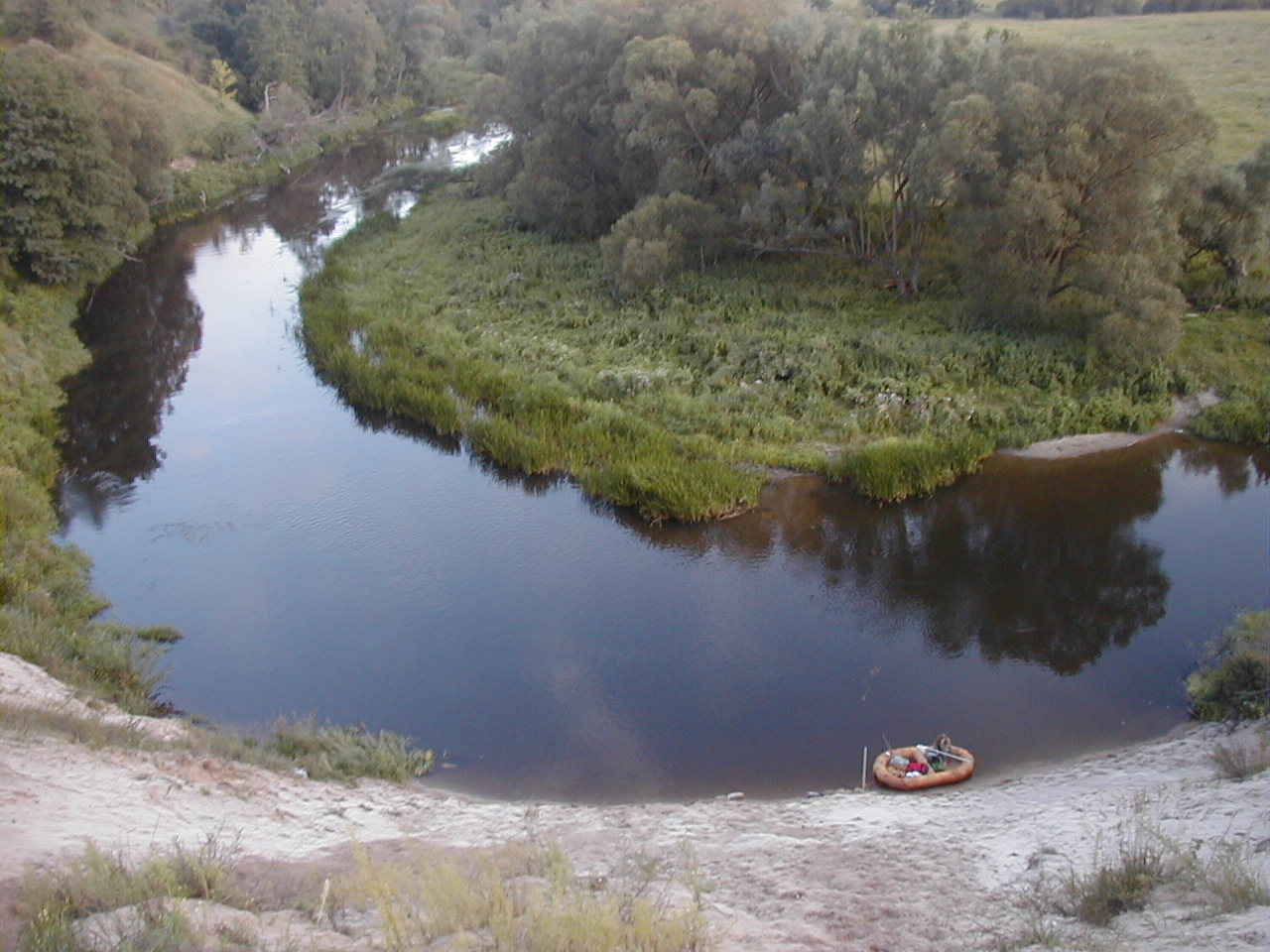
Angrapa River

Kaliningrad is the only Russian Baltic Sea port that is ice-free all year and hence plays an important role in the maintenance of the country's Baltic Fleet.

The oblast is mainly flat, as the highest point is the 230 m (750 ft) Gora Dozor hill near the tripoint of the Poland–Russia border/Lithuania–Russia border.

As an exclave of Russia, it is surrounded by Poland (Pomeranian and Warmian-Masurian Voivodeships), Lithuania (Klaipėda, Marijampolė, and Tauragė Counties) and the Baltic Sea. It can be considered a semi-exclave because it has sea access. The end of the river Neman forms part of the Lithuania–Russia border.

Notable geographical features include the Curonian Lagoon (shared with Lithuania) and the Vistula Lagoon (shared with Poland). The oblast's largest river is the Pregolya. The river starts as a confluence of the Instruch and the Angrapa and drains into the Baltic Sea through the Vistula Lagoon. Its length, strictly under the name "Pregolya", is 123 km (76 mi); when including the Angrapa, is it 292 km (181 mi) long.

Major cities and towns include:

| | Russian | German † | Lithuanian | Polish † |
|---|---|---|---|---|
| Baltiysk | Балтийск | Pillau | Piliava | Piława |
| Chernyakhovsk | Черняховск | Insterburg | Įsrutis | Wystruć |
| Gusev | Гусев | Gumbinnen | Gumbinė | Gąbin |
| Kaliningrad | Калининград | Königsberg | Karaliaučius | Królewiec |
| Sovetsk | Советск | Tilsit | Tilžė | Tylża |
| Svetly | Све́тлый | Zimmerbude | Cimerbūdė | Buda |

† Pre-1946 (the German-language names were also used in English in this period)

=== Overland transport ===
The Kaliningrad Oblast has no direct land connection with mainland Russia, so overland travel to the rest of Russia requires transit through other countries as seen in the map on the right. One road corridor crosses the Kaliningrad–Lithuania border near Chernyshevskoye and Kybartai, continues through Lithuania towards Vilnius. It enters Belarus at the Medininkai–Kamenny Log crossing before continuing towards Minsk and mainland Russia.

The railway corridor follows a different alignment through Lithuania, passing via Kybartai, Kaunas and Vilnius before crossing the Lithuanian–Belarusian border between the Kena railway station in Lithuania and Gudogai in Belarus. Lithuania’s railway infrastructure manager lists Kybartai–Černyševskoje and Kena–Gudogai among its international railway border connections. Both road and rail transit are subject to border controls and applicable restrictions.

=== Climate ===
The climate of the Kaliningrad Oblast gradually transitions from oceanic to humid continental depending on distance from the Baltic Sea moderation. It remains very mild by Russian standards with winters above freezing without the hot summers associated with the Russian interior on similar latitudes. The local climate is slightly wetter than similar latitudes farther west, but infrequent ice days lead to low snow accumulation regardless.

Climate data for Kaliningrad (1991–2020, extremes 1848–present)
| Month | Jan | Feb | Mar | Apr | May | Jun | Jul | Aug | Sep | Oct | Nov | Dec | Year |
|---|---|---|---|---|---|---|---|---|---|---|---|---|---|
| Record high °C (°F) | 12.7 (54.9) | 16.9 (62.4) | 23.0 (73.4) | 28.5 (83.3) | 30.6 (87.1) | 34.0 (93.2) | 36.3 (97.3) | 36.5 (97.7) | 33.8 (92.8) | 26.4 (79.5) | 19.4 (66.9) | 13.3 (55.9) | 36.5 (97.7) |
| Mean daily maximum °C (°F) | 1.1 (34.0) | 2.1 (35.8) | 6.1 (43.0) | 13.1 (55.6) | 18.2 (64.8) | 21.3 (70.3) | 23.5 (74.3) | 23.3 (73.9) | 18.4 (65.1) | 12.2 (54.0) | 6.2 (43.2) | 2.6 (36.7) | 12.3 (54.1) |
| Daily mean °C (°F) | −1.2 (29.8) | −0.6 (30.9) | 2.4 (36.3) | 7.9 (46.2) | 12.7 (54.9) | 16.1 (61.0) | 18.5 (65.3) | 18.1 (64.6) | 13.5 (56.3) | 8.4 (47.1) | 3.9 (39.0) | 0.4 (32.7) | 8.3 (46.9) |
| Mean daily minimum °C (°F) | −3.5 (25.7) | −3.0 (26.6) | −0.8 (30.6) | 3.4 (38.1) | 7.5 (45.5) | 11.3 (52.3) | 13.9 (57.0) | 13.3 (55.9) | 9.4 (48.9) | 5.2 (41.4) | 1.7 (35.1) | −1.8 (28.8) | 4.7 (40.5) |
| Record low °C (°F) | −32.5 (−26.5) | −33.3 (−27.9) | −21.7 (−7.1) | −5.8 (21.6) | −3.1 (26.4) | 0.7 (33.3) | 4.5 (40.1) | 1.6 (34.9) | −2.0 (28.4) | −11.1 (12.0) | −18.7 (−1.7) | −25.6 (−14.1) | −33.3 (−27.9) |
| Average precipitation mm (inches) | 68 (2.7) | 54 (2.1) | 49 (1.9) | 38 (1.5) | 52 (2.0) | 69 (2.7) | 91 (3.6) | 91 (3.6) | 73 (2.9) | 86 (3.4) | 76 (3.0) | 69 (2.7) | 816 (32.1) |
| Average extreme snow depth cm (inches) | 7 (2.8) | 7 (2.8) | 3 (1.2) | 0 (0) | 0 (0) | 0 (0) | 0 (0) | 0 (0) | 0 (0) | 0 (0) | 2 (0.8) | 5 (2.0) | 7 (2.8) |
| Average rainy days | 14 | 13 | 14 | 14 | 14 | 16 | 15 | 16 | 17 | 18 | 18 | 16 | 185 |
| Average snowy days | 15 | 15 | 10 | 3 | 0.1 | 0 | 0 | 0 | 0 | 1 | 7 | 13 | 64 |
| Average relative humidity (%) | 85 | 83 | 78 | 72 | 71 | 74 | 75 | 77 | 81 | 83 | 86 | 87 | 79 |
| Mean monthly sunshine hours | 35 | 61 | 120 | 171 | 253 | 264 | 257 | 228 | 158 | 96 | 38 | 26 | 1,707 |
Source 1: Pogoda.ru.net
Source 2: NOAA (sun 1961–1990)

== Politics ==
The current Governor of Kaliningrad Oblast is Alexey Besprozvannykh.

The region's legislative body is the 40-seat Kaliningrad Oblast Duma.

== Demographics ==
Historical population
| Year | Pop. | ±% |
|---|---|---|
| 1959 | 610,885 | — |
| 1970 | 731,936 | +19.8% |
| 1979 | 806,864 | +10.2% |
| 1989 | 871,283 | +8.0% |
| 2002 | 955,281 | +9.6% |
| 2010 | 941,873 | −1.4% |
| 2021 | 1,029,966 | +9.4% |
Source: Census data

=== Population ===
As of the 2021 census, the population of the oblast was 1,027,678. Earlier censuses recorded a population of 955,281 in 2002 and 871,283 in 1989.

=== Settlements ===
Largest cities or towns in Kaliningrad Oblast 2021 Russian Census
| Name | Administrative division | Pop. | Image |
|---|---|---|---|
| Kaliningrad | City of oblast significance of Kaliningrad | 498,260 | |
| Chernyakhovsk | Chernyakhovsky District | 39,126 | |
| Sovetsk | Town of oblast significance of Sovetsk | 38,514 | |
| Baltiysk | Baltiysky District | 33,946 | |
| Gusev | Gusevsky District | 28,177 | |
| Svetly | Town of oblast significance of Svetly | 21,441 | |
| Guryevsk | Guryevsky District | 19,670 | |
| Zelenogradsk | Zelenogradsky District | 17,296 | |
| Svetlogorsk | Svetlogorsky District | 16,099 | |
| Gvardeysk | Gvardeysky District | 13,353 | |

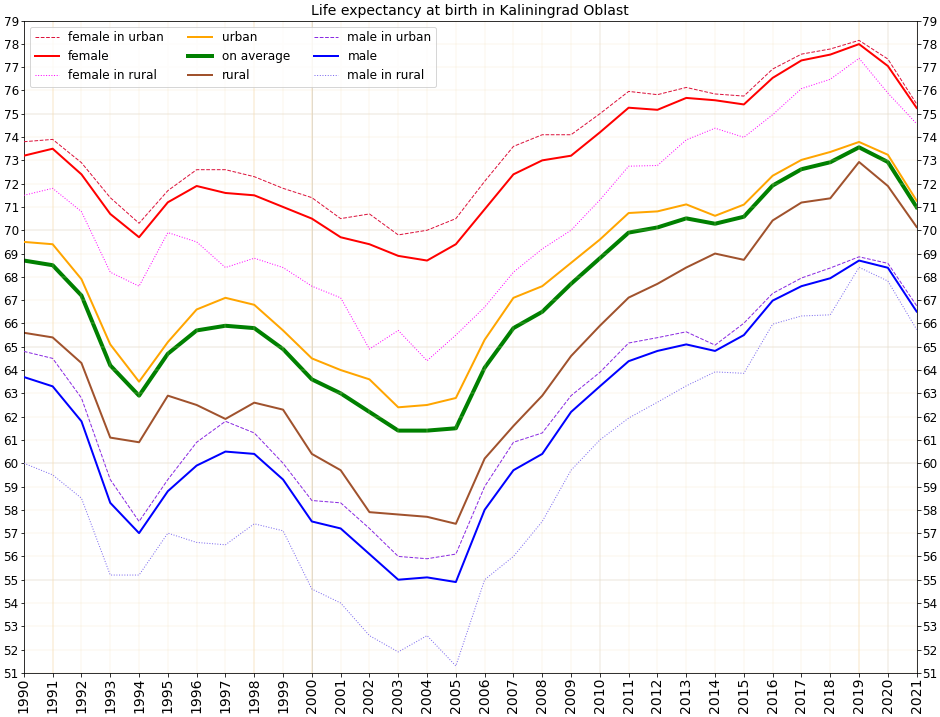
Life expectancy at birth in Kaliningrad Oblast

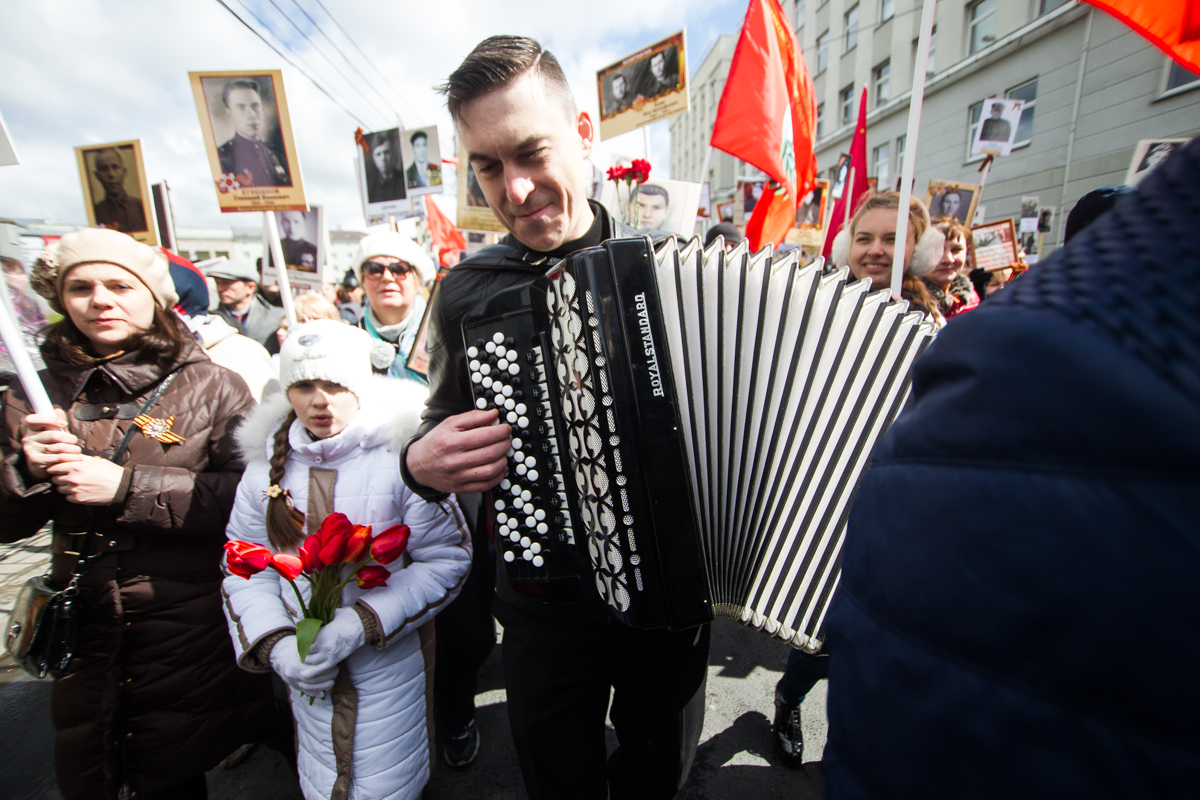
Kaliningrad's residents taking part in the "Immortal Regiment", carrying portraits of their ancestors who fought in World War II.

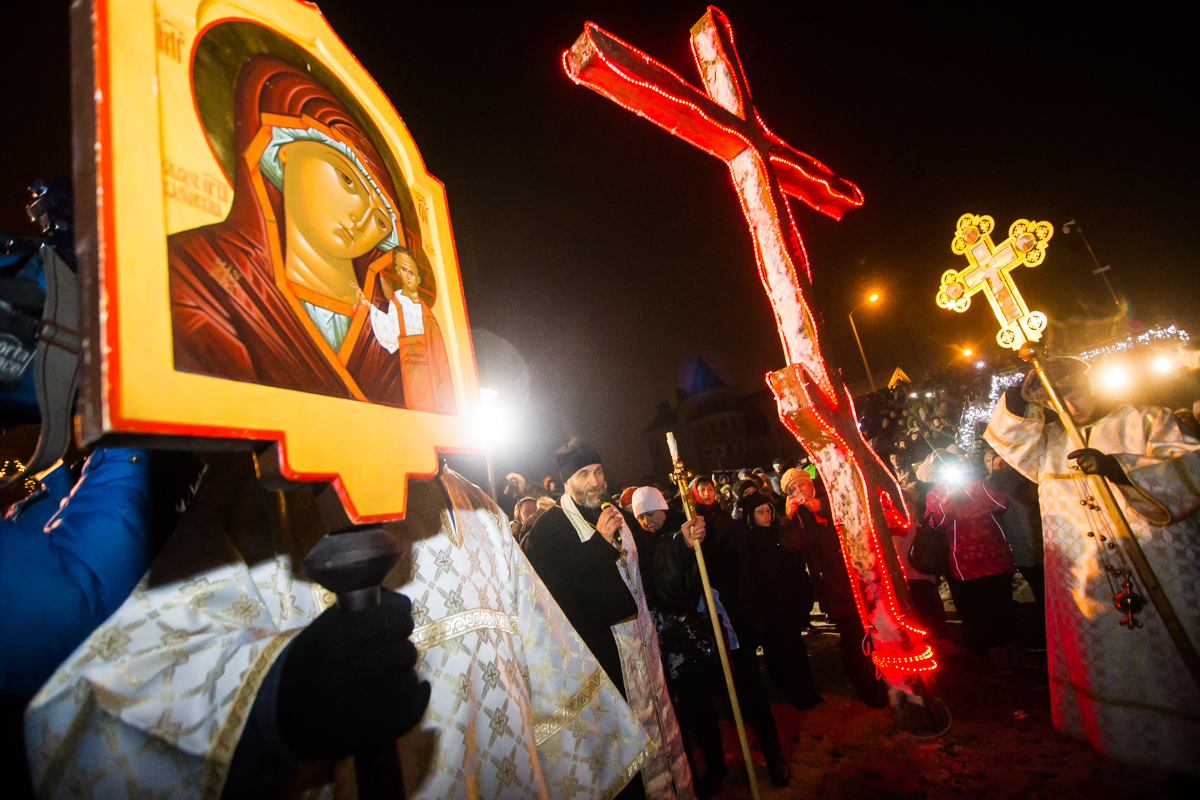
Epiphany bathing in Kaliningrad

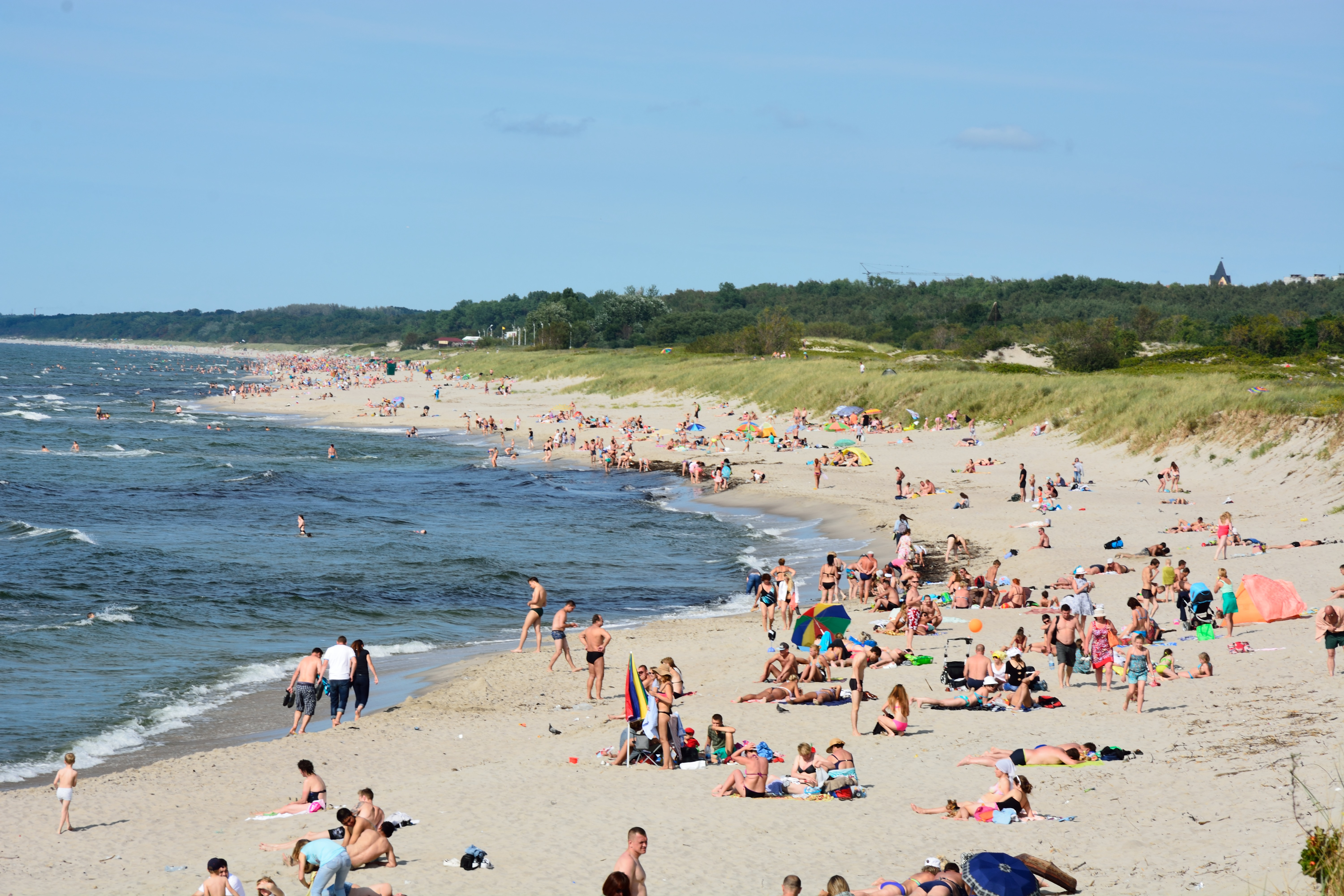
People on the beach near Baltiysk

=== Ethnic groups ===
According to the 2021 census, the ethnic composition of the oblast was as follows:

- 809,546 Russians (78.6%)
- 12,515 Ukrainians (1.2%)
- 11,360 Belarusians (1.1%)
- 8,379 Armenians (0.8%)
- 4,279 Lithuanians (0.4%)
- 4,118 Germans (0.4%)
- 3,250 Tatars (0.3%)
- 2,581 Uzbeks (0.3%)
- 2,555 Azeris (0.2%)
- 1,402 Poles (0.1%)
- 1,015 Tajiks (0.1%)
- 25,706 others (2.5%)
- 143,260 people (or 13.9% of the population) did not state their ethnicity

| Census | 1959 | 1970 | 1979 | 1989 | 2002 | 2010 | 2021 |
|---|---|---|---|---|---|---|---|
| Russians | 473,861 (77.6%) | 564,469 (77.1%) | 632,717 (78.3%) | 683,563 (78.5%) | 786,885 (82.4%) | 772,534 (86.4%) | 809,546 (78.6%) |
| Ukrainians | 35,717 (5.8%) | 48 044 (6.6%) | 54,656 (6.8%) | 62,750 (7.2%) | 47,229 (4.9%) | 32,771 (3.7%) | 12,515 (1.2%) |
| Belarusians | 57,178 (9.4%) | 68,808 (9.4%) | 72,465 (9.0%) | 73,926 (8.5%) | 50,748 (5.3%) | 32,497 (3.6%) | 11,360 (1.1%) |
| Lithuanians | 21,262 (3.5%) | 23,376 (3.2%) | 19,647 (2.4%) | 18,116 (2.1%) | 13,937 (1.5%) | 9,769 (1.1%) | 4,279 (0.4%) |

Total fertility rate

Vital statistics for 2024:

- Births: 7,477 (7.3 per 1,000)
- Deaths: 13,016 (12.6 per 1,000)

Total fertility rate (2024):
1.20 children per woman

Life expectancy (2021):
Total: 70.99 years (male: 66.51; female: 75.25)

=== Religion ===
Religion in Kaliningrad Oblast as of 2012 (Sreda Arena Atlas)
| Russian Orthodoxy | 30.9% |
| Other Orthodox | 0.5% |
| Catholic | 1% |
| Other Christians | 1.7% |
| Spiritual but not religious | 34% |
| Atheism and irreligion | 21.6% |
| Other and undeclared | 10.3% |

According to a 2012 survey, 34% of the population of Kaliningrad Oblast declared themselves to be "spiritual but not religious", 30.9% adhered to the Russian Orthodox Church, 22% were atheist, and 11.1% followed other religions or did not answer the question, 1% were unaffiliated generic Christians, and 1% were Roman Catholic.

Until 1945, the region was overwhelmingly Lutheran, with a small number of Roman Catholics and Jews. The state church of Prussia was dominant in the region. Although it had been both Reformed and Lutheran since 1817, there was an overwhelming Lutheran majority and very few Reformed adherents in East Prussia.

== Economy ==
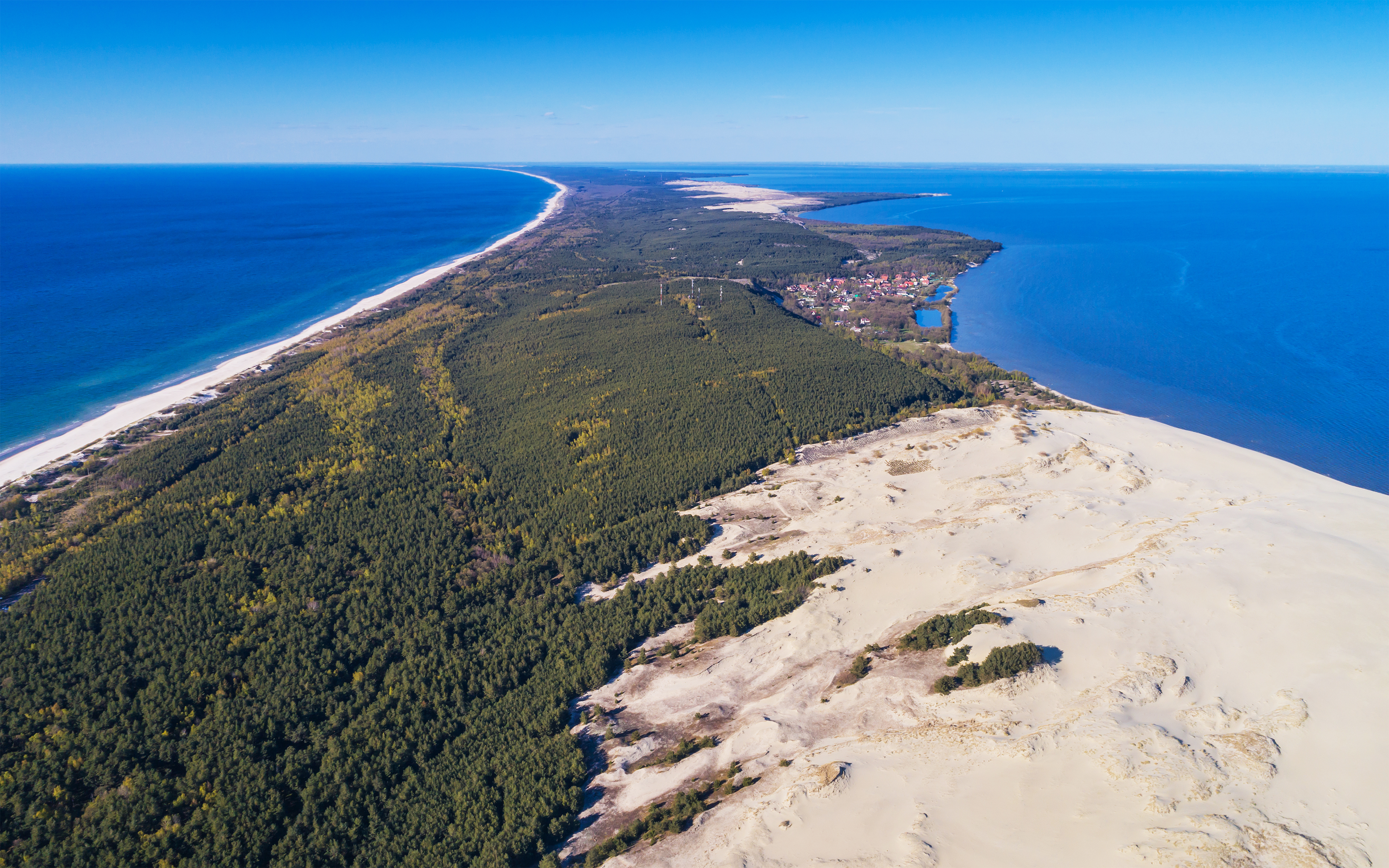
Curonian Spit in Kaliningrad Oblast

In 2022, the gross regional domestic product of Kaliningrad Oblast was ₽738 billion or US$10.6 billion and around US$10,000 per capita.

The existence of the oblast's ice-free port and proximity to the European Union are economic advantages. The oblast’s economy includes engineering, metalworking, and paper-pulp industries. The region has developed its tourism infrastructure and promotes attractions such as the Curonian Spit.

To address the oblast's high rate of unemployment, in 1996 Russian authorities granted the oblast a special economic status that provided tax incentives intended to attract investors. The oblast's economy benefited substantially and boomed. A US$45 million airport terminal was opened. The European Commission provided funds for business projects under its special program for the region. Both economic output and trade with the countries of the EU increased.

=== Industry ===
Car and truck assembly (GM, BMW, Kia, Yuejin by Avtotor) and the production of auto parts are major industries in Kaliningrad Oblast. There are shipbuilding facilities in Kaliningrad and Sovetsk. Food processing is a mature industry in the region, with Miratorg operating a sizeable food processing factory. OKB Fakel, a world leader in the field of Hall thruster development, as well as a leading Russian developer and manufacturer of electric propulsion systems, is based in Neman. The company employs 960 people. General Satellite (GS) is the biggest employer in Gusev city, manufacturing products such as satellite receivers, cardboard packaging, and nanomaterials.

=== Natural resources ===
Kaliningrad Oblast has roughly 90% of global amber deposits. Many Russians refer to the region as "Amber Land" (Russian: Янтарный Край, romanized: Jantarny Krai). Raw amber was previously exported to other countries for processing, but in 2013 the Russian government banned export in order to boost the amber processing industry in Russia.

There are small oil reservoirs beneath the Baltic Sea not far from Kaliningrad's shore. Small-scale offshore exploration started at Kravtsovskoye oilfield in 2004. Poland, Lithuania, and some local NGOs voiced concerns about possible environmental effects.

=== Fishing ===
Fishing is an important regional industry, with big fishing ports in Kaliningrad and Pionersky. There are smaller fishing ports in Svetly and Rybachy.

=== Power generation ===
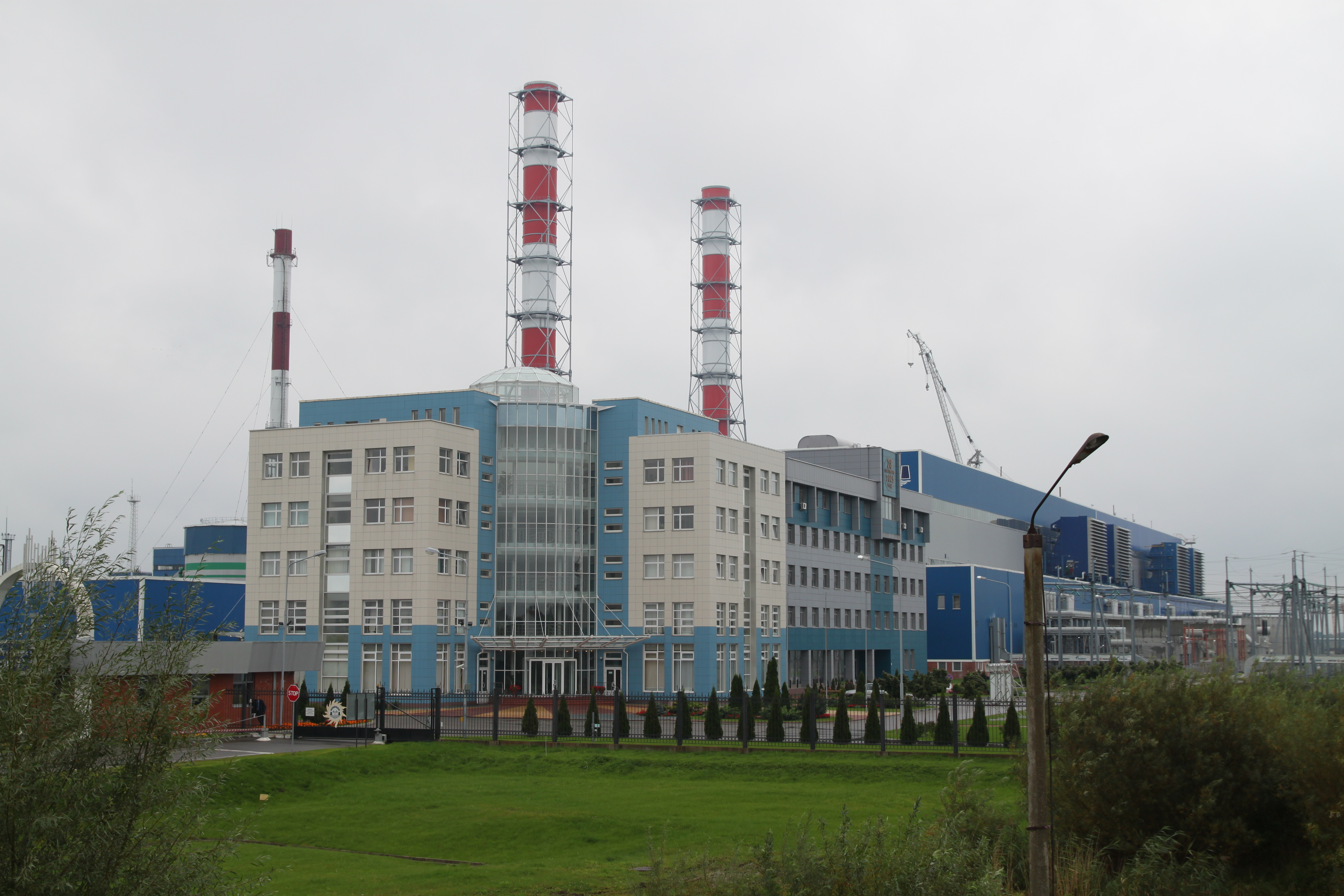
Combined heat and power plant 2

With the desynchronization of the electricity systems of Lithuania, Latvia and Estonia from the Russian UPS synchronous area in February 2025, and their subsequent connection to the Continental Europe Synchronous Area (CESA) via Poland, the Kaliningrad electrical grid became islanded from any other system.

Average yearly power consumption in the Kaliningrad Oblast was 3.5 TWh in 2004, of which local power generation provided just 0.235 TWh. The balance was imported from neighboring countries. A new Kaliningrad power station was built in 2005, providing 50% of the oblast's electricity needs. This station was expanded in 2010, making the oblast independent from electricity imports.

In 2008, planning began for the construction of two nuclear power reactors, with costs estimated at €5 billion (US$8 billion). The project was suspended in May 2013. In 2014, the project was abandoned in response to environmental concerns and lack of support.

LNG from St. Petersburg supplied some of the energy in the Oblast.

== Military ==
Kaliningrad is a strategically important Oblast for the Russian Forces. Before 2022, Kaliningrad’s ground defense was anchored by the 11th Army Corps, which commanded a mix of mechanized infantry, armor, and artillery—totaling over 12,000 dedicated land troops. Due to the war in Ukraine, substantial portions of these elite ground elements and heavy armor were redeployed to the front lines.

=== Chernyakhovsk airbase and station ===
Chernyakhovsk station of Russian Naval Aviation under the Russian Navy's Baltic Fleet is located 4 kilometers southwest of Chernyakhovsk (formerly Insterburg). The station consists of the Chernyakhovsk Air Base (Russian: Черняхо́вск) and the Chernyakhovsk CDAA (Russian: Черняхо́вск круг) wide circularly disposed antenna array (CDAA). It is a medium-sized interceptor airfield, listed as a nuclear bomber base.

OSINT satellite analyses revealed the construction of a gigantic circular antenna array (Wullenweber/CDAA type) with a diameter of approximately 1.6 kilometers. This facility is used for high-precision radio direction finding and potential interception of NATO communications over long distances.

=== Okunewo station ===
Okunewo station is the main station for electronic warfare of the Russian Navy in the Baltic sea region. Okunewo station is located close to the shore and in combination with Baltijsk station, Okunewo is the alleged emitter for GPS-Jamming- und Spoofing-actions, directing to civilan airtraffic and merchant shipps in the region.

== See also ==
- Cultural heritage of Kaliningrad Oblast
- Kaliningrad question
- Kaliningrad Special Region
- List of rural localities in Kaliningrad Oblast
