= Central constituency (Kaliningrad Oblast) =

Russian legislative constituency

Central single-member constituency
- Constituency of the Russian State Duma
- Deputy: Marina Orgeyeva; United Russia
- Federal subject: Kaliningrad Oblast
- Districts: Kaliningrad: Moskovsky, Tsentralny, Ladushkinsky, Mamonovsky, Bagrationovsky, Gvardeysky, part of Guryevsky, Gusevsky, Ozyorsky District, Nesterovsky, Pravdinsky, Chernyakhovsky
- Voters: 417,903 (2026)

Central constituency (No.100 (Note: No.98 in 2016–2026)) (Russian: Центральный) is a Russian legislative constituency in Kaliningrad Oblast. The constituency covers most of Kaliningrad and southern half of Kaliningrad Oblast.

The constituency has been represented since 2021 by United Russia deputy Marina Orgeyeva, former Chairwoman of the Kaliningrad Oblast Duma, who won the open seat, succeeding one-term United Russia incumbent Aleksandr Yaroshuk.

== Boundaries ==
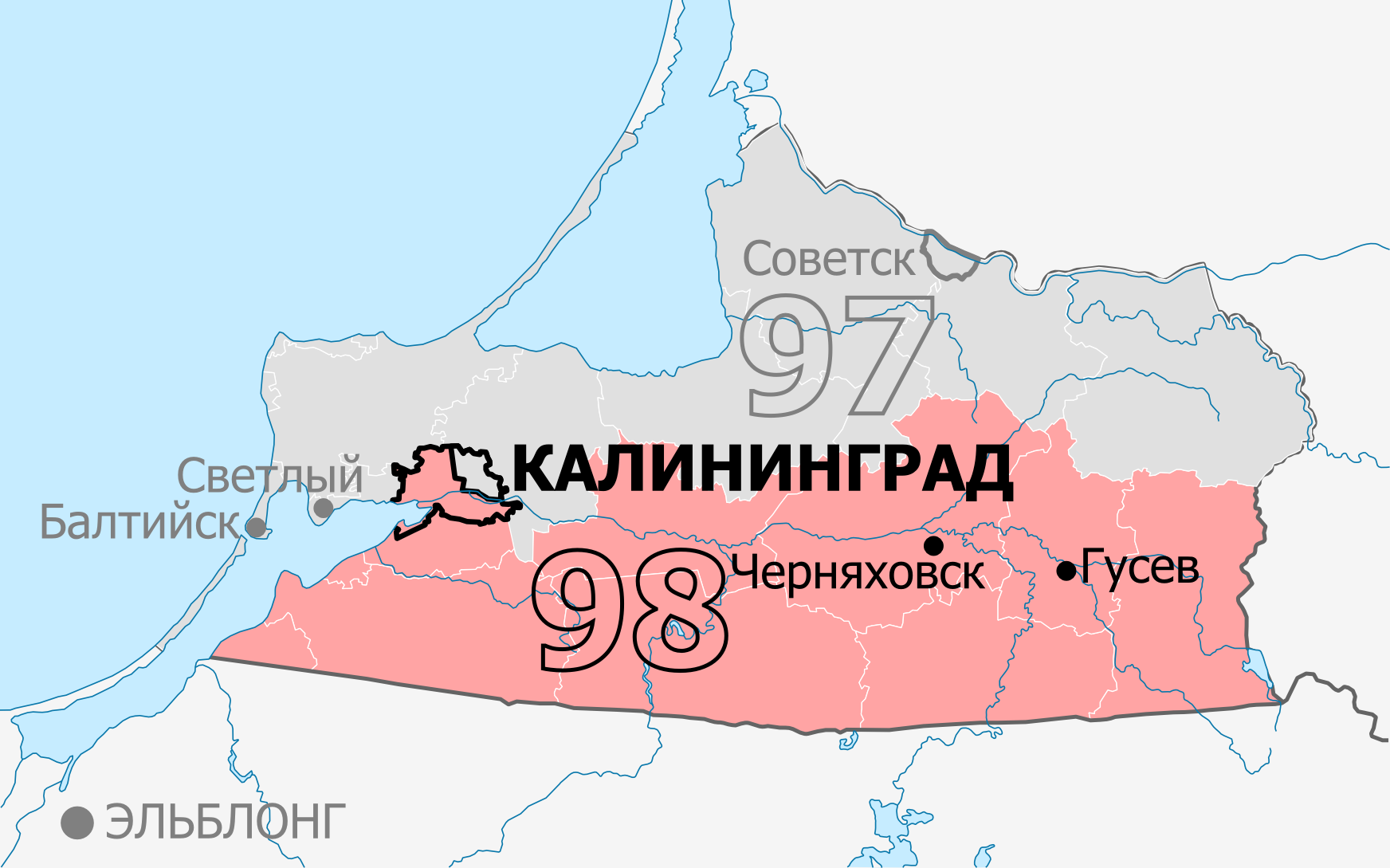
Constituency boundaries from 2016 to 2026

2016–2026: Bagrationovsky District, Chernyakhovsky District, Gvardeysky District, Guryevsky District (Lesnoye, Shosseynoye, Ushakovo, Yablonevka), Gusevsky District, Kaliningrad (Moskovsky, Tsentralny, Ladushkinsky, Mamonovsky), Nesterovsky District, Ozyorsky District, Pravdinsky District
The constituency was created for the 2016 election from half of the former Kaliningrad constituency, taking most of Kaliningrad and southern Kaliningrad Oblast.

2026–present: Bagrationovsky District, Chernyakhovsky District, Gvardeysky District, Guryevsky District (Bugrino, Dorozhnoye, Golubevo, Laskino, Lesnoye, Luzhki, Maloye Lesnoye, Novo-Dorozhny, Novoye Lesnoye, Poddubnoye, Polevoye, Shosseynoye, Svetloye, Tsvetkovo, Ushakovo, Voronovo, Yablonevka), Gusevsky District, Kaliningrad (Moskovsky, Tsentralny, Ladushkinsky, Mamonovsky), Nesterovsky District, Ozyorsky District, Pravdinsky District
After 2025 redistricting the constituency was slightly altered, gaining some rural settlements in Guryevsky District from Kaliningrad constituency.

== Members elected ==
Election	Member	Party
2016	Aleksey Silanov (Note: elected Head of Kaliningrad in April 2018)	United Russia
2018	Aleksandr Yaroshuk	United Russia
2021	Marina Orgeyeva	United Russia
2026	Marina Orgeyeva	United Russia

== Results ==
=== 2016 ===
Summary of the 18 September 2016 Russian legislative election in the Central constituency
Candidate	Party	Votes	%
Aleksey Silanov	United Russia	73,322	40.78%
Yevgeny Mishin	Liberal Democratic Party	19,883	11.06%
Igor Pleshkov	Communist Party	18,965	10.55%
Solomon Ginzburg	Party of Growth	18,101	10.07%
Pavel Fyodorov	A Just Russia	13,538	7.53%
Maksim Pavlenko	Communists of Russia	7,957	4.43%
Lyudmila Poplavskaya	The Greens	7,614	4.24%
Yury Galanin	Rodina	6,483	3.61%
Sergey Malikov	Civic Platform	2,740	1.52%
Total		179,787	100%

=== 2018 ===
Summary of the 9 September 2018 by-election in the Central constituency
Candidate	Party	Votes	%
Aleksandr Yaroshuk	United Russia	32,185	39.87%
Igor Revin	Communist Party	18,206	22.55%
Yevgeny Mishin	Liberal Democratic Party	11,023	13.65%
Olga Kuzemskaya	Party of Pensioners	5,538	6.86%
Konstantin Doroshok	A Just Russia	5,212	6.46%
Aleksandr Orlov	Communists of Russia	4,408	5.46%
Total		80,729	100%

=== 2021 ===
Summary of the 17-19 September 2021 Russian legislative election in the Central constituency
Candidate	Party	Votes	%
Marina Orgeyeva	United Russia	79,639	39.77%
Darya Anuchina	Communist Party	29,685	14.83%
Yevgeny Mishin	Liberal Democratic Party	21,096	10.54%
Yury Shitikov	A Just Russia — For Truth	14,881	7.43%
Tamara Bragina	Party of Pensioners	11,382	5.68%
Yekaterina Semyonova	New People	11,325	5.66%
Natalya Konovalova	Communists of Russia	8,134	4.06%
Dmitry Novik	Rodina	4,880	2.44%
Igor Pleshkov	Yabloko	4,405	2.20%
Vladimir Timofeyev	Party of Freedom and Justice	3,712	1.85%
Total		200,226	100%

=== 2026 ===
Summary of the 18-20 September 2026 Russian legislative election in the Central constituency
Candidate	Party	Votes	%
Marina Orgeyeva (incumbent)	United Russia	93,906	46.59%
Yevgeny Mishin	Liberal Democratic Party	19,606	9.73%
Vladislav Ryabtsev	Communist Party	18,145	9.00%
Andrey Aleshkin	New People	15,618	7.75%
Roman Morozov	Yabloko	14,869	7.38%
Yury Shitikov	A Just Russia	11,438	5.68%
Yelena Lyubimova	Party of Pensioners	8,360	4.15%
Aleksey Kolobov	Communists of Russia	7,438	3.69%
Olga Solovyeva	The Greens	2,740	1.36%
Artyom Cherepanov	Rodina	2,310	1.15%
Total		201,538	100%

== See also ==
- Politics of Kaliningrad Oblast
