= Kaliningrad constituency =

Russian legislative constituency

Kaliningrad single-member constituency
- Constituency of the Russian State Duma
- Deputy: Andrey Kozlov; United Russia
- Federal subject: Kaliningrad Oblast
- Districts: Baltiysk, most of Guryevsky, Kaliningrad (Leningradsky), Krasnoznamensky, Nemansky, Pionersky, Polessky, Slavsky, Sovetsk, Svetlogorsk, Svetly, Yantarny, Zelenogradsky
- Voters: 421,363 (2026)

The Kaliningrad constituency (No.99 (Note: No.85 in 1993-1995 and 2003-2007, No.84 in 1995-2003, No.97 in 2016–2026)) is a Russian legislative constituency in Kaliningrad Oblast. The constituency covers part of Kaliningrad and northern half of Kaliningrad Oblast.

The constituency has been represented since 2026 by United Russia deputy Andrey Kozlov, retired FSB colonel and Hero of Russia, who won the open seat, succeeding two-term United Russia incumbent Andrey Kolesnik.

== Boundaries ==
1993–2007: Bagrationovsky District, Baltiysk, Chernyakhovsky District, Guryevsky District, Gusevsky District, Gvardeysky District, Kaliningrad, Krasnoznamensky District, Nemansky District, Nesterovsky District, Ozyorsky District, Pionersky, Polessky District, Pravdinsky District, Slavsky District, Sovetsk, Svetlogorsk, Svetly, Yantarny, Zelenogradsky District
The constituency covered the entire territory of Kaliningrad Oblast.

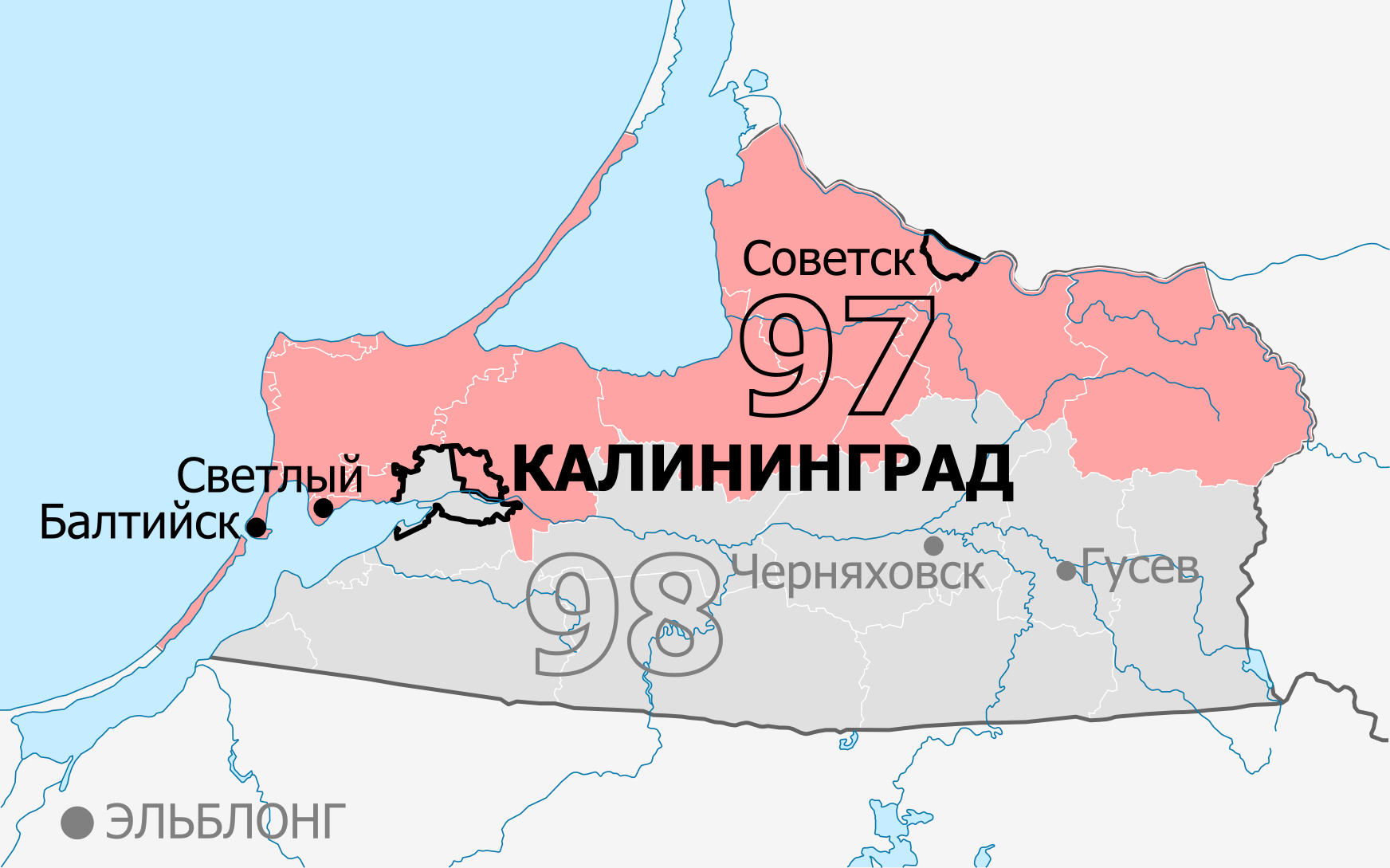
Constituency boundaries from 2016 to 2026

2016–2026: Baltiysk, Guryevsky District (except Lesnoye, Shosseynoye, Ushakovo, Yablonevka), Kaliningrad (Leningradsky), Krasnoznamensky District, Nemansky District, Pionersky, Polessky District, Slavsky, Sovetsk, Svetlogorsk, Svetly, Yantarny, Zelenogradsky District
The constituency was re-created for the 2016 election and retained only its northern half, including part of Kaliningrad, losing the rest to new Central constituency.

2026–present: Baltiysk, Guryevsky District (except Bugrino, Dorozhnoye, Golubevo, Laskino, Lesnoye, Luzhki, Maloye Lesnoye, Novo-Dorozhny, Novoye Lesnoye, Poddubnoye, Polevoye, Shosseynoye, Svetloye, Tsvetkovo, Ushakovo, Voronovo, Yablonevka), Kaliningrad (Leningradsky), Krasnoznamensky District, Nemansky District, Pionersky, Polessky District, Slavsky, Sovetsk, Svetlogorsk, Svetly, Yantarny, Zelenogradsky District
After 2025 redistricting the constituency was slightly altered, losing some rural settlements in Guryevsky District to Central constituency.

== Members elected ==
Election	Member	Party
1993	Yury Voyevoda	Russian Democratic Reform Movement
1995	Vladimir Nikitin	Independent
1999	Vladimir Nikitin	Independent
2003	Vladimir Nikitin	Independent
2007	Proportional representation - no election by constituency	
2011	Proportional representation - no election by constituency	
2016	Aleksandr Pyatikop	United Russia
2021	Andrey Kolesnik	United Russia
2026	Andrey Kozlov	United Russia

== Election results ==
=== 1993 ===
Summary of the 12 December 1993 Russian legislative election in the Kaliningrad constituency
Candidate	Party	Votes	%
Yury Voyevoda	Russian Democratic Reform Movement	78,729	20.31%
Oleg Gordov	Choice of Russia	77,783	20.07%
Gennady Vatutin	Agrarian Party	60,657	15.65%
Yefim Dovzhenko	Communist Party	37,036	9.56%
Yakov Kuzin	Civic Union	20,089	5.18%
against all		78,593	20.28%
Total		387,577	100%

=== 1995 ===
Summary of the 17 December 1995 Russian legislative election in the Kaliningrad constituency
Candidate	Party	Votes	%
Vladimir Nikitin	Independent	87,053	19.20%
Yury Voyevoda (incumbent)	Independent	63,851	14.08%
Nikolay Tulayev	Our Home – Russia	43,177	9.52%
Aleksandr Zhenatov	Communist Party	40,576	8.95%
Gennady Vatutin	Agrarian Party	22,643	4.99%
Dmitry Slepokurov	Yabloko	21,755	4.80%
Aleksandr Orlov	My Fatherland	18,392	4.06%
Vladimir Kuzmenok	Trade Unions and Industrialists – Union of Labour	18,045	3.98%
Boris Shushkin	Congress of Russian Communities	13,911	3.07%
Aleksandr Savostikov	Independent	12,430	2.74%
Valery Starikov	Independent	10,607	2.34%
Leonid Romadin	Independent	8,043	1.77%
Sergey Zhuravsky	Independent	5,986	1.32%
Vladimir Vysokovsky	Forward, Russia!	5,764	1.27%
Valery Krashenko	Independent	5,485	1.21%
Gennady Snustikov	Independent	3,860	0.85%
Vyacheslav Orlenok	Independent	3,778	0.83%
against all		56,505	12.46%
Total		453,419	100%

=== 1999 ===
Summary of the 19 December 1999 Russian legislative election in the Kaliningrad constituency
Candidate	Party	Votes	%
Vladimir Nikitin (incumbent)	Independent	120,879	29.16%
Sergey Medvedev	Independent	66,206	15.97%
Andrey Krayny	Independent	41,458	10.00%
Sergey Kozlov	Fatherland – All Russia	26,568	6.41%
Vitaly Lednik	Unity	25,091	6.05%
Vladimir Shumeyko	Independent	20,060	4.84%
Nikolay Tulayev	Independent	14,559	3.51%
Valery Seleznev	Liberal Democratic Party	12,471	3.01%
Galina Fomenko	Women of Russia	11,687	2.82%
Dmitry Slepokurov	Yabloko	9,470	2.28%
Vladimir Popov	Independent	8,016	1.93%
Viktor Kazakov	Andrey Nikolayev and Svyatoslav Fyodorov Bloc	4,283	1.03%
Andrey Kubanov	Independent	2,712	0.65%
Yury Voyevoda	Independent	2,613	0.63%
Pavel Doronin	Our Home – Russia	2,433	0.59%
Vladimir Voblikov	Congress of Russian Communities-Yury Boldyrev Movement	2,361	0.57%
Vyacheslav Bogdanov	Spiritual Heritage	1,961	0.47%
Valery Sychev	Independent	723	0.17%
against all		33,903	8.18%
Total		414,491	100%

=== 2003 ===
Results by district: Vladimir Nikitin: 20–30%; Aleksandr Datsyshin: 20–30% 30–40% 40–50%

Summary of the 7 December 2003 Russian legislative election in the Kaliningrad constituency
Candidate	Party	Votes	%
Vladimir Nikitin (incumbent)	Independent	76,197	22.10%
Aleksandr Datsyshin	United Russia	64,026	18.57%
Vitautas Lopata	Democratic Party	49,988	14.50%
Yury Shitikov	Independent	27,018	7.84%
Valery Seleznev	Liberal Democratic Party	20,566	5.97%
Irina Kuznetsova	Party of Russia's Rebirth-Russian Party of Life	18,697	5.42%
Lyudmila Zelinskaya	Union of Right Forces	14,553	4.22%
Vasily Kovalchuk	Yabloko	9,203	2.67%
Aleksey Yushenkov	New Course — Automobile Russia	3,335	0.97%
Yakov Kuzin	Development of Enterprise	2,246	0.65%
Aleksey Zernov	United Russian Party Rus'	2,057	0.60%
against all		50,655	14.69%
Total		345,137	100%

=== 2016 ===
Summary of the 18 September 2016 Russian legislative election in the Kaliningrad constituency
Candidate	Party	Votes	%
Aleksandr Pyatikop	United Russia	66,994	38.95%
Igor Revin	Communist Party	23,672	13.76%
Yegor Anisimov	Liberal Democratic Party	22,553	13.11%
Natalya Masyanova	A Just Russia	14,173	8.24%
Mikhail Chesalin	Patriots of Russia	10,913	6.34%
Aleksandr Orlov	Communists of Russia	8,302	4.83%
Dmitry Potapenko	Party of Growth	7,147	4.16%
Dmitry Novik	Rodina	4,801	2.79%
Vitaly Goncharov	The Greens	3,963	2.30%
Total		172,009	100%

=== 2021 ===
Summary of the 17-19 September 2021 Russian legislative election in the Kaliningrad constituency
Candidate	Party	Votes	%
Andrey Kolesnik	United Russia	71,987	37.77%
Maksim Bulka	Communist Party	35,138	18.44%
Semyon Kurbatov	Liberal Democratic Party	20,597	10.81%
Aleksandr Konstantinov	A Just Russia — For Truth	15,504	8.13%
Igor Revin	Party of Pensioners	14,669	7.70%
Vitautas Lopata	Yabloko	10,868	5.70%
Gennady Ustimenko	Russian Party of Freedom and Justice	5,536	2.90%
Andrey Raudsep	Rodina	4,160	2.18%
Total		249,565	100%

=== 2026 ===
Summary of the 18-20 September 2026 Russian legislative election in the Kaliningrad constituency
Candidate	Party	Votes	%
Andrey Kozlov	United Russia	103,410	46.39%
Maksim Bulanov	Communist Party	37,138	16.66%
Viktor Sidorov	New People	23,962	10.75%
Pavel Fyodorov	A Just Russia	17,490	7.85%
Leonid Yuditsky	Liberal Democratic Party	15,163	6.80%
Dmitry Chizhov	Party of Pensioners	12,826	5.75%
Vladislav Lapshin	The Greens	5,525	2.48%
Total		222,902	100%
