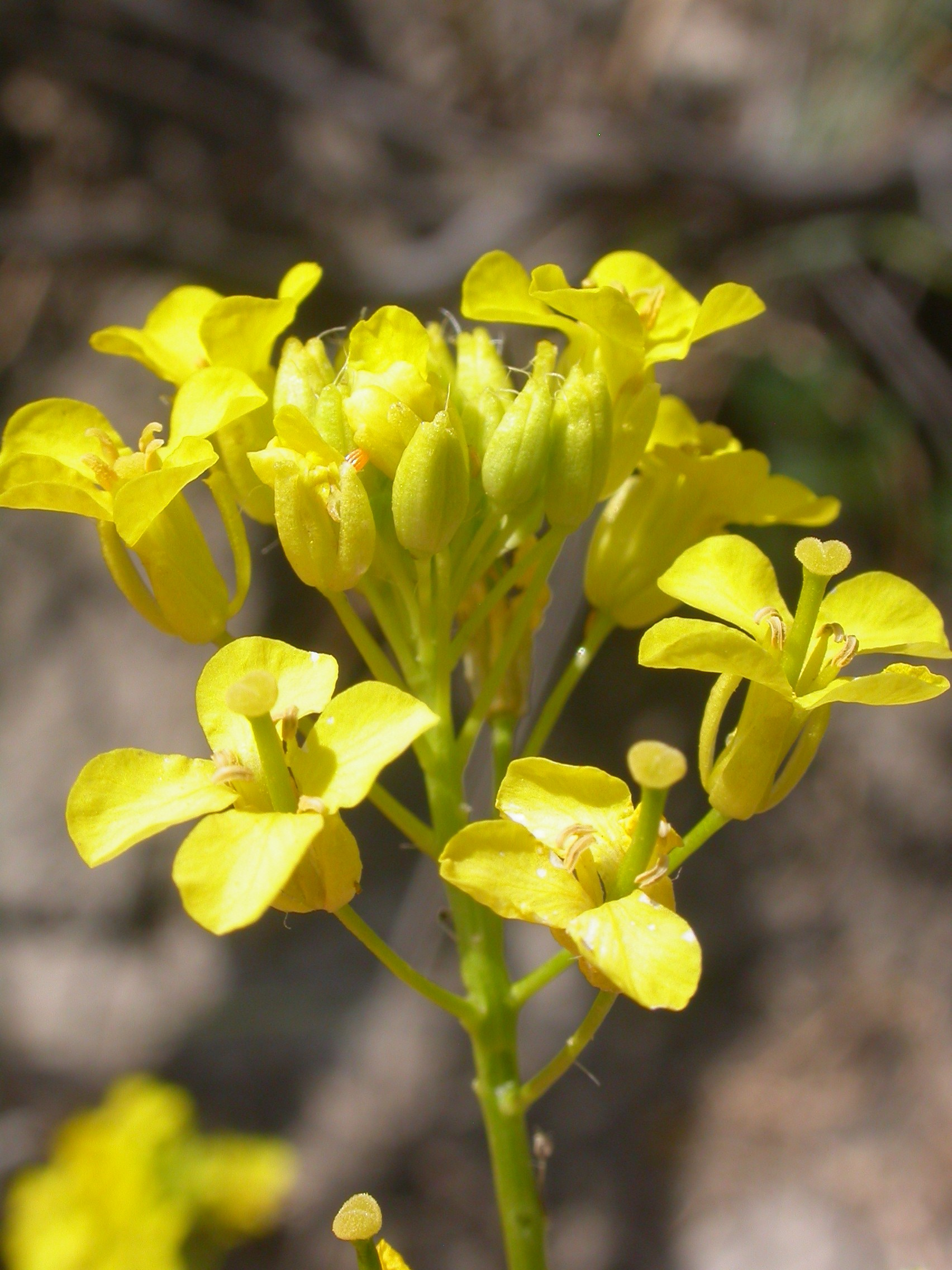

Scientific classification
- Kingdom: Plantae
- Clade: Tracheophytes
- Clade: Angiosperms
- Clade: Eudicots
- Clade: Rosids
- Order: Brassicales
- Family: Brassicaceae
- Genus: Sisymbrium
- Species: S. loeselii

Binomial name
- Sisymbrium loeselii L.

= Sisymbrium loeselii =

Species of flowering plant

Sisymbrium loeselii is a species of flowering plant in the family Brassicaceae known by several common names, including small tumbleweed mustard, false London-rocket, and tall hedge mustard. It is native to Eurasia, and it is known on other continents as an introduced species and in some areas a common roadside weed.

It is an annual herb producing a hairy, erect stem which can exceed a meter in height. The leaf blades are divided into triangular, lance-shaped, and toothed linear lobes, and are borne on petioles. The top of the stem is occupied by a raceme of flowers with bright yellow petals each measuring just under a centimeter long. The fruit is a silique up to 3.5 centimeters in length containing tiny seeds.

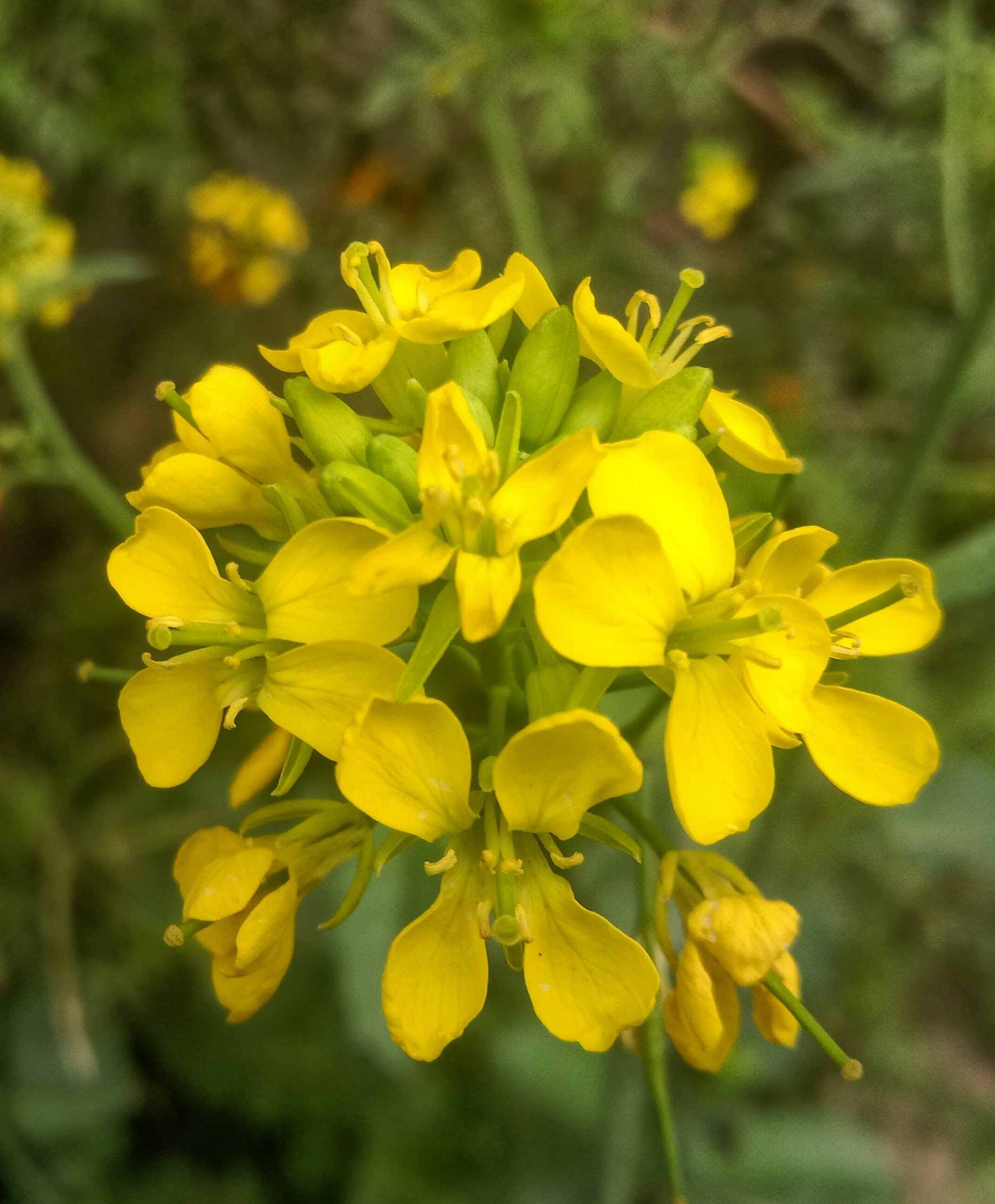
Closeup of flowers, in West Bengal, India.

This plant is allelopathic against other species growing around it. It produces chemicals that inhibit the germination of seeds of other species, including bluebunch wheatgrass (Pseudoroegneria spicata) and Idaho fescue (Festuca idahoensis). It also inhibits arbuscular mycorrhizal fungus species, such as Glomus intraradices.

The species is named for German botanist Johannes Loesel.

== Uses ==
The leaves are spicy enough to make wasabi but can also be mixed into salads and other dishes.
