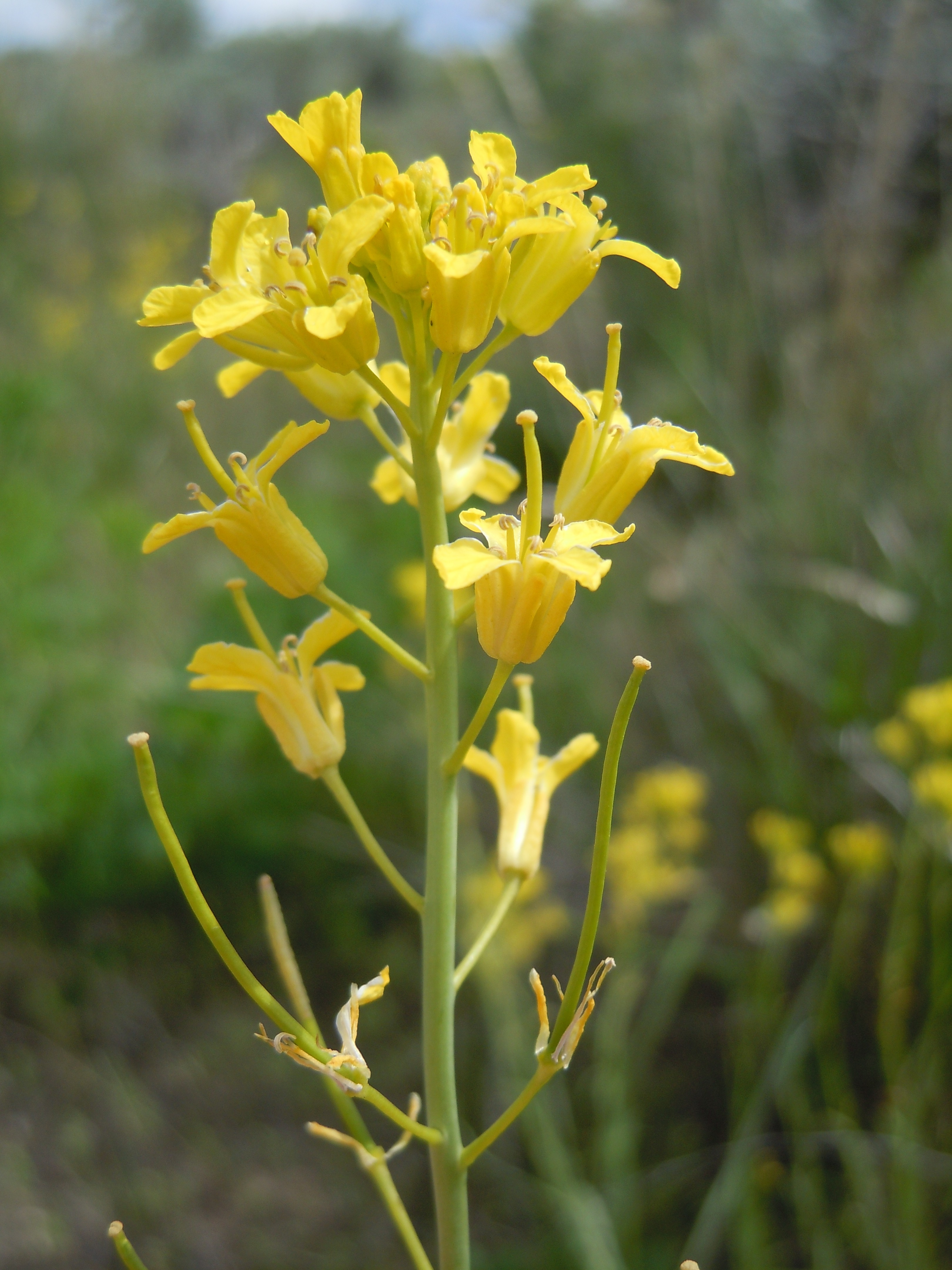

Scientific classification
- Kingdom: Plantae
- Clade: Tracheophytes
- Clade: Angiosperms
- Clade: Eudicots
- Clade: Rosids
- Order: Brassicales
- Family: Brassicaceae
- Genus: Sisymbrium
- Species: S. linifolium

Binomial name
- Sisymbrium linifolium (Nutt.) Nutt.

Synonyms
- Erysimum glaberrimum Hook. & Arn.; Erysimum linifolium (Nutt.) M.E.Jones, nom. illeg.; Hesperis linifolia (Nutt.) Kuntze; Nasturtium linifolium Nutt.; Nasturtium pumilum Nutt., nom. illeg.; Schoenocrambe decumbens Rydb.; Schoenocrambe linifolia (Nutt.) Greene; Schoenocrambe pinnata Greene; Schoenocrambe pygmaea (Nutt.) Greene; Sisymbrium decumbens (Rydb.) Blank.; Sisymbrium junceum Hook., nom. illeg.; Sisymbrium pygmaeum Nutt.

= Sisymbrium linifolium =

Species of flowering plant

Sisymbrium linifolium, synonyms including Schoenocrambe linifolia, is a species of flowering plant in the mustard family, known by the common names flaxleaf plainsmustard, skeleton mustard, and Salmon River plains-mustard. It is native to western North America, where it can be found from British Columbia east of the Cascade Range to Saskatchewan in Canada and south to Arizona and New Mexico in the United States. An "extremely common" plant, it is most abundant in the Columbia, Great, and Colorado Basins.

This perennial plant produces erect stems up to half a meter tall from a caudex. It grows from a long, deep rhizome. The leaves are linear, sometimes divided toward the base of the plant. The fruit is a slender silique up to 6 centimeters (2.4 in) long. It reproduces by seed and by resprouting from the rhizome and caudex. The latter process helps it recover quickly from wildfire.

This plant occurs in many types of habitat, including salt-desert shrub, sagebrush, pinyon-juniper woodland, mountain shrub, and habitat dominated by Ponderosa pine (Pinus ponderosa), and trembling aspen (Populus tremuloides). It is the most common forb in a number of regions, including a pinyon-sagebrush transition in northeastern Utah and the grasslands of the Snake River Plain.

== Uses ==
The leaves are spicy enough to make wasabi but can also be mixed into salads and other dishes.
