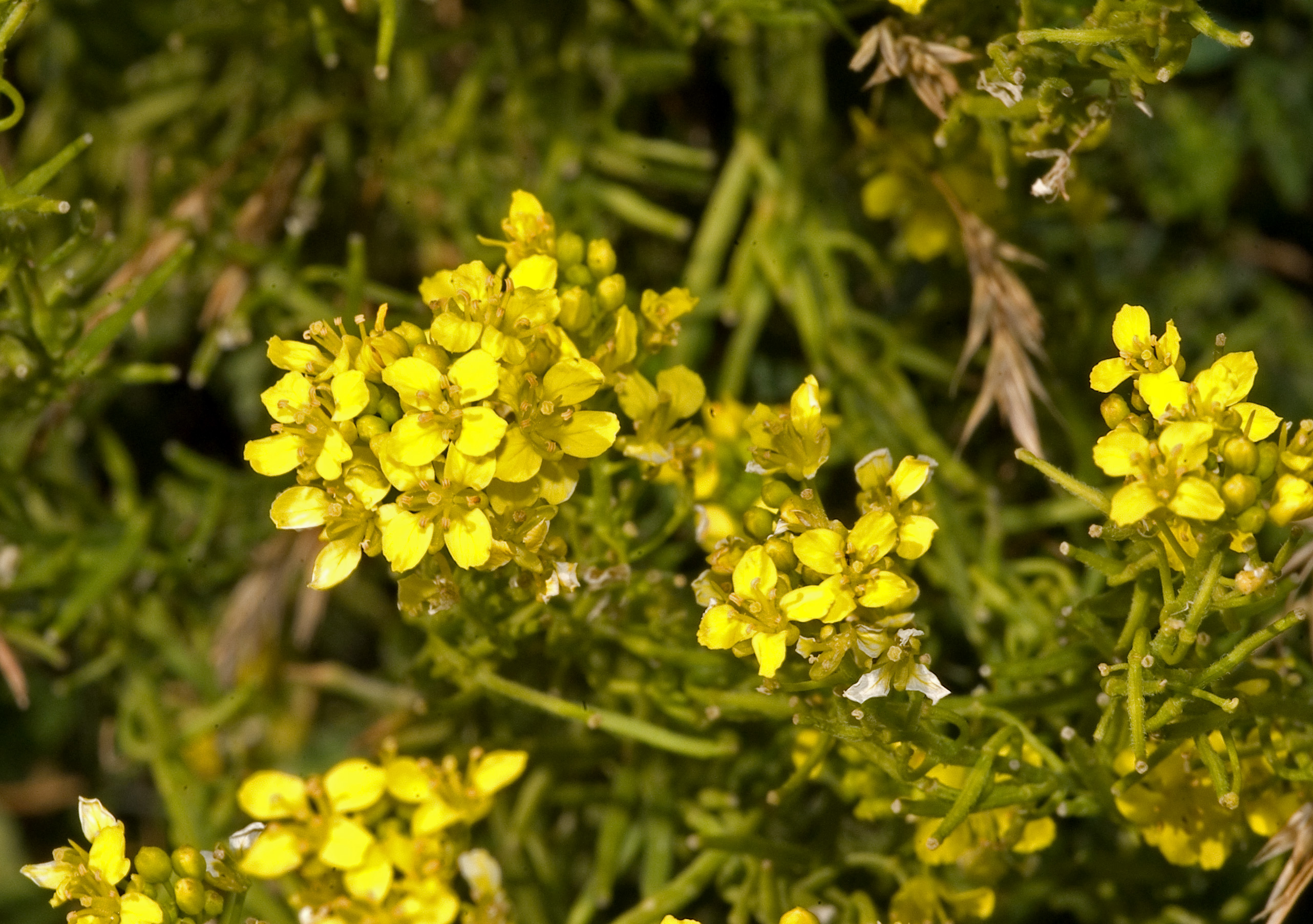

Scientific classification
- Kingdom: Plantae
- Clade: Tracheophytes
- Clade: Angiosperms
- Clade: Eudicots
- Clade: Rosids
- Order: Brassicales
- Family: Brassicaceae
- Genus: Sisymbrium
- Species: S. orientale

Binomial name
- Sisymbrium orientale L.

= Sisymbrium orientale =

Species of flowering plant

Sisymbrium orientale is a species of flowering plant in the family Brassicaceae known by the common names Indian hedgemustard and eastern rocket. It is native to Europe, Asia, and North Africa, and it can be found throughout much of the temperate world as an introduced species and in some areas a common roadside weed. It is an annual herb producing a hairy, branching stem up to about 30 centimeters tall. The basal leaves are divided into deep lobes or toothed leaflets. Leaves higher on the stem have lance-shaped blades with small separate lobes near the base. The top of the stem is occupied by a raceme of flowers with light yellow petals each measuring up to a centimeter long. The fruit is a silique which can be up to 10 centimeters long.
