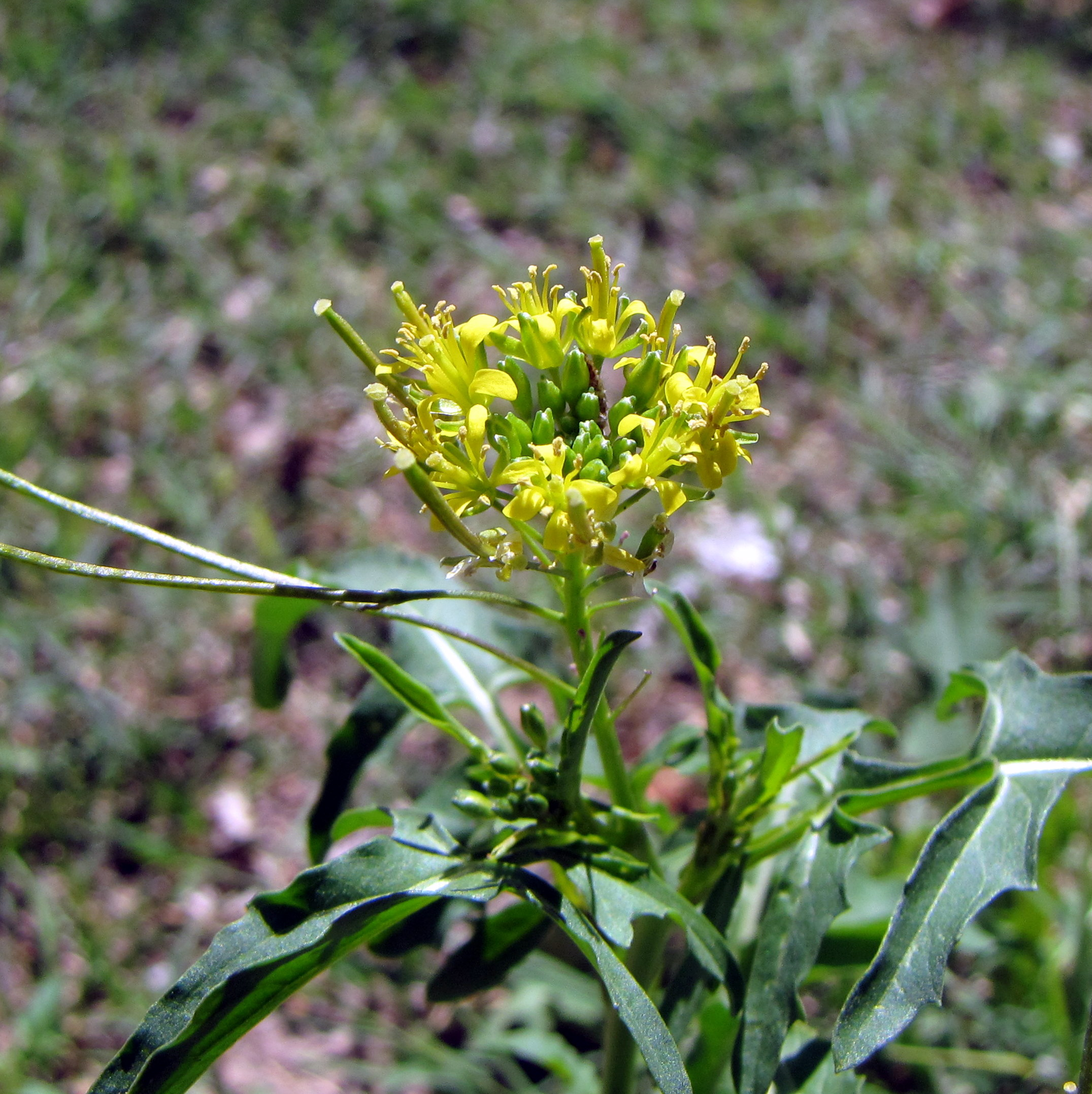

Conservation status
- Least Concern (IUCN 3.1)

Scientific classification
- Kingdom: Plantae
- Clade: Tracheophytes
- Clade: Angiosperms
- Clade: Eudicots
- Clade: Rosids
- Order: Brassicales
- Family: Brassicaceae
- Genus: Sisymbrium
- Species: S. irio

Binomial name
- Sisymbrium irio L.

= Sisymbrium irio =

Species of flowering plant

Sisymbrium irio, London rocket, is a flowering plant in the cabbage family. Its English common name originated when it flourished after the Great Fire of London in 1666, although it is not native to Britain and it does not tend to persist there.

It is native to the Middle East, north Africa and southern Europe, and which has spread widely around the world as an invasive plant of dry, disturbed land in towns, deserts and farmland. It has traditionally been used as a medicinal herb for a variety of ailments.

== Description ==
London rocket is a winter annual herb which is very variable in size. It can grow to be a large, leafy plant as much as 130 centimetres (51 in) tall in Britain, but only a small, rosette-forming one about 10 cm (4 in) tall in Arabia, where it is native. It has an erect, usually branched stem which is green, terete, solid and almost glabrous, except for a smattering of soft, short hairs (0.5 millimetres or 1/32 inch long). The leaves are alternate and imparipinnate or pinnatisect, up to 18 cm (7 in) long, with one to five pairs of lateral lobes and a round or ternate terminal lobe. The petioles are up to 6 cm (2 1/4 in) long, channelled and slightly decurrent down the stem, without stipules. They are finely hairy on both surfaces, uniformly green except for a pale midrib, and have a peppery flavour.

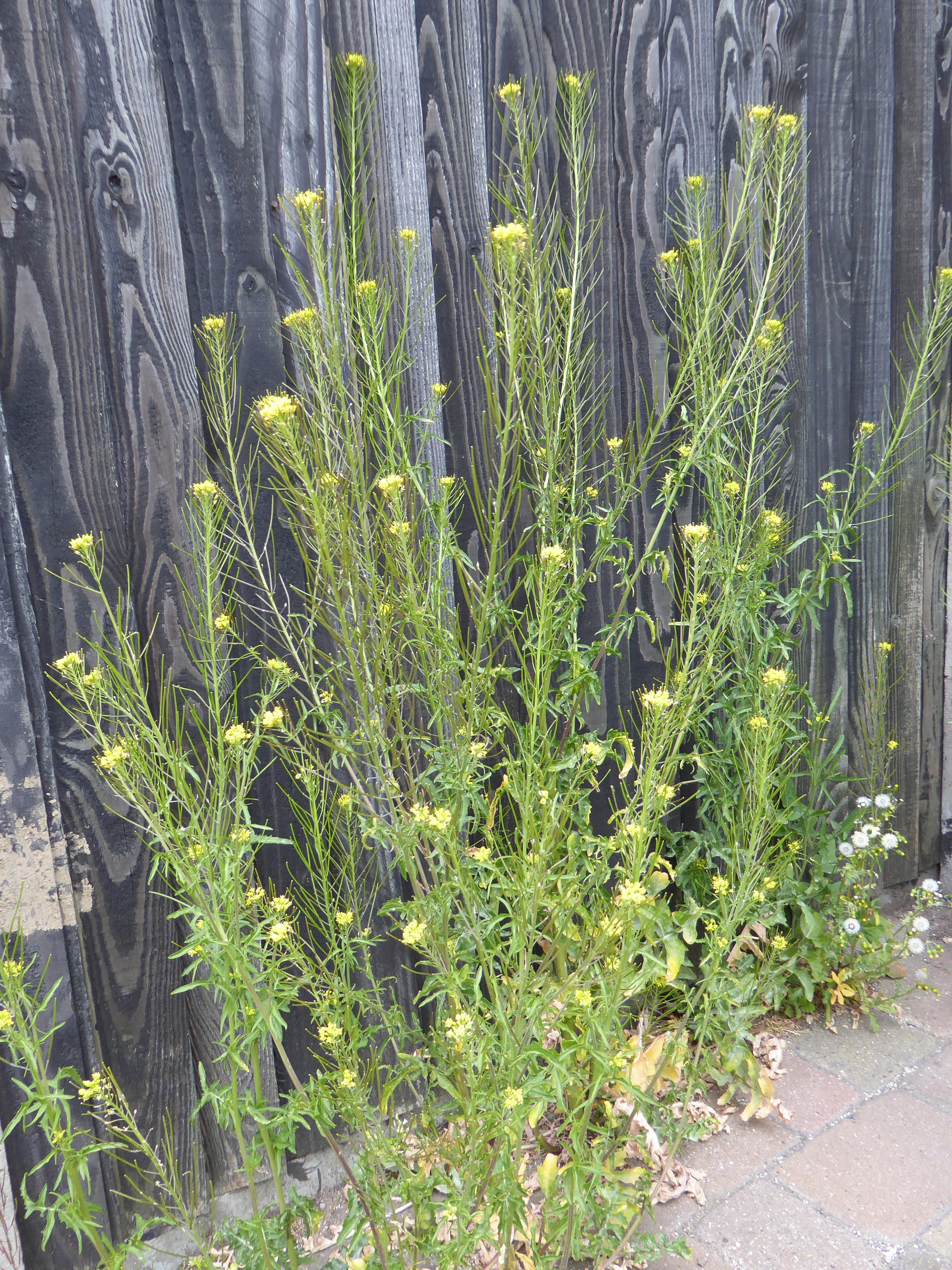
London rocket in flower and fruit

The actinomorphic flowers are about 5 mm (1/4 in) in diameter and are arranged in racemes of 50–100 or more at the tips of the main stem and the branches. Each flower has 4 yellow petals, 4 green, finely hairy sepals which are nearly as long as the petals, and 6 stamens. The flower stalks (pedicels) are short at flowering time, creating a rather flat-topped and crowded inflorescence, but they elongate as the fruits develop, soon causing them to overtop the flowers. The fruit is a long (3–8 cm) narrow cylindrical silique which stays green when ripe and is slightly torulose (i.e. with lumps where the seeds occur, like a string of beads), and they are held at a divergent angle to the stem on the long, thin, hairy pedicels. When dried the fruit contains one row of small (about 1 mm) red oblong seeds in each of the two valves of the silique, amounting to about 100 seeds in each pod. A single plant can therefore produce many tens of thousands of seeds in total.

=== Identification ===
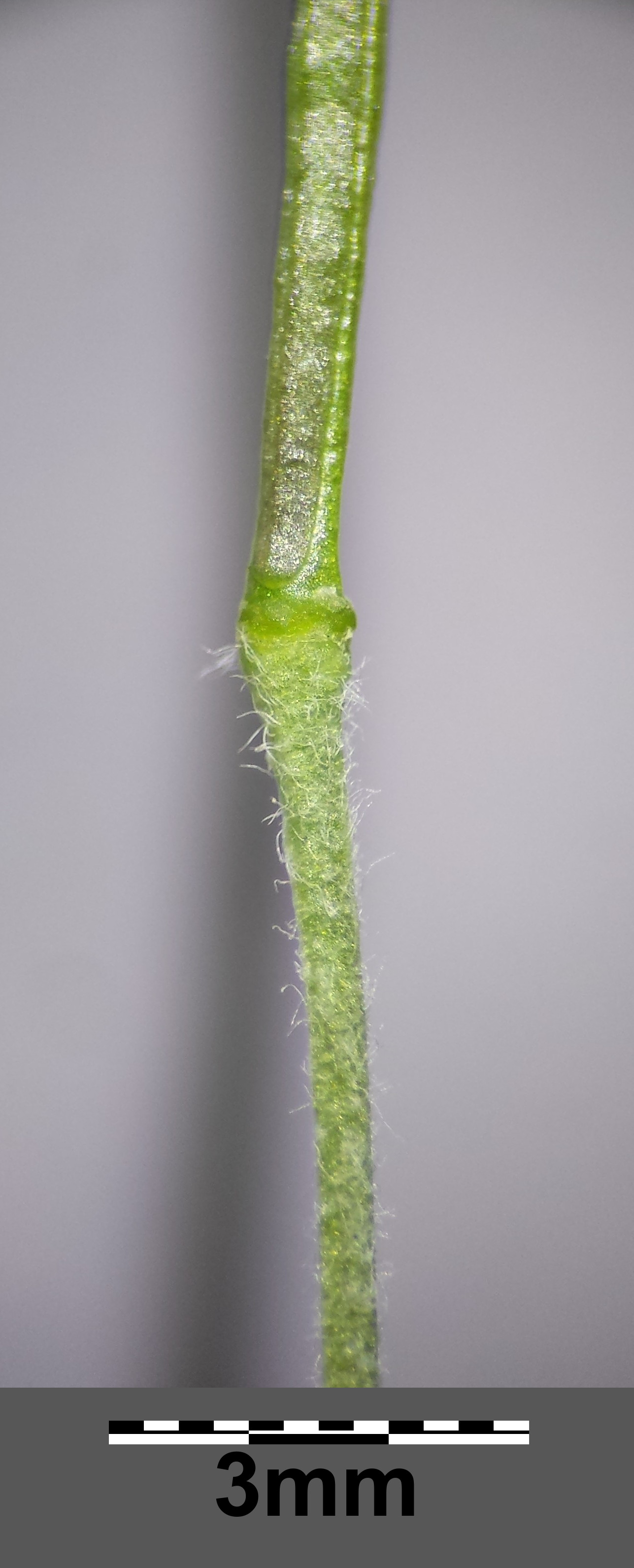
The fruiting pedicel is long and narrower than the silique

London rocket can easily be confused with other species of Sisymbrium. Characters to look for include the compact flower head, the way the developing seedpods extend above the flowers, and the long, thin pedicels which are narrower than the fruits.

== Taxonomy ==
The name Sisymbrium irio was coined by Linnaeus in 1753, in his Species Plantarum. Since then it has accumulated many synonyms, including Phryne laxata (by Pietro Bubani in 1901) and Arabis charbonnelii (by Augustin Léveillé in 1913), but the original name is still accepted as the correct one. A full list of synonyms is given in the Update on the Brassicaceae Species Checklist.

Several subspecies and varieties have also been named over the years, but again none is currently accepted.

The chromosome number of London rocket is a complex subject. The diploid has 14 chromosomes (2n = 14), but there are triploid, tetraploid, hexaploid and octoploid "races" with 21, 28, 42 and 56 chromosomes, respectively. These races have different phenotypes and ecological adaptations, and they vary in their fertility, with the triploid being almost entirely sterile.

== Distribution and status ==
London rocket is thought to be native in the Middle East and as far eastward as northwest India or Mongolia, and westward throughout North Africa and southern Europe. It has been introduced to North America, where it is considered something of a pest species in the southern US and Mexico, and to South America, Australasia and southern Africa. It has also spread as far east as Korea and Japan.

Its status internationally has not been evaluated, but it is not considered to be at risk in most countries in which it occurs, as is classified as Least Concern.

London rocket was introduced to Britain by the 1650s and has maintained a scattered distribution since then. It does not tend to persist in any site for long, and is even believed to have disappeared from London by the late 19th century, only to be reintroduced again in the 20th. It comes in via docks and other transport hubs, and it used to turn up in fields that had been treated with wool shoddy. Overall, the population has remained more or less stable for centuries, although its transient nature means there are many more places where it used to occur than there are at any one time, leading to the mistaken impression that it is perpetually declining.

One country where it has recently arrived is South Korea, where it has been studied very closely. The point of arrival was the port of Busan, from where it spread 1.5 kilometres (0.9 mi) along a roadside over a 10 year period. It is currently considered to be established but not invasive.

== Habitat and ecology ==
The Database of Insects and their Food Plants lists just two species that make use of London rocket: Ceutorhynchus hirtulus is a weevil that lives in the soil and creates stem galls for it larvae, whereas cabbage looper moth larvae eat the leaves of this and many other species in the cabbage family.

This species is considered a weed in the Southwestern United States and other regions where it has been introduced.

== History ==
The first published record of this species in Britain was by Christopher Merret in 1666, who described Irio laevis as being "almost everywhere in the suburbs of London on walls and near ditches". It had, however, been noticed at least a decade earlier: William How (1620–1656) had annotated his own copy of his book Phytologia Britannica (1650) with the comment "near White Chappel east from Aldgate, London"; a discovery he attributed to John Goodyer.

The term "London" in the common name "London rocket" allegedly comes from its abundance after the Great Fire of London in 1666. Robert Morison, the physician to King Charles II, attributed their appearance to spontaneous generation when he observed that “these hot bitter plants with four petals and pods were produced spontaneously without seed by the ashes of the fire mixed with salt and lime.” By contrast, Dr E.J. Salisbury, in his study of the bombsites of London after the Blitz in 1940, "failed to find a single specimen, nor has any other reliable observer reported it".

The term "Rocket" in the common name appears to be derived from the old Latin term "eruca" applied to several loosely related plants in the cabbage family.

== Uses ==
In desert regions of Arabia and Egypt, London rocket is considered an important source of fodder for livestock.

The leaves, seeds, and flowers are edible to humans, with a spicy flavor similar to cultivated rocket. London rocket is used in the Middle East to treat coughs and chest congestion, to relieve rheumatism, to detoxify the liver and spleen, and to reduce swelling and clean wounds.

The Bedouin of the Sinai Peninsula and the Negev desert reportedly used the leaf of London rocket as a tobacco substitute, and a recent study of the alkaloid content of desert-grown plants in Iraq found a high concentration of nicotine in extracts of the aerial parts of this plant.

The cured pods can be placed in a basket with live coals and shaken until the pods are parched, then ground into meal and made into soup or stew.
