= Marina Orgeyeva =

Russian politician

- Марина Оргеева
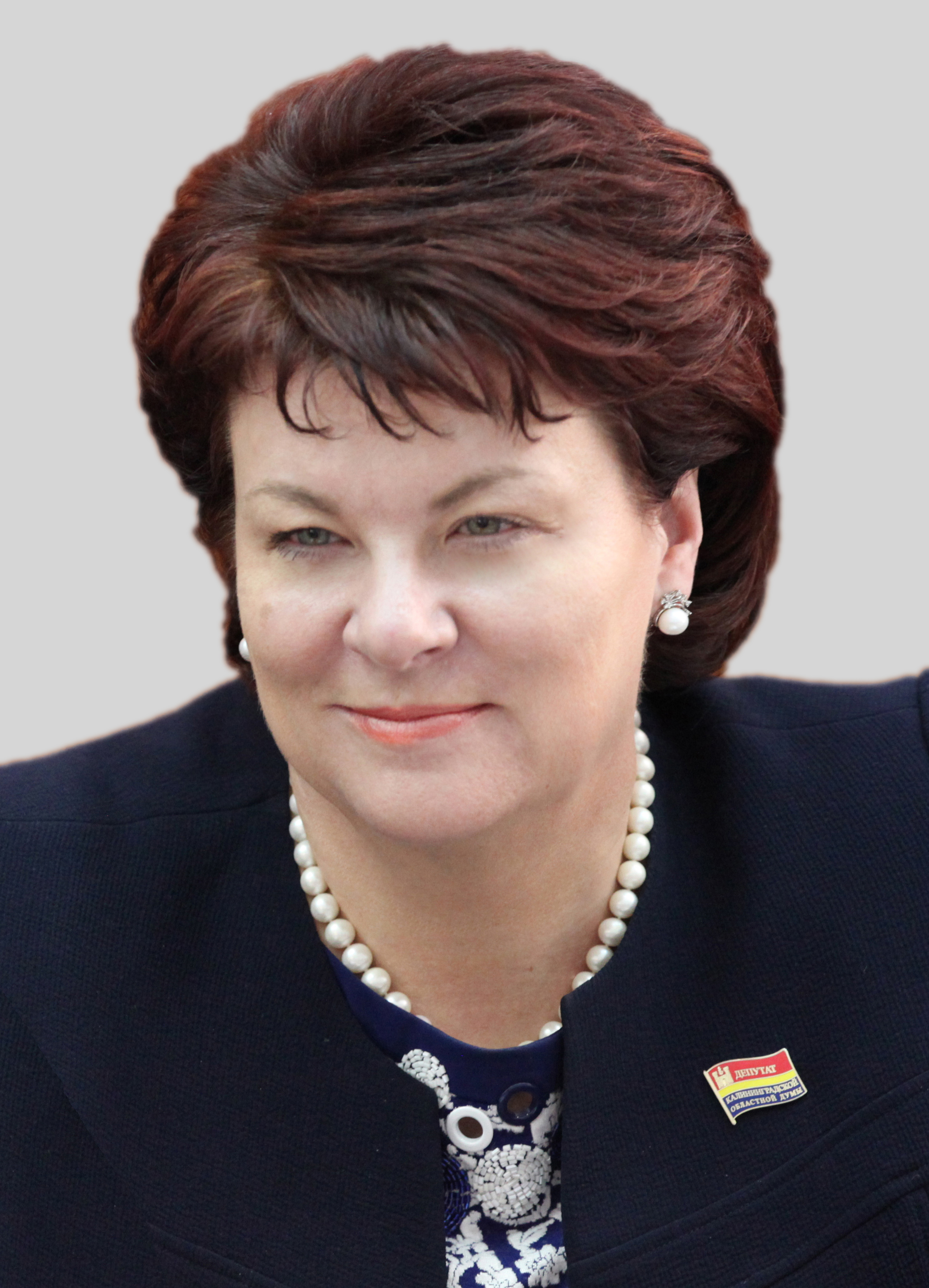
- Orgeyeva in 2015

Member of the State Duma for Kaliningrad Oblast
- Incumbent
- Assumed office 12 October 2021
- Preceded by: Alexander Yaroshuk
- Constituency: Central Kaliningrad (No. 98)

Personal details
- Born: 21 September 1959 (age 66) Kaliningrad, RSFSR, USSR
- Party: United Russia; CPSU (formerly)
- Spouse: Igor Vladimirovich Orgeev
- Children: Anastasiya Igorevna (daughter)
- Education: Immanuel Kant Baltic Federal University; RANEPA

Marina Eduardovna Orgeyeva (Russian: Марина Эдуардовна Оргеева; born 21 September 1959) is a Russian politician. She is the United Russia MP for the Kaliningrad Central constituency.

She was first elected in the 2021 Russian legislative election.

== See also ==
- List of members of the 8th Russian State Duma
