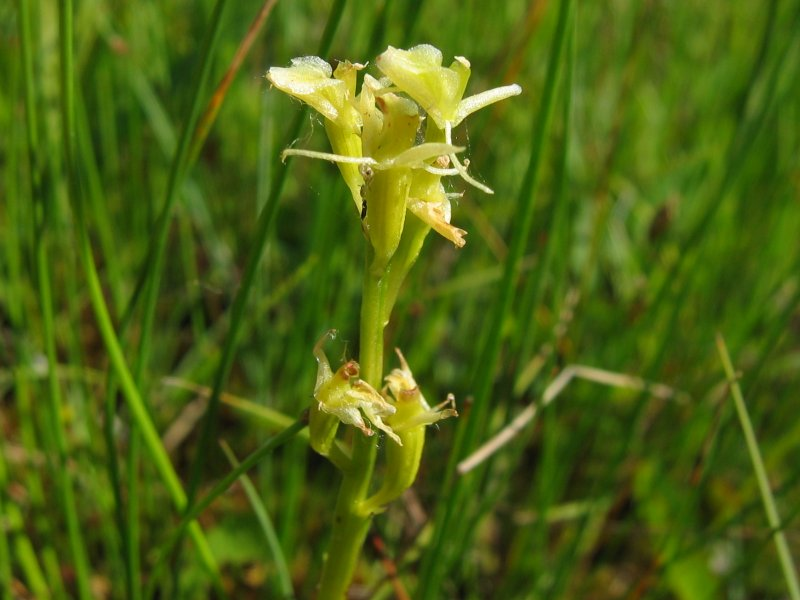

Scientific classification
- Kingdom: Plantae
- Clade: Tracheophytes
- Clade: Angiosperms
- Clade: Monocots
- Order: Asparagales
- Family: Orchidaceae
- Subfamily: Epidendroideae
- Subtribe: Malaxidinae
- Genus: Liparis
- Species: L. loeselii

Binomial name
- Liparis loeselii (L.) Rich.

Synonyms
- Ophrys loeselii L.; Ophrys trigona Gilib.; Ophrys pulchella Salisb.; Cymbidium loeselii (L.) Sw.; Malaxis loeselii (L.) Sw.; Serapias loeselii (L.) Hoffm.; Malaxis correana W.P.C. Barton; Malaxis longifolia W. P. C. Barton; Pseudorchis loeselii (L.) Gray; Anistylis lutea Raf.; Sturmia loeselii (L.) Rchb.; Liparis correana (W. P. C. Barton) Spreng.; Paliris loeselii (L.) Dumort.; Mesoptera loeselii (L.) Raf.; Orchis loeselii (L.) MacMill.; Liparis bifolia St.-Lag.; Leptorkis loeselii (L.) MacMill.; Liparis loeselii var. ovata Ridd. ex Godfery

= Liparis loeselii =

Species of orchid

Liparis loeselii, the fen orchid, yellow widelip orchid, or bog twayblade, is a rare species of orchid. It is native to Europe, northern Asia, the eastern United States, and eastern Canada. It grows in fens, bogs and dune slacks. It has yellow flowers and glossy yellow-green leaves.

It only grows to 5-20 centimetres. The lower part of the stem is surrounded by 2-3 relatively large light green, fatty leaves, tongue-like in appearance. Under these, a few inconspicuous small leaves can be found. The yellow-green flowers are normally numbered between 5-10. Sometimes only 1-2 flowers can be found, at most 30.

Small specimens which do not carry flowers can sometimes be confused with Malaxis monophyllos and Hammarbya paludosa which can be found in the same milieu.

The species was named for German botanist Johannes Loesel.

Subspecies

1. Liparis loeselii subsp. loeselii - Europe, Russia, Kazakhstan, Canada, United States
2. Liparis loeselii subsp. orientalis Efimov - Altay region of Russia
3. Liparis loeselii subsp. sachalinensis (Nakai) Efimov - Sakhalin Island in Russia

== Threats of extinction ==
This plant is severely threatened and even extinct in many regions where it was previously found. Since it needs an even supply of water, changes in the biotope which affect water supply prove damaging. The draining or drying out of swamps and marshes can be particularly damaging for this plant.

In Sweden, it is today only found in the islands Öland and Gotland as well as parts of Skåne, where it is a threatened species.

In Norway, it is now considered extinct, having not been observed since 1933.

In Finland, it is today only found in the island of Åland.
