= Stepan Guryev =

Soviet Red Army officer and major-general in World War II

Stepan Savelyevich Guryev
- Born: 1 August 1902; Romanovo, Russian Empire (now Lenino, Lipetsk Oblast, Russian Federation)
- Died: 22 April 1945 (aged 42); Pillau, East Prussia (now Baltiysk, Kaliningrad Oblast, Russian Federation)
- Military career
- Allegiance: Soviet Union
- Branch: Red Army
- Service years: 1919–1945
- Rank: Major-general
- Commands: 5th Airborne Corps / 39th Guards Rifle Division (1942–1943); 16th Guards Rifle Corps (1944–1945)
- Conflicts: World War II; Battle of Stalingrad; Battle of Königsberg
- Awards: Hero of the Soviet Union

Stepan Savelevich Guryev (Russian: Степан Савельевич Гурьев; 1 August 1902 - 22 April 1945) was a Soviet Red Army officer and major-general in World War II who led the 5th Airborne Corps, which was reformed into the 39th Guards Rifle Division in August 1942 and fought at Stalingrad.

== Biography ==
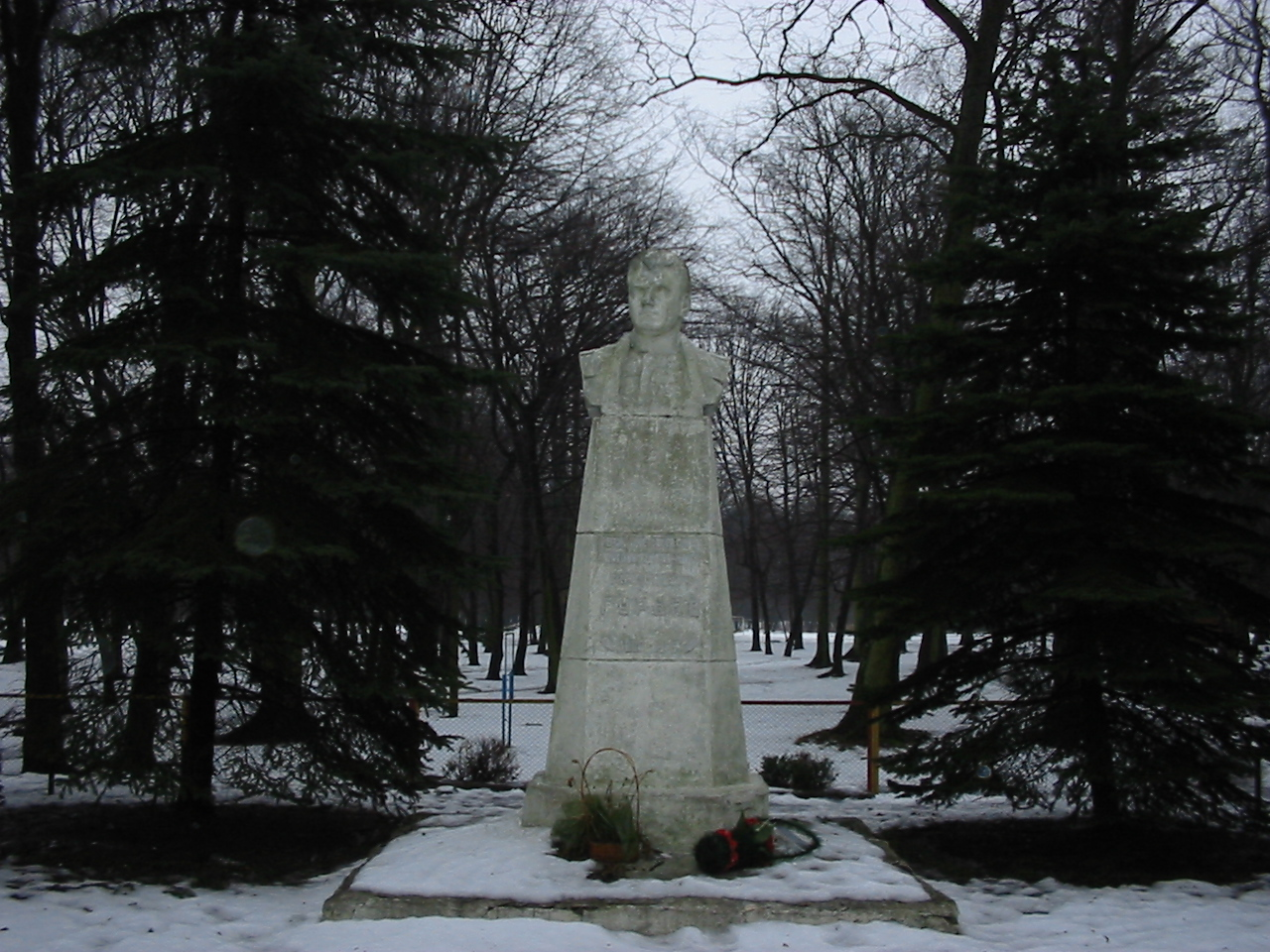
Monument to Guryev in Guryevsk

Appointed commander of the 16th Guards Rifle Corps in 1944, he led the Corps into East Prussia and the Battle of Königsberg.

The general was killed in action at Pillau (today Baltiysk) on 22 April 1945, three days after being awarded the honorary title of Hero of the Soviet Union by the Presidium of the Supreme Soviet of the USSR.

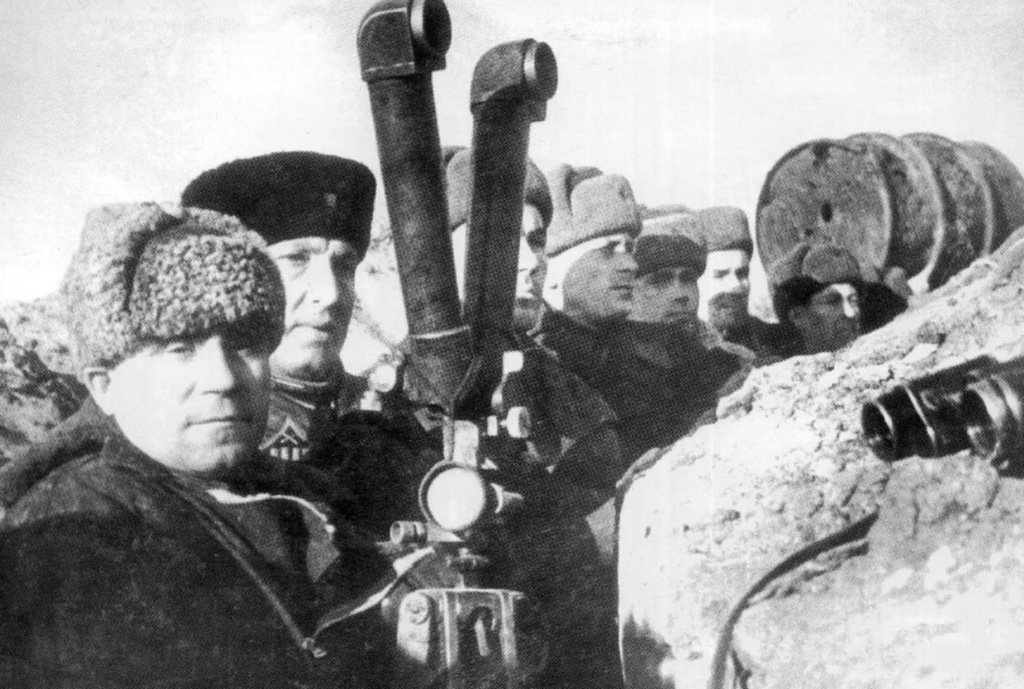
Guryev at an observation post in Stalingrad, 1943

The city Guryevsk in the Russian Federation's Kaliningrad Oblast is named after him.
