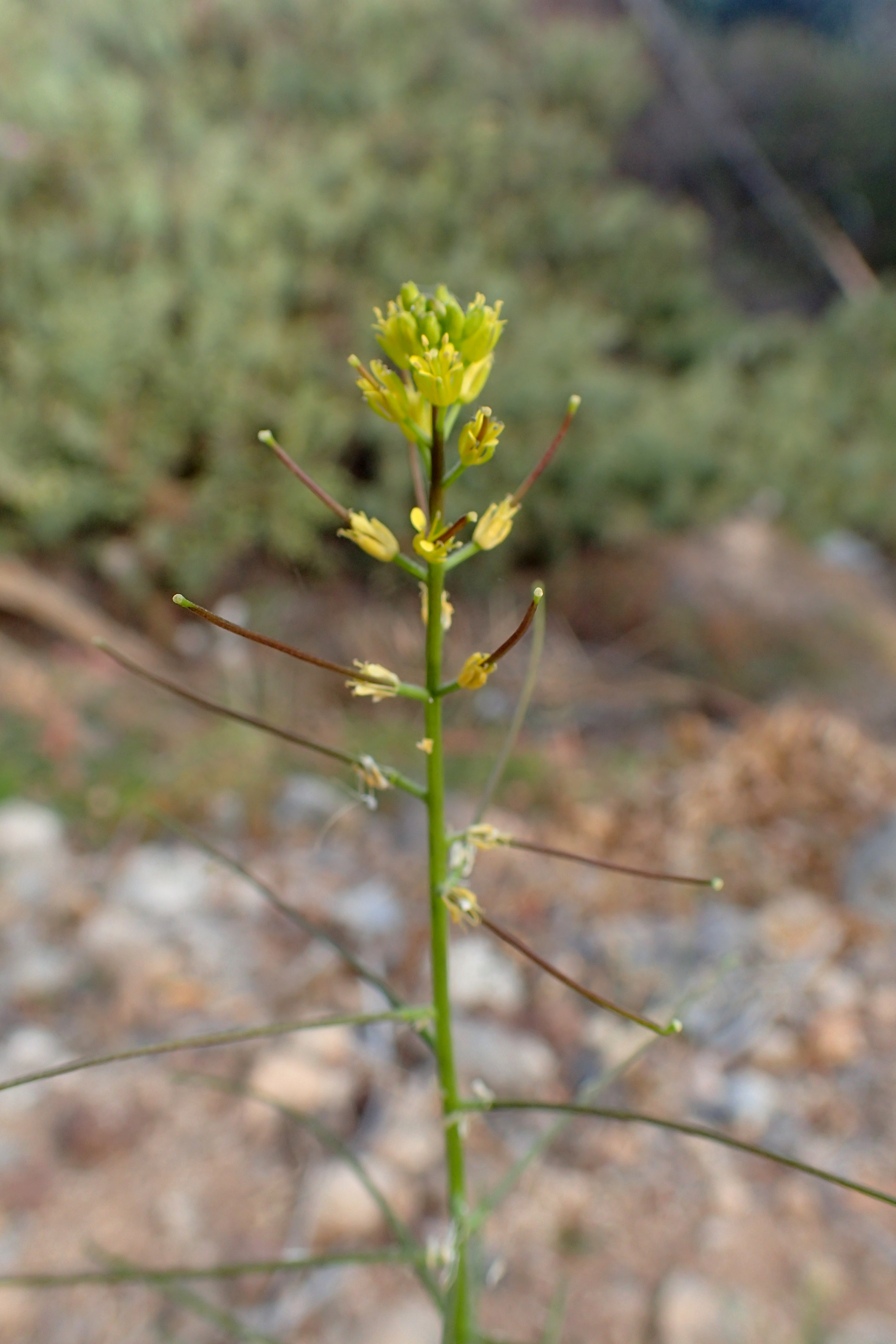
- Sisymbrium erysimoides (inflorescence)

Scientific classification
- Kingdom: Plantae
- Clade: Tracheophytes
- Clade: Angiosperms
- Clade: Eudicots
- Clade: Rosids
- Order: Brassicales
- Family: Brassicaceae
- Genus: Sisymbrium
- Species: S. erysimoides

Binomial name
- Sisymbrium erysimoides Desf.

= Sisymbrium erysimoides =

Smooth mustard

Species of flowering plant

Sisymbrium erysimoides, known as smooth mustard, is a plant in the family Brassicaceae. It is found on roadsides and wasteland, and as a weed of arable land. A native to western Mediterranean region, it is now well-established throughout the world.

== Description ==
Cool season annual, erect, glabrous or shortly pubescent herb 10–80 cm tall. Basal leaves are up to 15 cm long, lyrate-pinnatifid, toothed, petiolate, reducing to lanceolate, mostly toothed. Flowerheads are paniculate. Sepals are 1–2 mm long and glabrous. Petals are 1–2.5 mm long, yellow to pale yellow. Siliqua are linear, straight, horizontal, 2.5–5 cm long, 1 mm wide and attenuate into a style; pedicels are thick and 2–5 mm long. Flowering is in late winter and spring.

It was introduced in Australia where it is now widespread in dry regions west of the Tablelands.

== Uses ==
=== In food ===
Young leaves are eaten as salad.

=== Traditional medicine ===
Ethnobotanically used as a medicinal plants for respiratory disorders. Antioxidant molecules - Apigenin, apigenin-7-O-galactoside, apigenin-7-O-β-rhamnoside, apigenin-7-O-glucuronide, kaempferol, apigenin-7-O-rhamnosyl galactoronide, kaempferol-3-xyloside-7-galactoside, quercetin-6,4′-dimethoxy-3-fructo-rhamnoside, quercetin 4′-methoxy-3-fructo-rhamnoside - were reported to be identified from the plant. The whole plant extract was reported to have anti-inflammatory and analgesic activities.
