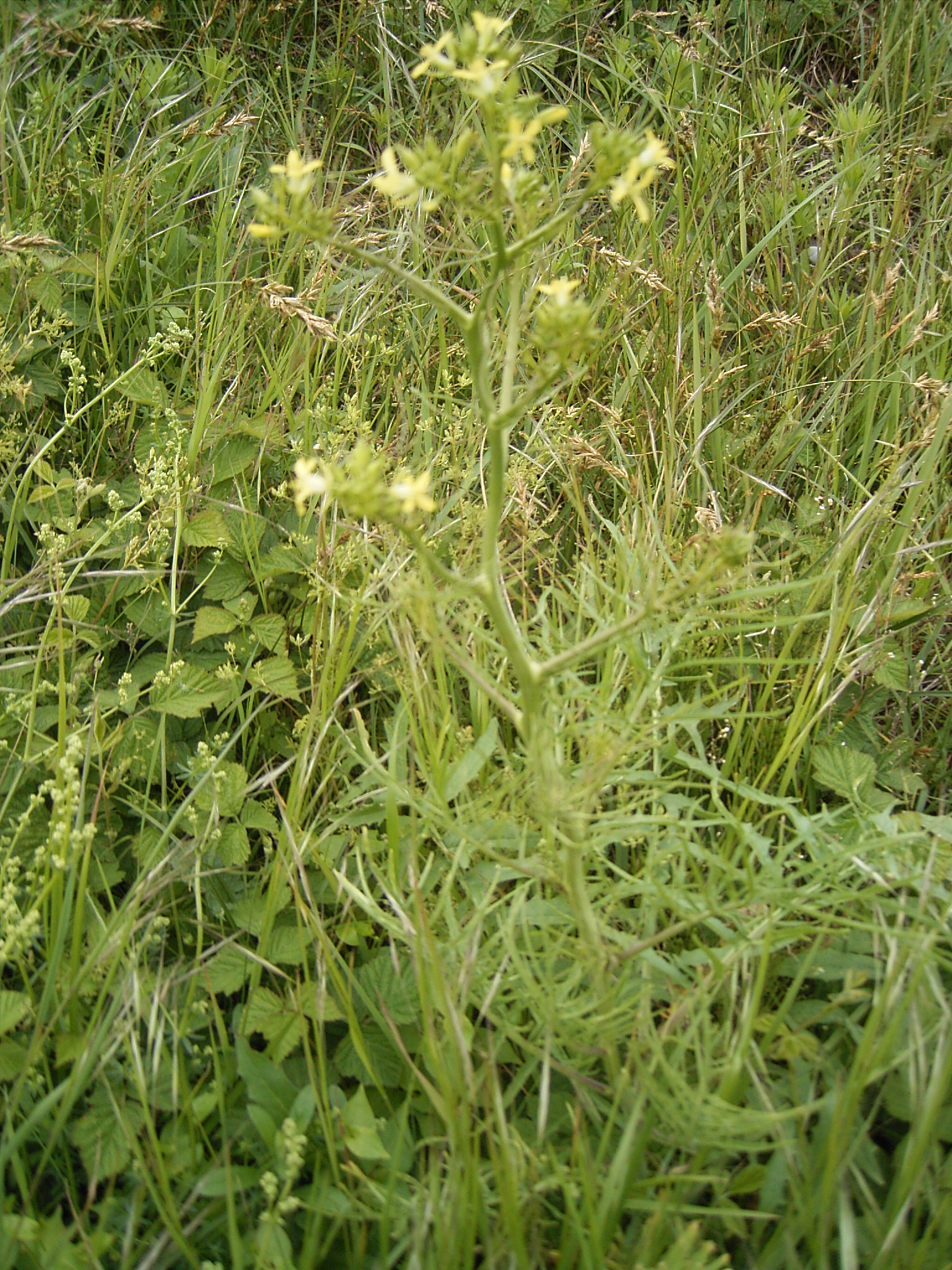
- Jim Hill Mustard; Sisymbrium altissimum

Scientific classification
- Kingdom: Plantae
- Clade: Tracheophytes
- Clade: Angiosperms
- Clade: Eudicots
- Clade: Rosids
- Order: Brassicales
- Family: Brassicaceae
- Genus: Sisymbrium; L.

Species
- Several, see text

= Sisymbrium =

Genus of flowering plants

Sisymbrium is a genus of plants in the family Brassicaceae. Many of the common names for species in this genus include rocket, mustard, or hedge mustard.

== Species ==
As of March 2024, Plants of the World Online accepted the following species:

- Sisymbrium afghanicum Gilli
- Sisymbrium altissimum L. – Jim Hill mustard, tall rocket, tall tumblemustard
- Sisymbrium assoanum Loscos & J.Pardo
- Sisymbrium austriacum Jacq.
- Sisymbrium brassiciforme C.A.Mey.
- Sisymbrium burchellii DC.
- Sisymbrium capense Thunb.
- Sisymbrium cavanillesianum Castrov. & Valdés Berm.
- Sisymbrium chrysanthum Jord.
- Sisymbrium crassifolium Cav.
- Sisymbrium damascenum Boiss. & Gaill.
- Sisymbrium dissitiflorum O.E.Schulz
- Sisymbrium elatum K.Koch
- Sisymbrium erucastrifolium (Rupr.) Trautv.
- Sisymbrium erysimoides Desf. - smooth mustard
- Sisymbrium gamosepalum Hedge
- Sisymbrium gaubae Rech.f. & Bornm.
- Sisymbrium heteromallum C.A.Mey.
- Sisymbrium hispanicum Jacq.
- Sisymbrium integerrimum Rech.f. & Aellen
- Sisymbrium irio L. - London rocket
- Sisymbrium isatidifolium Blanca, Cueto & J.Fuentes
- Sisymbrium isfarense Vassilcz.
- Sisymbrium kermanicum Khodash. & Mirtadz.
- Sisymbrium lasiocalyx Prokh.
- Sisymbrium leucocladum (Boiss.) D.A.German & Al-Shehbaz
- Sisymbrium linifolium (Nutt.) Nutt. - flaxleaf plainsmustard, skeleton mustard, Salmon River plains-mustard
- Sisymbrium lipskyi N.Busch
- Sisymbrium loeselii L. – false London rocket
- Sisymbrium luteum (Maxim.) O.E.Schulz
- Sisymbrium macroloma Pomel
- Sisymbrium malatyanum Mutlu & Karakuş
- Sisymbrium maurum Maire
- Sisymbrium maximum Hochst. ex E.Fourn.
- Sisymbrium nepalense Al-Shehbaz
- Sisymbrium officinale (L.) Scop. – hedge mustard, used in some cuisines
- Sisymbrium orientale L. – eastern rocket
- Sisymbrium pallescens Jord.
- Sisymbrium pinnatisectum Vassilcz. & V.I.Dorof. ex Saksonov
- Sisymbrium polyceratium L.
- Sisymbrium polymorphum (Murray) Roth
- Sisymbrium reboudianum Verl.
- Sisymbrium septulatum DC.
- Sisymbrium strictissimum L. – perennial rocket
- Sisymbrium subspinescens Bunge
- Sisymbrium turczaninowii Sond.
- Sisymbrium volgense M.Bieb. ex E.Fourn. – Russian mustard
- Sisymbrium yunnanense W.W.Sm.

S. nasturtium-aquaticum is now a synonym of Nasturtium officinale, and S. tenuifolium – of Diplotaxis tenuifolia (perennial wall-rocket).
