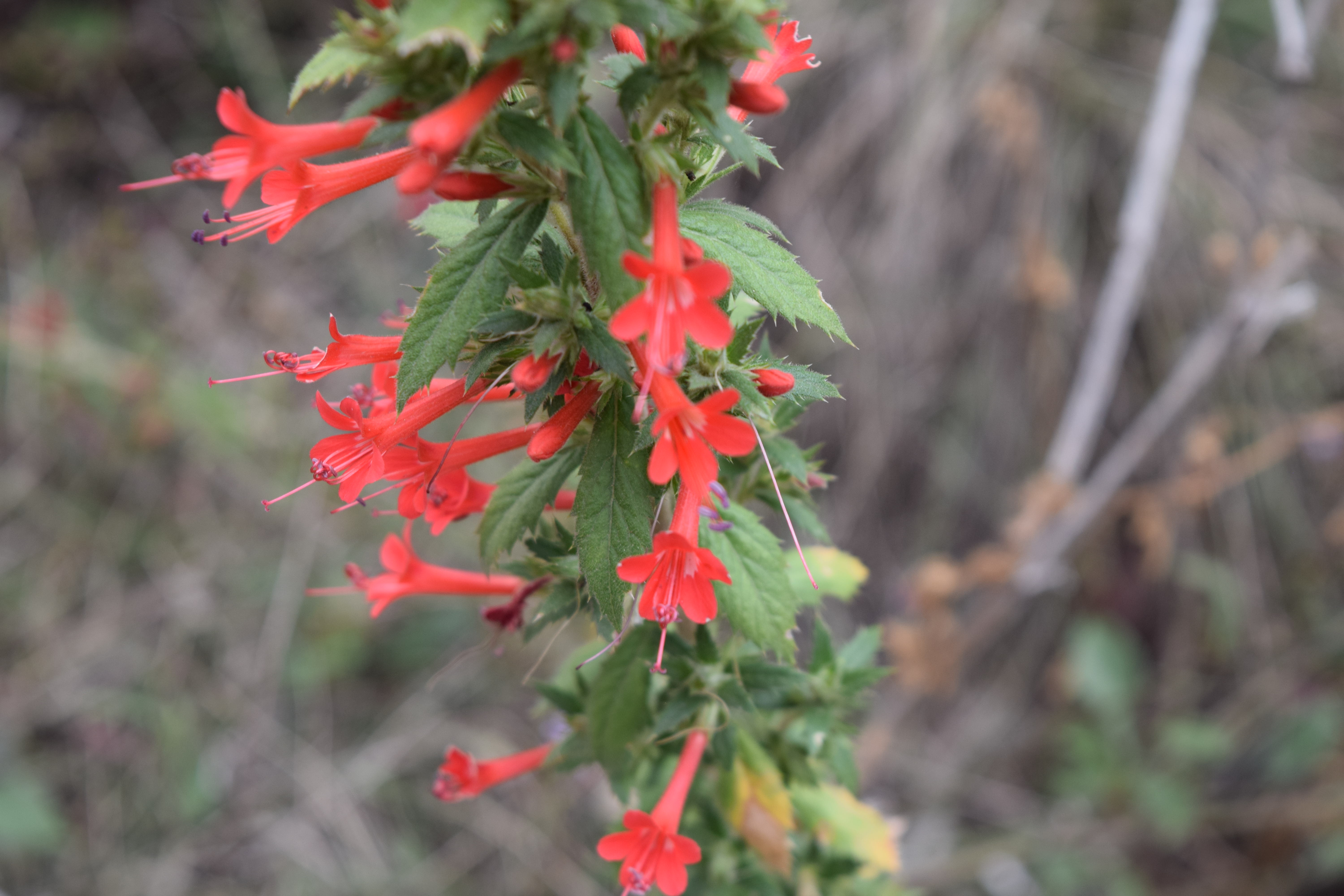
- Loeselia mexicana

Scientific classification
- Kingdom: Plantae
- Clade: Tracheophytes
- Clade: Angiosperms
- Clade: Eudicots
- Clade: Asterids
- Order: Ericales
- Family: Polemoniaceae
- Subfamily: Polemonioideae
- Tribe: Loeselieae
- Genus: Loeselia; L.

Species
- See text

Synonyms
- Hoitzia Juss.

= Loeselia =

Genus of Polemoniaceae plants

Loeselia is a genus of flowering plants in the phlox family Polemoniaceae, native to the southwestern United States, Mexico, Central America, Colombia and Venezuela. A number of species are found only in the Balsas Depression of southwestern Mexico. It was named for German botanist Johannes Loesel by Linnaeus in 1753.

== Species ==
Currently accepted species include:

- Loeselia amplectens Benth.
- Loeselia campechiana C.Gut.Báez & Duno
- Loeselia ciliata L.
- Loeselia coerulea (Cav.) G.Don
- Loeselia cordifolia Hemsl. & Rose
- Loeselia glandulosa (Cav.) G.Don
- Loeselia grandiflora Standl.
- Loeselia greggii S.Watson
- Loeselia hintoniorum B.L.Turner
- Loeselia mexicana (Lam.) Brand
- Loeselia pumila (M.Martens & Galeotti) Walp.
- Loeselia purpusii Brandegee
- Loeselia rupestris Benth.
- Loeselia rzedowskii McVaugh
- Loeselia spectabilis J.M.Porter & V.W.Steinm.
- Loeselia tancitaroensis J.M.Porter & V.W.Steinm.
