= Orekhovka (village) =

Orekhovka Ореховка
- Rural locality
- Interactive map of Orekhovka
- Location of Orekhovka Orekhovka (European Russia) Orekhovka (Russia)
- Coordinates: 54°44′58″N 20°43′46″E
- Country: Russia
- Federal subject: Kaliningrad Oblast
- Administrative district: Guryevsky District

Population (2010 Census)
  - Total: 21
  - Estimate (2010): 21 (0%)
- Time zone: UTC+2 (MSK–1)
- Postal code: 238313
- Dialing code: +7 (+7) 40151
- OKTMO ID: 27707000486

Orekhovka (Russian: Оре́ховка, German: Poduhren, Lithuanian: Padūriai) is a rural settlement in the Guryevsky District in Kaliningrad Oblast in Russia.

== Geographic location ==
Orekhovka is situated around 14 kilometers north of Kaliningrad on State Highway 27K-128, a route which connects Saosyorye on State Highway 27K-070 with Yaroslavskoye. Until 1945, the nearest rail connection was at Gamsau (Russian: Podgornoye) on the now closed route from Kaliningrad via Roshchino Possindern to Gvardeysk; the Königsberg narrow gauge railway.

== History ==
The village was mentioned in 1539, when it was part of Ducal Prussia, a vassal duchy of the Kingdom of Poland. From the 18th century, it was part of the Kingdom of Prussia, and from 1871 also Germany. Up until 1946, Orekhovka was known as „Poduhren“, a farming village that from 1874 until 1945 belonged to the administrative district of Groß Legden within the Königsberg District (from 1939 to 1945 Samland District), of the Prussian province of East Prussia. In 1910 it had a registered population of 131. On September 30, 1928, Poduhren was incorporated into the Municipal County Mantau, and gave up its political independence.

Following Germany's defeat in World War II, the village became a part of the Soviet Union. In 1947 the village was renamed Orekhovo, and as a Soviet Village fell under the jurisdiction of the city of Kaliningrad in Guryevsk Region. From 2008 until 2013 Orekhovo was part of the Municipal County Nisovskoye, and since 2013 it is again part of Guryevsky District.

== Church ==
Until 1945 the majority of the population were Lutheran Protestants. Orekhovka was part of the parish of the church in Arnau, and was part of the diocese of Königsberg in the archdiocese of Ostpreußen in the Church of the Old Prussian Union. The last German-speaking parish priest was Father Arthur Brodowski.

Since 1990, Orekhovka has come within the catchment area of the Church of the Resurrection in Kaliningrad, a part of the Evangelical Lutheran Church in Russia, Ukraine, Kazakhstan and Central Asia.
