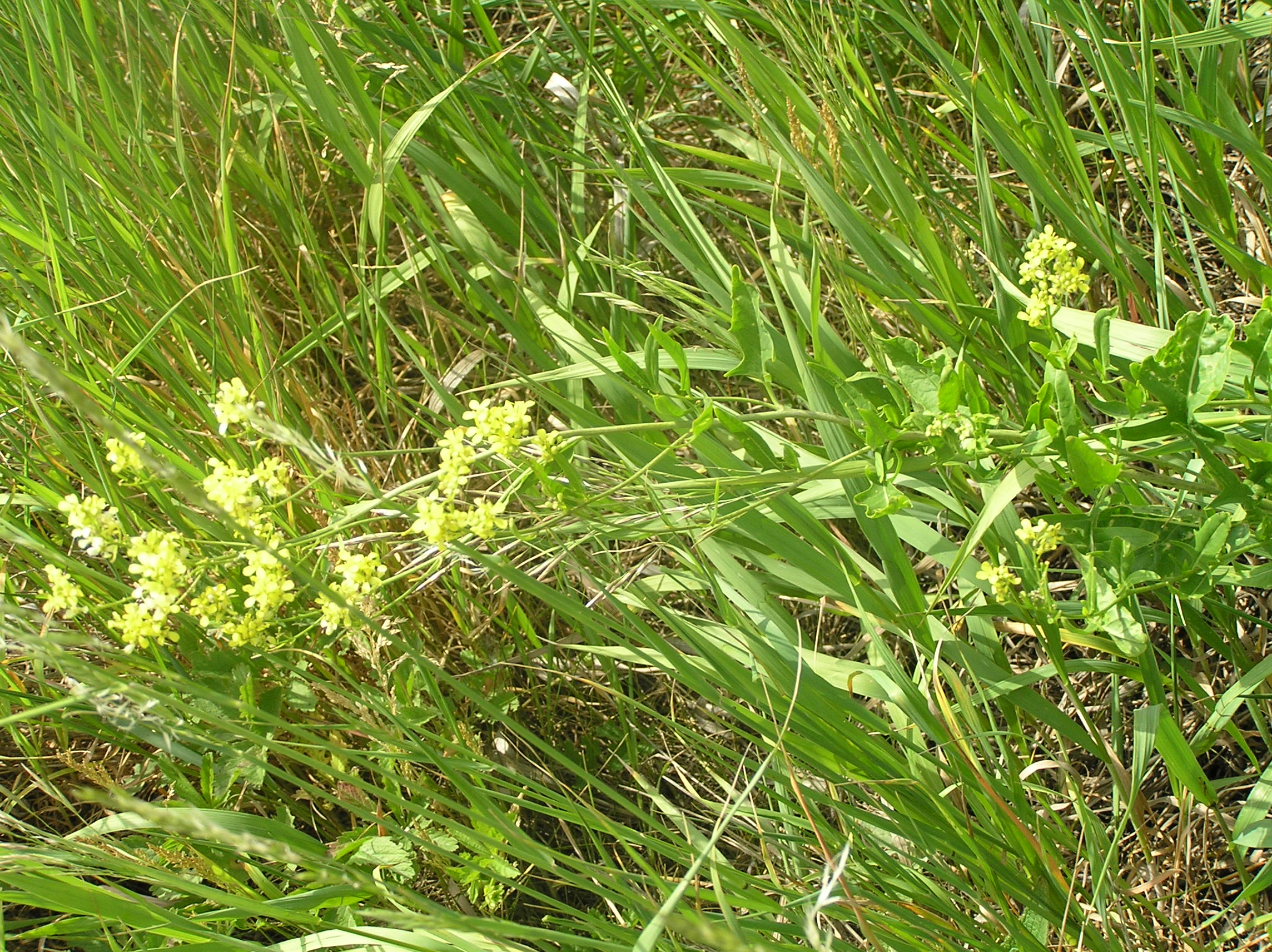

Scientific classification
- Kingdom: Plantae
- Clade: Tracheophytes
- Clade: Angiosperms
- Clade: Eudicots
- Clade: Rosids
- Order: Brassicales
- Family: Brassicaceae
- Genus: Sisymbrium
- Species: S. volgense

Binomial name
- Sisymbrium volgense M.Bieb. ex E.Fourn.

= Sisymbrium volgense =

Species of flowering plant

Sisymbrium volgense is a species of flowering plant belonging to the family Brassicaceae.

Its native range is Southwestern European Russia to Caucasus.

Synonym:

- Sisymbrium wolgense M. Bieb. ex Fourn. (orthographical variant)
