= Andrey Kolesnik =

Russian politician

- Андрей Колесник
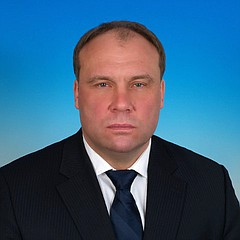

Member of the State Duma for Kaliningrad Oblast
- Incumbent
- Assumed office 12 October 2021
- Preceded by: Aleksandr Pyatikop
- Constituency: Kaliningrad (No. 97)

Member of the State Duma (Party List Seat)
- In office 21 December 2011 – 5 October 2016

Personal details
- Born: 26 February 1960 (age 66) Kaliningrad, RSFSR, USSR
- Party: United Russia
- Spouse: Marina Valentinovna Lysenko
- Children: 4
- Education: Higher Naval School of Submarine Navigation; Kaliningrad State University
- Occupation: Officer; Navy Instructor

Andrey Ivanovich Kolesnik (Russian: Андре́й Ива́нович Коле́сник, born 26 February 1960 in Kaliningrad) is a Russian political figure and deputy of the 6th and 8th State Dumas.

== Career ==
Until 1991, Kolesnik served as a naval navigator at the Baltic Fleet. In 1991, due to an injury, he started teaching at the Baltic Naval Institute. From the 1990s and till 2011, he was the chairman of the board of directors of the Kaliningrad Port. From March to December 2011, he was the deputy of the district council of Kaliningrad, representing United Russia. From 2011 to 2016, he was the deputy of the 6th State Duma from the Kaliningrad Oblast constituency; simultaneously, he acted as a secretary of the regional branch of the United Russia. In 2018–2021, he was the deputy of the Kaliningrad Oblast Duma. Since 2021, he was re-elected deputy of the 8th State Duma.

In December 2021, Kolesnik participated in a group brawl that took place among deputies of the State Duma during the discussion of the bill on QR codes.

In July 2023, a court in Kaliningrad satisfied the claim of the Russian Prosecutor General's Office, which accused Kolesnik of illegally owning shares in Kaliningrad Sea Trade Port JSC. Kolesnik acquired 28.5% of the port back in the early 2000s. Having been elected as a deputy in 2011, he did not give up the business, but transferred the shares to relatives and trusted persons. The court considered it necessary to recover from him 369 million rubles and more than 50 thousand shares.

=== Sanctions ===
He was sanctioned by the UK government in 2022 in relation to the Russo-Ukrainian War.
