= Guryevsk, Kaliningrad Oblast =

Town in Kaliningrad Oblast, Russia

Guryevsk Гурьевск
- Town
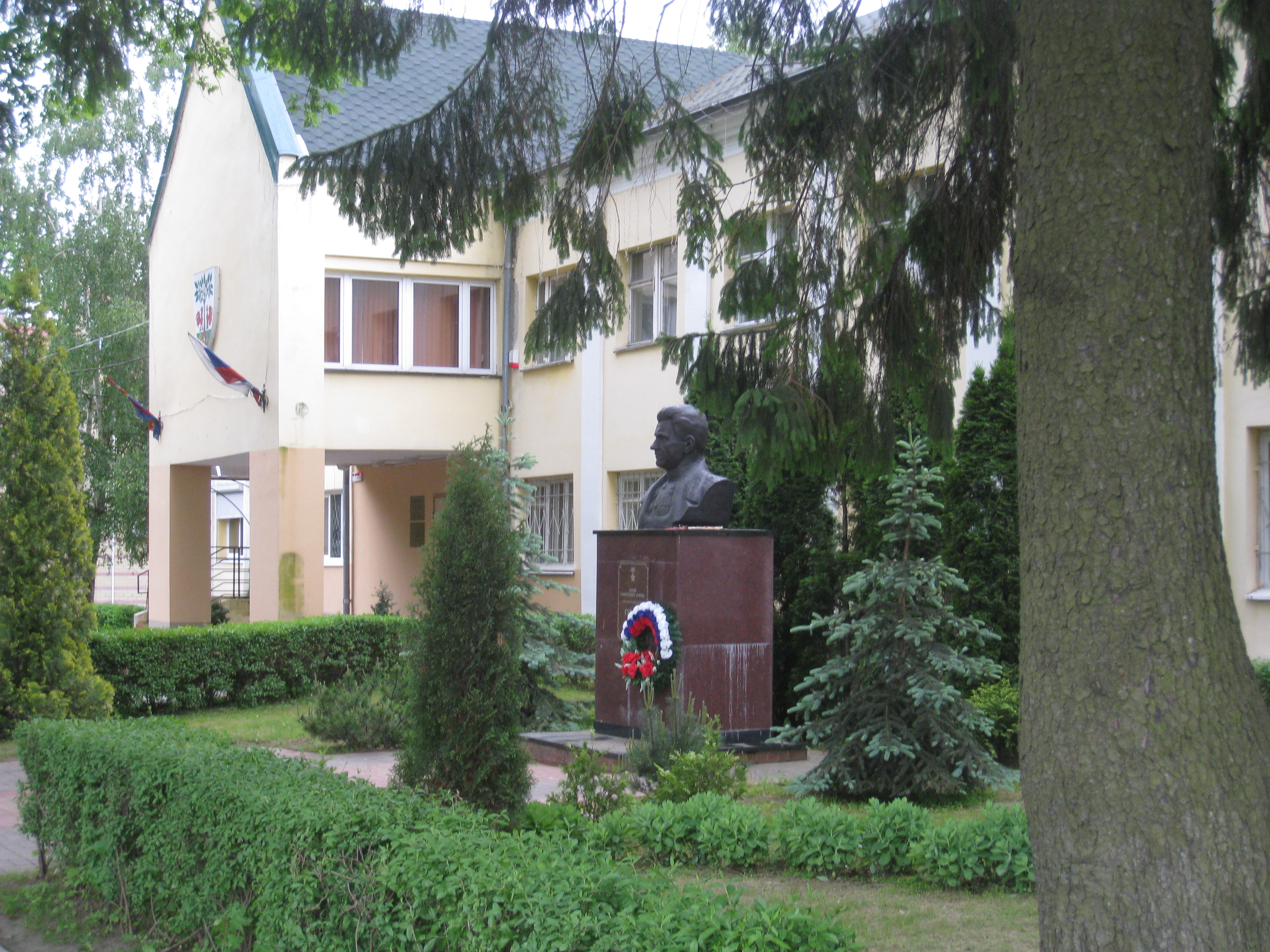

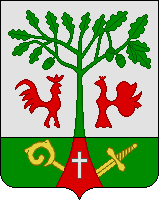
- Coat of arms
- Interactive map of Guryevsk
- Location of Guryevsk Guryevsk (European Russia) Guryevsk (Europe)
- Coordinates: 54°47′N 20°37′E
- Country: Russia
- Federal subject: Kaliningrad Oblast
- Administrative district: Guryevsky District
- Town of district significanceSelsoviet: Guryevsk
- Founded: 1262
- Elevation: 20 m (66 ft)

Population (2010 Census)
  - Total: 12,431
  - Estimate (2023): 27,751 (+123.2%)

Administrative status
  - Capital of: Guryevsky District, town of district significance of Guryevsk

Municipal status
  - Urban okrug: Guryevsky Urban Okrug
  - Capital of: Guryevsky Urban Okrug
- Time zone: UTC+2 (MSK–1)
- Postal code: 689450
- OKTMO ID: 27707000001

Guryevsk (Russian: Гу́рьевск, German: Neuhausen) is a town and the administrative center of Guryevsky District of Kaliningrad Oblast, Russia, located 7 kilometers (4.3 mi) northeast of Kaliningrad. Population: 19,670 (2021 census); 12,431 (2010 census); 10,913 (2002 census); 7,934 (1989 Soviet census).

== History ==
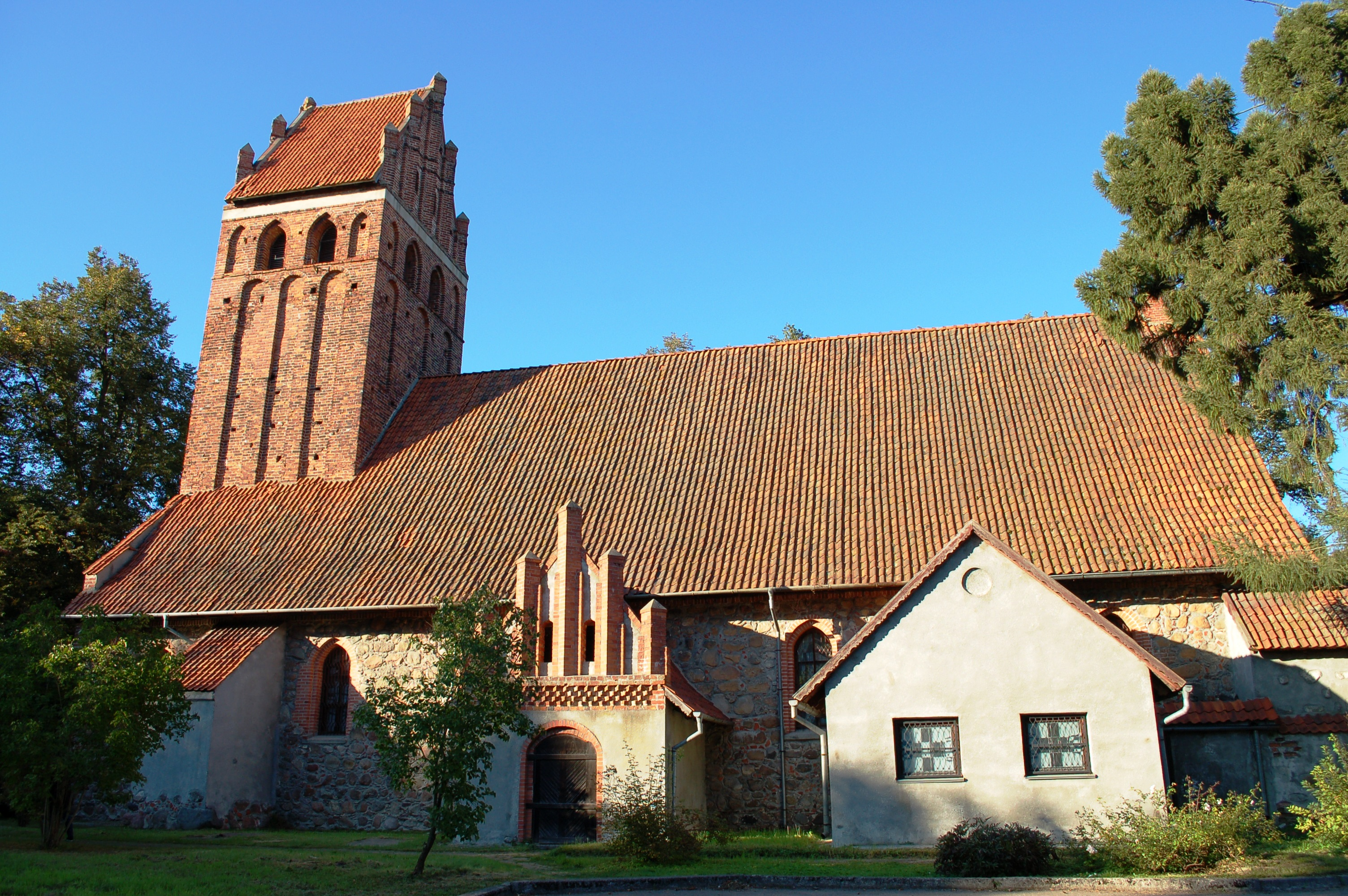
Gothic church

In 1255 the Sambians tribe's stronghold of Vurgvala was taken by Teutonic Knights and renamed as Neuhausen in 1262. Around 1292, the Castle of the Sambian Chapter was built. In 1454, King Casimir IV Jagiellon incorporated the region to the Kingdom of Poland upon the request of the Prussian Confederation, which rebelled against the Teutonic Order. After the subsequent Thirteen Years' War (1454–1466), it became a fief of Poland held by the Teutonic Knights until 1525, and by secular Ducal Prussia afterwards. From 1701, the settlement was part of the Kingdom of Prussia, and in 1871 it became part of the German Empire upon the unification of Germany, within which it was administered as part of the Province of East Prussia. In 1877, the village had a population of 559, mostly employed in agriculture and cattle breeding. It was captured by Red Army on 28 January 1945.

After the end of World War II in 1945, the town was annexed by the Soviet Union. The remaining German population which had not been evacuated was subsequently expelled in accordance with the Potsdam Agreement and replaced with Russians. The following year it was renamed Guryevsk in honor of Stepan Guryev, a Soviet marshal who died during the capture of Kaliningrad.

== Administrative and municipal status ==
Within the framework of administrative divisions, Guryevsk serves as the administrative center of Guryevsky District. As an administrative division, it is incorporated within Guryevsky District as the town of district significance of Guryevsk.

Within the framework of municipal divisions, since May 31, 2013, the territories of the town of district significance of Guryevsk and of seven rural okrugs of Guryevsky District are incorporated as Guryevsky Urban Okrug. Before that, the town of district significance was incorporated within Guryevsky Municipal District as Guryevskoye Urban Settlement.

== Notable people ==
- Martin Kähler (1835–1912), theologian
