= Johannes Loesel =

German botanist (1607–1655)

- Born: 26 August 1607; Brandenberg, Prussia
- Died: 30 March 1655 (aged 47); Königsberg, Prussia
- Education: University of Königsberg
- Scientific career
- Fields: Botany
- Workplaces: University of Königsberg; University of Leiden
- Author abbrev. (botany): Loesel

Johannes Loesel (26 August 1607 – 30 March 1655) was a German botanist and physician who was an expert on the natural flora of Prussia.

== Biography ==
Loesel was born in Brandenberg, Prussia (now Ushakovo, Russia) on 26 August 1607. He earned his PhD at the University of Königsberg in 1632, and attained his MD at University of Leiden in 1639. Loesel travelled around Europe, specifically visiting France, England, and Holland, before returning to the University of Königsberg as a professor of anatomy and botany.

Near the end of his life, Loesel was working on his opus; a Flora of the natural plants of Prussia. However, he was plagued by poor health and never saw to its completion. The manuscript was published by Loesel's son of the same name as Plantas in Borussia sponte nascentes e manuscriptis Parentis mei divulgo Johannes Loeselius (transl. Plants growing spontaneously in Prussia from the manuscripts of my parent Johannes Loeselius) in 1654. Loesel died on 30 March 1655 in Königsberg, Prussia.

== Legacy ==
Loesel was honored in the name of the genus Loeselia by Linnaeus in 1753, as well as in the orchid species Liparis loeselii and mustard species Sisymbrium loeselii.

His Plantas in Borussia was again revised in 1703 by Johann Gottsched.
