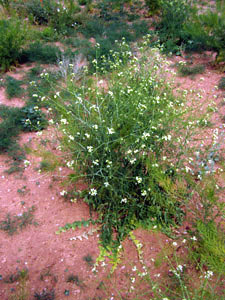

Scientific classification
- Kingdom: Plantae
- Clade: Tracheophytes
- Clade: Angiosperms
- Clade: Eudicots
- Clade: Rosids
- Order: Brassicales
- Family: Brassicaceae
- Genus: Sisymbrium
- Species: S. altissimum

Binomial name
- Sisymbrium altissimum L.

= Sisymbrium altissimum =

Species of flowering plant

Sisymbrium altissimum is a species of Sisymbrium. The plant is native to the western part of the Mediterranean Basin and is widely naturalized throughout most of the world, including all of North America. After maturity it forms a tumbleweed. Common names of the plant include Jim Hill mustard, tall tumblemustard, tall mustard, tumble mustard, tumbleweed mustard, tall sisymbrium, and tall hedge mustard.

== Description ==
Tumble mustard forms an upright but delicate-looking plant, with slender, much-branched stems, growing up to 1.5 metres (5 feet) in height. Its stem leaves are divided into thin, linear lobes, while the basal leaves are broader and pinnately compound. The flowers are inconspicuous and only 6.4 millimetres (1/4 inch) wide. They have four usually yellow petals and four narrow, curved sepals. The seedpods are slender and long (5–10 centimetres or 2–4 in). The plant germinates in winter or early spring, with a lengthy blooming period. At maturity it dies, uproots, and tumbles in the wind, spreading its seeds.

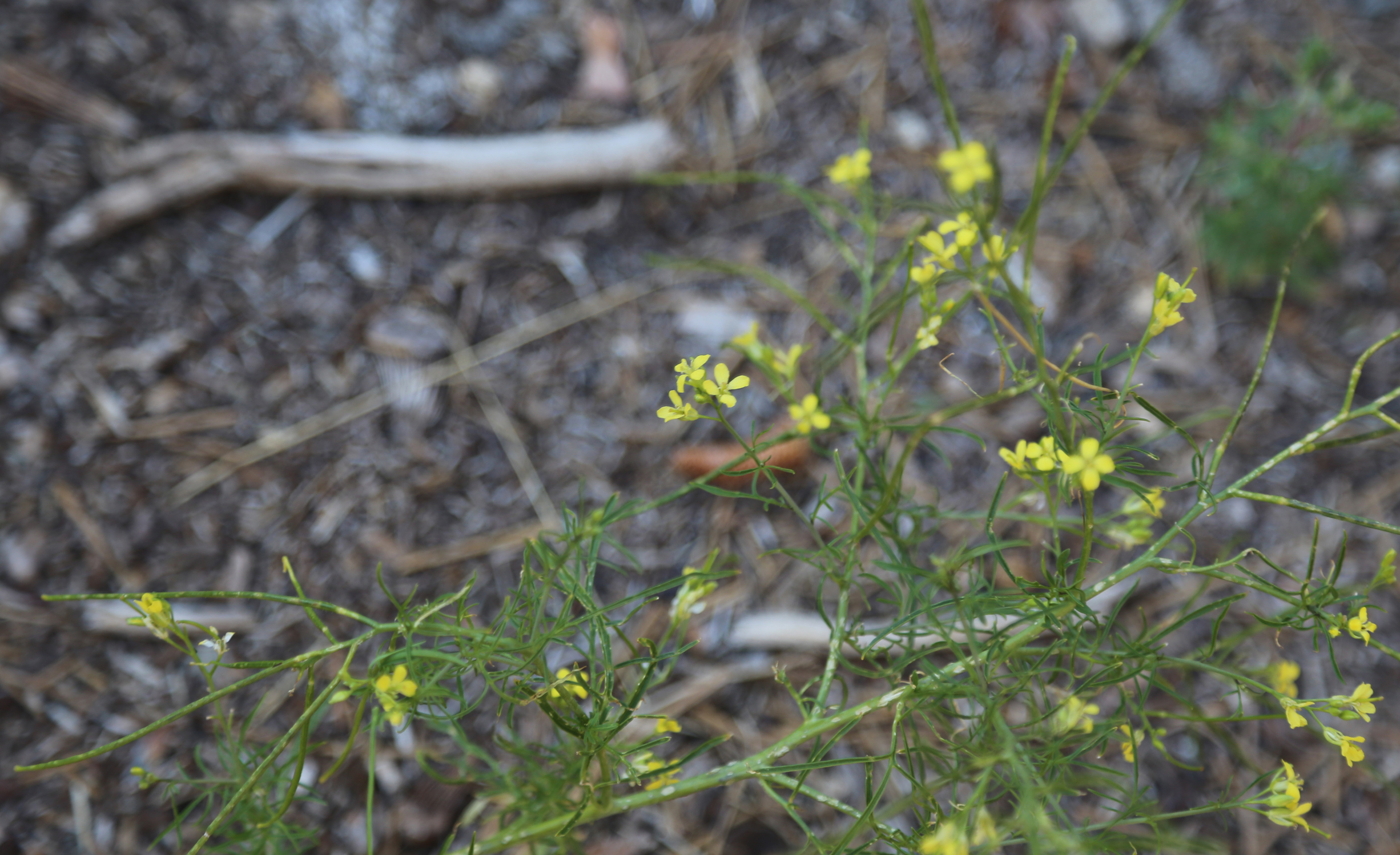
Branches and flowers

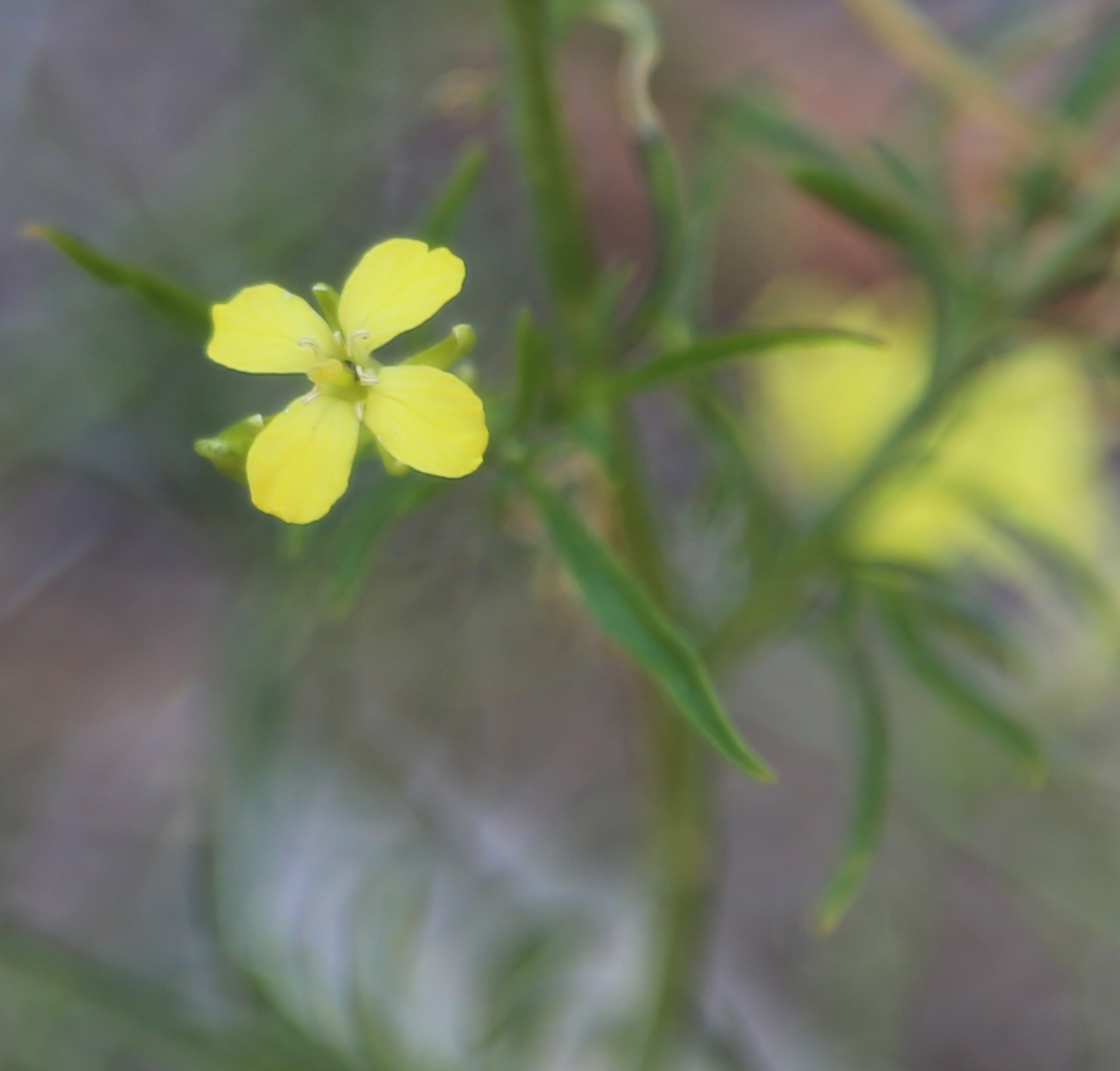
Closeup of tiny flower

== Taxonomy ==
The common name 'Jim Hill mustard' is after James J. Hill, a Canadian-American railroad magnate, due to a farmers' tall tale about the seeds having been spread via his railroads.

== Distribution and habitat ==
The plant is native to the western part of the Mediterranean Basin in Europe and Northern Africa and is widely naturalized throughout most of the world, including all of North America. It was probably introduced into North America as a contaminant of seed crops.

== Ecology ==
The plant grows in soils of all textures, even sand.

== Uses ==
The leaves are spicy enough to make wasabi but can also be mixed into salads and other dishes.
