= Yury Savenko =

Russian politician (1961–2020)

Yury Savchenko
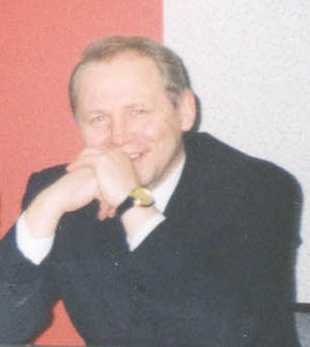

3rd Mayor of Kaliningrad
- In office 11 November 1998 – 7 November 2007
- Preceded by: Igor Kozhemyakin
- Succeeded by: Alexander Yaroshuk

Deputy of the 5th State Duma
- In office 2007–2011

Personal details
- Born: Yury Alekseyevich Savenko; 26 May 1961 Kaliningrad, U.S.S.R
- Died: 31 July 2020 (aged 59) Moscow, Russia
- Party: United Russia
- Profession: Politician, Military Officer

Yury Savenko (Russian: Юрий Алексеевич Савенко; 26 May 1961 – 31 July 2020) was a Russian politician. He served as the mayor of Kaliningrad from 1998 to 2007 and was a member of the State Duma from 2007 to 2011.

== Biography ==
Yury Savenko was born on 26 May 1961 in Kaliningrad. He graduated from the Kiev Naval Political College. In 1995, he graduated from the Russian Academy of State Service under the President of Russia.

In 1985, he entered the military and served as a deputy political officer for a minesweeper unit in the Soviet Navy Pacific Fleet and advanced to the rank of Captain 1st rank.

He entered politics straight from the military when he was elected to the municipal council of Korsakov, Sakhalin Oblast, later becoming the deputy chairman of the council. In 1991, the Governor of Sakhalin Oblast appointed him as Mayor. In 1994, the mayor of Kaliningrad offered him the opportunity to return to his hometown to serve as vice mayor of the city.

In 1998, Savenko was elected as mayor of Kaliningrad. He was re-elected in 2002 with 61% of the vote.

In 2007, Savenko was elected to the State Duma from Kaliningrad Oblast. He served one term in the Fifth Session.

In 2010, Savenko was nominated as a candidate for Governor of Kaliningrad Oblast; however, Russian President Dmitry Medvedev selected Nikolay Tsukanov to head the region. He was not renominated to run for the Duma in 2011, finishing second in the primary election. At the end of his term, Savenko was appointed as the head of the Kaliningrad representative office in Moscow. He served in that role until 2012.

In 2012, he declined to run again for mayor.

On 5 January 2020, Savenko sustained head injuries in a fall and went into a coma. On 31 July 2020, Savenko died at a hospital in Moscow at the age of 59.
