= Alexander Yaroshuk =

Russian politician

- Александр Ярошук
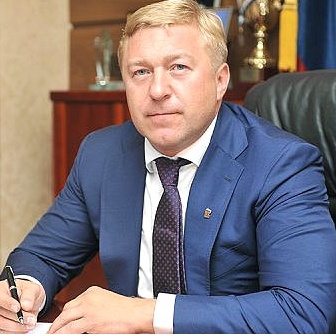

Russian Federation Senator from Kaliningrad Oblast
- Incumbent
- Assumed office 21 October 2021
- Preceded by: Aleksey Korotkov

Member of the State Duma for Kaliningrad Oblast
- In office 9 September 2018 – 9 October 2021
- Preceded by: Aleksey Silanov
- Succeeded by: Marina Orgeyeva
- Constituency: Central constituency (No. 98)

Mayor of Kaliningrad
- In office 2 December 2007 – 21 March 2018
- Preceded by: Yury Savenko
- Succeeded by: Aleksey Silanov

Personal details
- Born: 15 November 1965 (age 60) Kaliningrad, RSFSR, USSR
- Party: United Russia
- Spouse: Zhanna (div. 2013)
- Children: 4
- Education: Kaliningrad Higher Naval School; International Management Institute of Saint Petersburg (MBA); RANEPA

Aleksandr Georgyevich Yaroshuk (Russian: Александр Георгиевич Ярошук; born 15 November 1965) is a Russian politician. He has represented the legislative power, the Kaliningrad Oblast Duma, of Kaliningrad Oblast in the Federation Council since 21 October 2021. He was previously a member of the State Duma for Kaliningrad's Central constituency between 2018 and 2021, having been returned in a 2018 by-election.

== Career ==
Yaroshuk was mayor of Kaliningrad from 2012 to 2018. On 21 October 2021, Yaroshuk was elected by the Kaliningrad Oblast Duma to represent the oblast's legislative body on the Federation Council.

=== Sanctions ===
He was sanctioned by the UK government on 15 March 2022 in relation to the Russo-Ukrainian War.
