= Ladushkin =

Town in Kaliningrad Oblast, Russia

Ladushkin Ладушкин
- Town
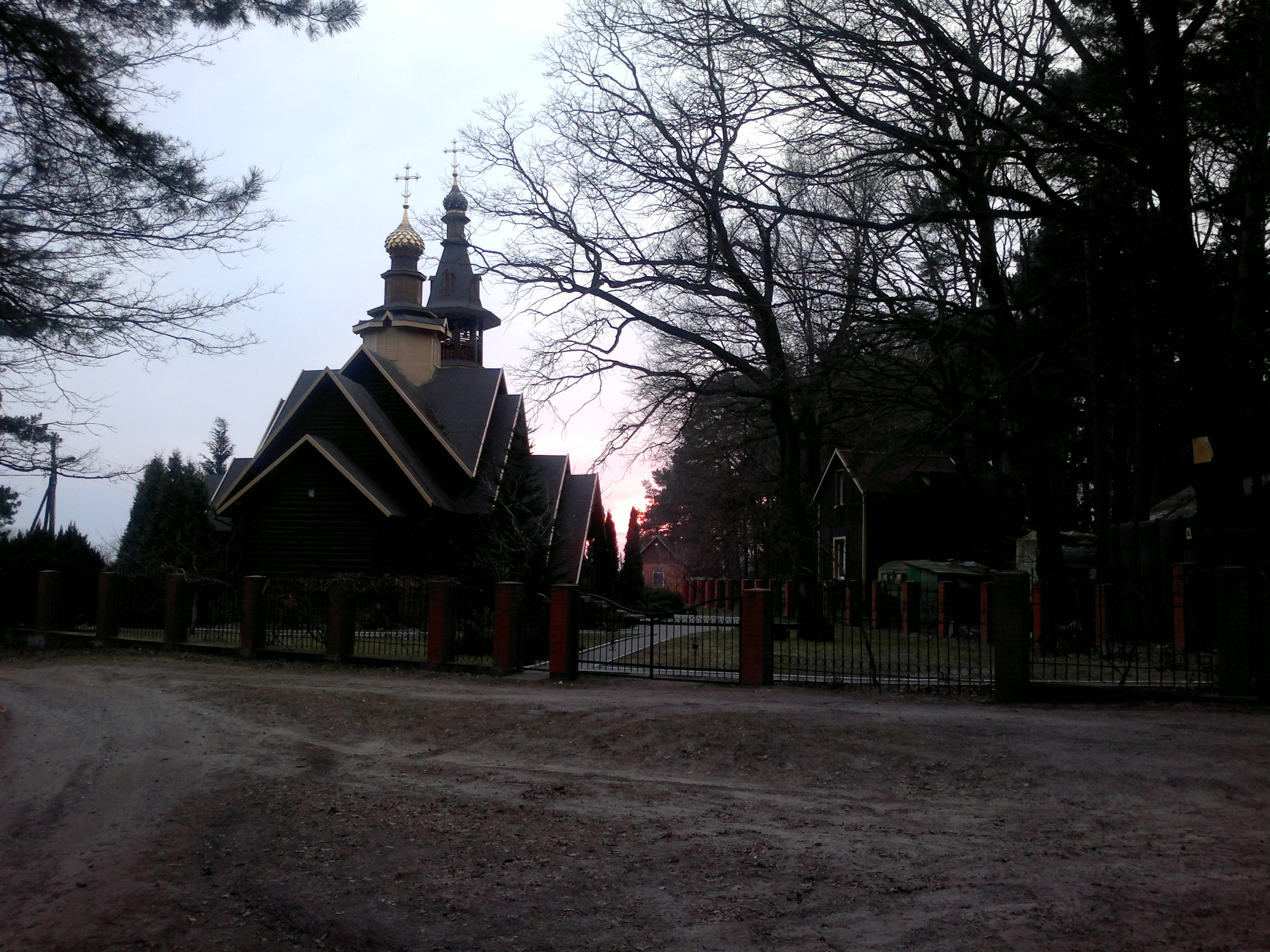

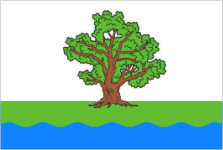
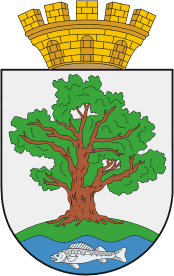
- Flag Coat of arms
- Interactive map of Ladushkin
- Location of Ladushkin Ladushkin (Kaliningrad Oblast)
- Coordinates: 54°35′N 20°11′E
- Country: Russia
- Federal subject: Kaliningrad Oblast
- Founded: 1314
- Elevation: 10 m (33 ft)

Population (2010 Census)
  - Total: 3,787
  - Estimate (2023): 3,634 (−4%)

Administrative status
  - Subordinated to: town of oblast significance of Ladushkin
  - Capital of: town of oblast significance of Ladushkin

Municipal status
  - Urban okrug: Ladushkinsky Urban Okrug
  - Capital of: Ladushkinsky Urban Okrug
- Time zone: UTC+2 (MSK–1)
- Postal code: 238460
- Dialing code: +7 40156
- OKTMO ID: 27711000001
- Website: archive.today/20110624054444/http://www.ladushkin.gov39.ru/

Ladushkin (Russian: Ладу́шкин; German: Ludwigsort; Lithuanian: Liudvigsortas; Polish: Ludwinów) is a town in Kaliningrad Oblast, Russia, located between Kaliningrad and the Polish border. Population figures: 3,787 (2010 census); 3,796 (2002 census); 3,108 (1989 Soviet census).

== History ==
It was founded as Ludwigsort (lit. Ludwig's/Louis' place) in 1314 and is situated not far from the shores of the Vistula Lagoon and the ruins of the medieval Balga Castle erected by the Teutonic Knights. In 1454, King Casimir IV Jagiellon incorporated the region to the Kingdom of Poland upon the request of the Prussian Confederation, which rebelled against the Teutonic Order. After the subsequent Thirteen Years' War (1454–1466), the settlement was a fief of Poland held by the Teutonic Knights until 1525, and by secular Ducal Prussia afterwards. From the 18th century, it was part of the Kingdom of Prussia, and from 1871 it was also part of Germany, within which it was administratively located in the province of East Prussia.

After the transfer of the town to the Russian Soviet Federative Socialist Republic following World War II, it was renamed Ladushkin in 1946 after the Red Army soldier Ivan Ladushkin (ru:Ладушкин, Иван Мартынович) who was killed nearby during the East Prussian Offensive in the previous year.

== Administrative and municipal status ==
Within the framework of administrative divisions, it is, together with two rural localities, incorporated as the town of oblast significance of Ladushkin—an administrative unit with the status equal to that of the districts. As a municipal division, the town of oblast significance of Ladushkin is incorporated as Ladushkinsky Urban Okrug.
