= Ushakovo, Novomoskovsky Rural Okrug, Guryevsky District, Kaliningrad Oblast =

Ushakovo Ушако́во
- Rural locality
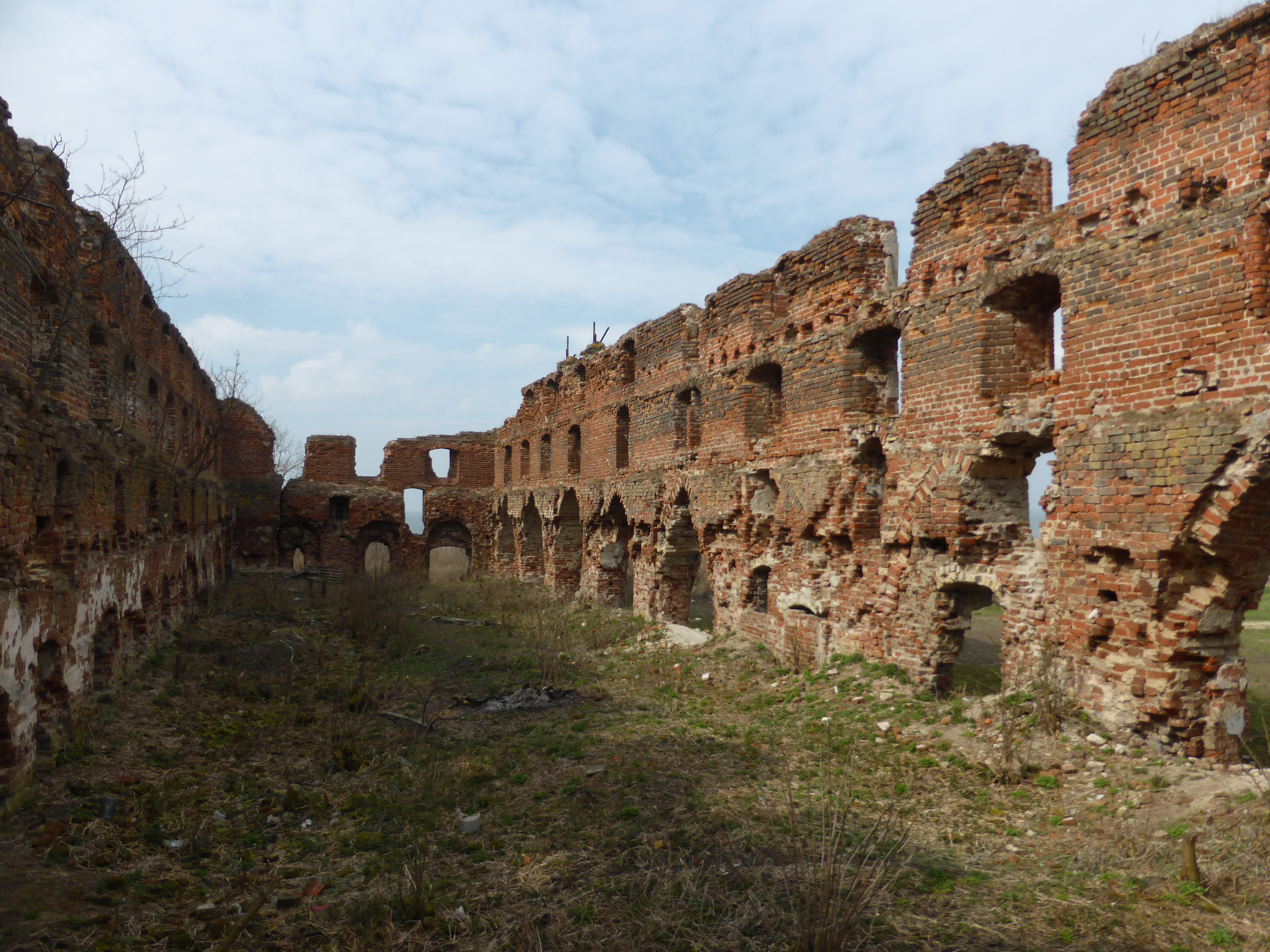
- Castle ruins
- Interactive map of Ushakovo
- Location of Ushakovo Ushakovo (European Russia) Ushakovo (Russia)
- Coordinates: 54.613°N 20.249°E
- Country: Russia
- Federal subject: Kaliningrad Oblast
- Administrative district: Guryevsky District
- Founded: 1266 (Julian)

Population (2010 Census)
  - Total: 812
  - Estimate (2011): 812 (0%)
- Time zone: UTC+2 (MSK–1)
- OKTMO ID: 27707000626

Ushakovo (Russian: Ушако́во; German: Brandenburg (Frisches Haff) or Brandenburg in Ostpreußen; Polish: Pokarmin; Lithuanian: Pokarviai) is a village in the Russian exclave Kaliningrad Oblast. It is situated at the mouth of the Prokhladnaya River at the Vistula Lagoon.

== History ==
The Battle of Pokarwis between pagan Prussians and the Teutonic Knights took place nearby in 1261. The Teutonic Knights founded the village as Brandenburg to honor Otto III, Margrave of Brandenburg who supported the order in the Prussian Crusade, and erected a castle in 1266. It became known as "Brandenburg (Frisches Haff)" and "Brandenburg in Ostpreußen" to differentiate it from Brandenburg an der Havel. In 1454, the region was incorporated by King Casimir IV Jagiellon to the Kingdom of Poland upon the request of the Prussian Confederation. After the subsequent Thirteen Years' War, the longest of all Polish–Teutonic wars, since 1466 it formed part of Poland as a fief held by the Teutonic Order, and after 1525 held by secular Ducal Prussia. From the 18th century it formed part of the Kingdom of Prussia, from 1871 it was also part of Germany. After Germany's defeat in World War II, it passed to Soviet Russia.

== Notable people ==
- Johannes Loesel (1607–1655), German botanist

== See also ==
- Brandenburg Gate (Kaliningrad)
