= Guryevsky District, Kaliningrad Oblast =

Guryevsky District Гурьевский район (Russian)
- District
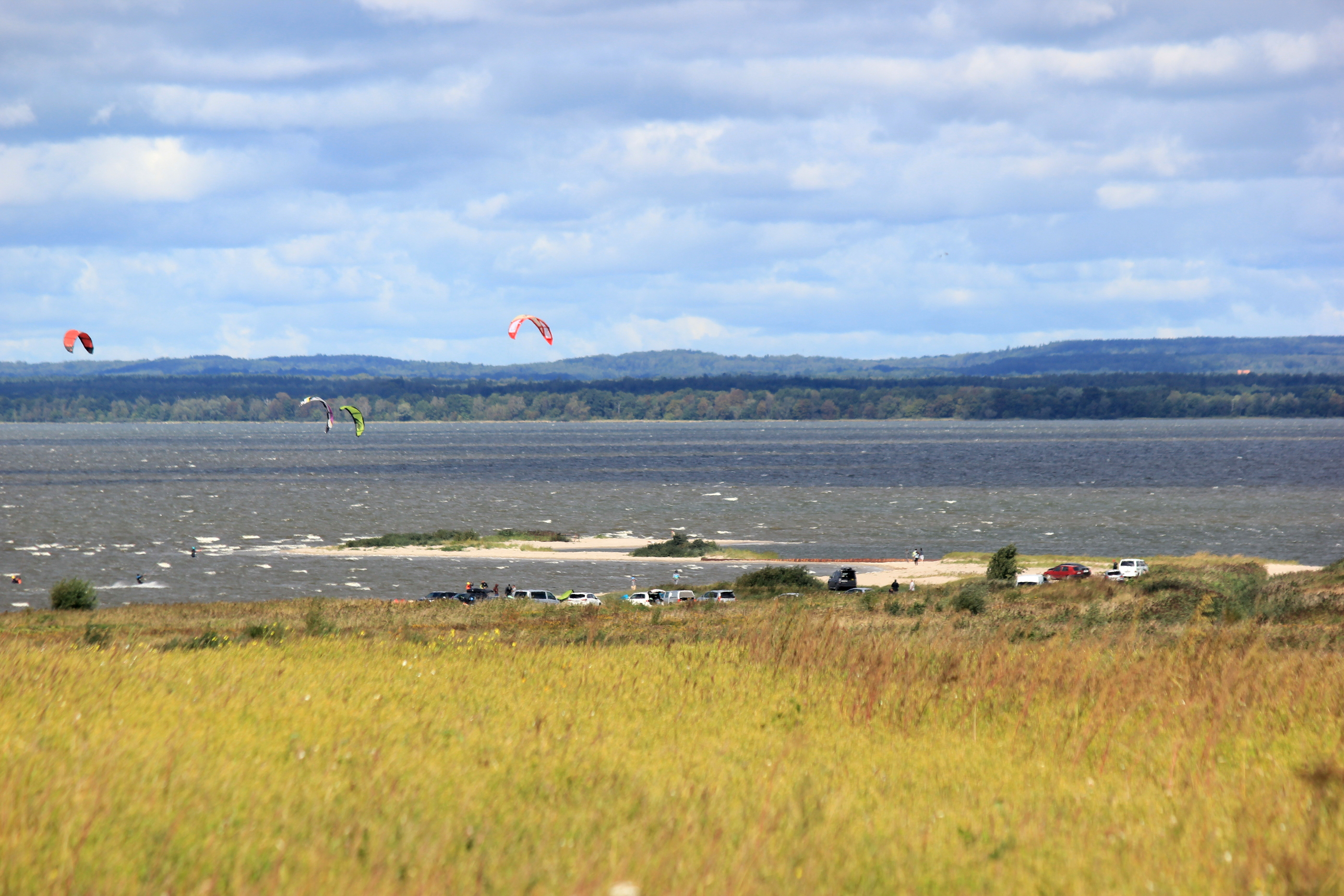
- View of the Vistula Lagoon, Guryevsky District

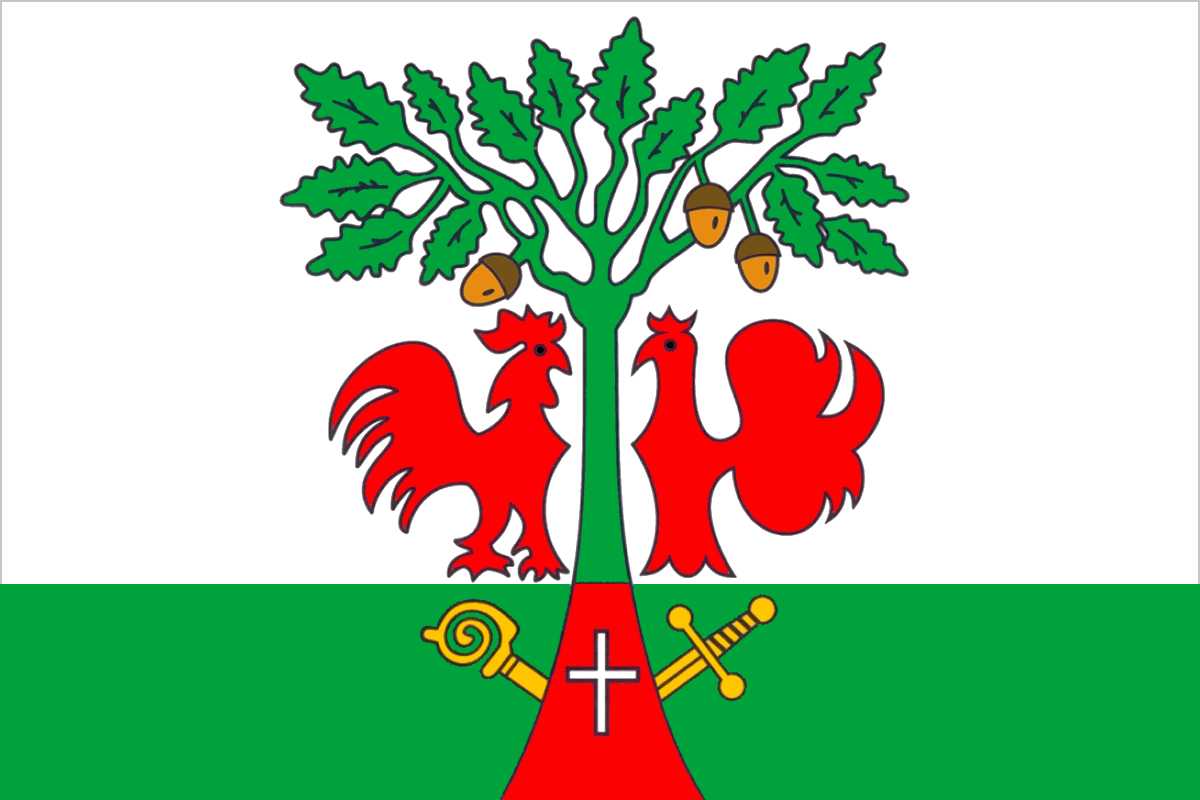
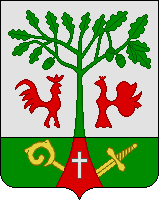
- Flag Coat of arms
- Location of Guryevsky District in Kaliningrad Oblast
- Coordinates: 54°46′N 20°36′E
- Country: Russia
- Federal subject: Kaliningrad Oblast
- Established: 1946
- Administrative center: Guryevsk

Area
  - Total: 1,284 km^{2} (496 sq mi)

Population (2010 Census)
  - Total: 52,988
  - Density: 41.27/km^{2} (106.9/sq mi)
  - Urban: 23.5%
  - Rural: 76.5%

Administrative structure
  - Administrative divisions: 1 Towns of district significance, 7 Rural okrugs
  - Inhabited localities: 1 cities/towns, 146 rural localities

Municipal structure
  - Municipally incorporated as: Guryevsky Urban Okrug
- Time zone: UTC+2 (MSK–1)
- OKTMO ID: 27707000
- Website: http://gurievsk.gov39.ru/

Guryevsky District (Russian: Гу́рьевский райо́н) is an administrative district (raion), one of the fifteen in Kaliningrad Oblast, Russia. As a municipal division, it is incorporated as Guryevsky Urban Okrug. It is located in the west of the oblast. The area of the district is 1,284 square kilometers (496 sq mi). Its administrative center is the town of Guryevsk. Population: 52,988 (2010 census); 47,330 (2002 Census); 39,148 (1989 Soviet census). The population of Guryevsk accounts for 23.5% of the district's total population.

== Geography ==
The district is situated around Kaliningrad, the administrative center of the oblast. For this reason the main railway lines and roads pass through the district.

To the north the district reaches the Curonian Lagoon, to the southwest—the Vistula Lagoon. In the west, parted from the rest of the district by Kaliningrad, the town of Svetly is located on the Vistula Lagoon.

== Administrative and municipal status ==
Within the framework of administrative divisions, Guryevsky District is one of the fifteen in the oblast. The town of Guryevsk serves as its administrative center.

As a municipal division, the district has been incorporated as Guryevsky Urban Okrug since May 31, 2013. Prior to that date, the district was incorporated as Guryevsky Municipal District, which was subdivided into one urban settlement and seven rural settlements, including Orekhovka.
