= 2024 Kaliningrad Oblast gubernatorial election =

Election

- 6–8 September 2024
- Turnout: 42.17%
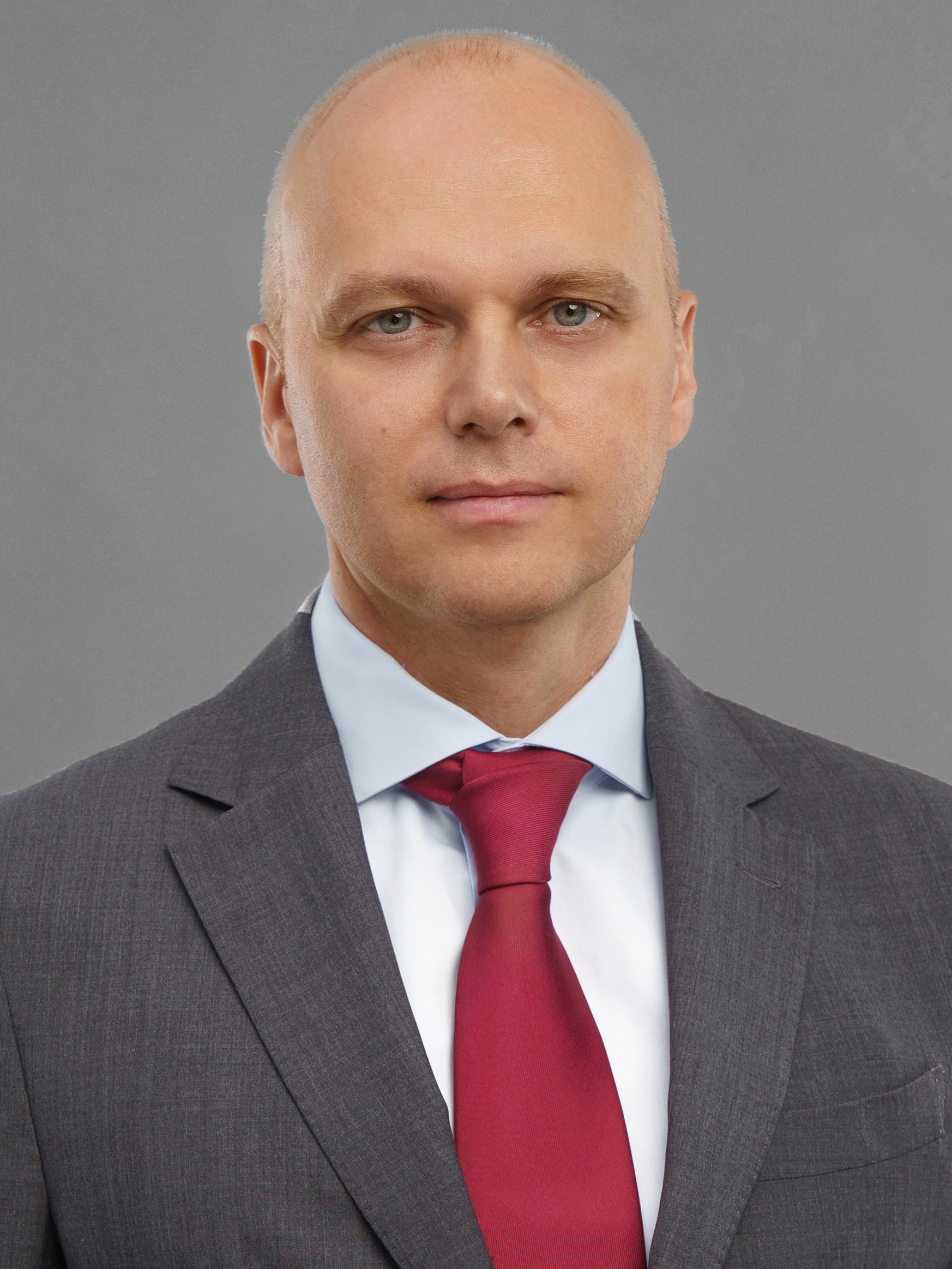

		LDPR
Candidate	Aleksey Besprozvannykh	Yevgeny Mishin
Party	United Russia	LDPR
Popular vote	270,919	33,670
Percentage	76.55%	9.51%
	CPRF
Candidate	Maksim Bulanov	Yury Shitikov
Party	CPRF	SR–ZP
Popular vote	23,249	20,791
Percentage	6.57%	5.87%
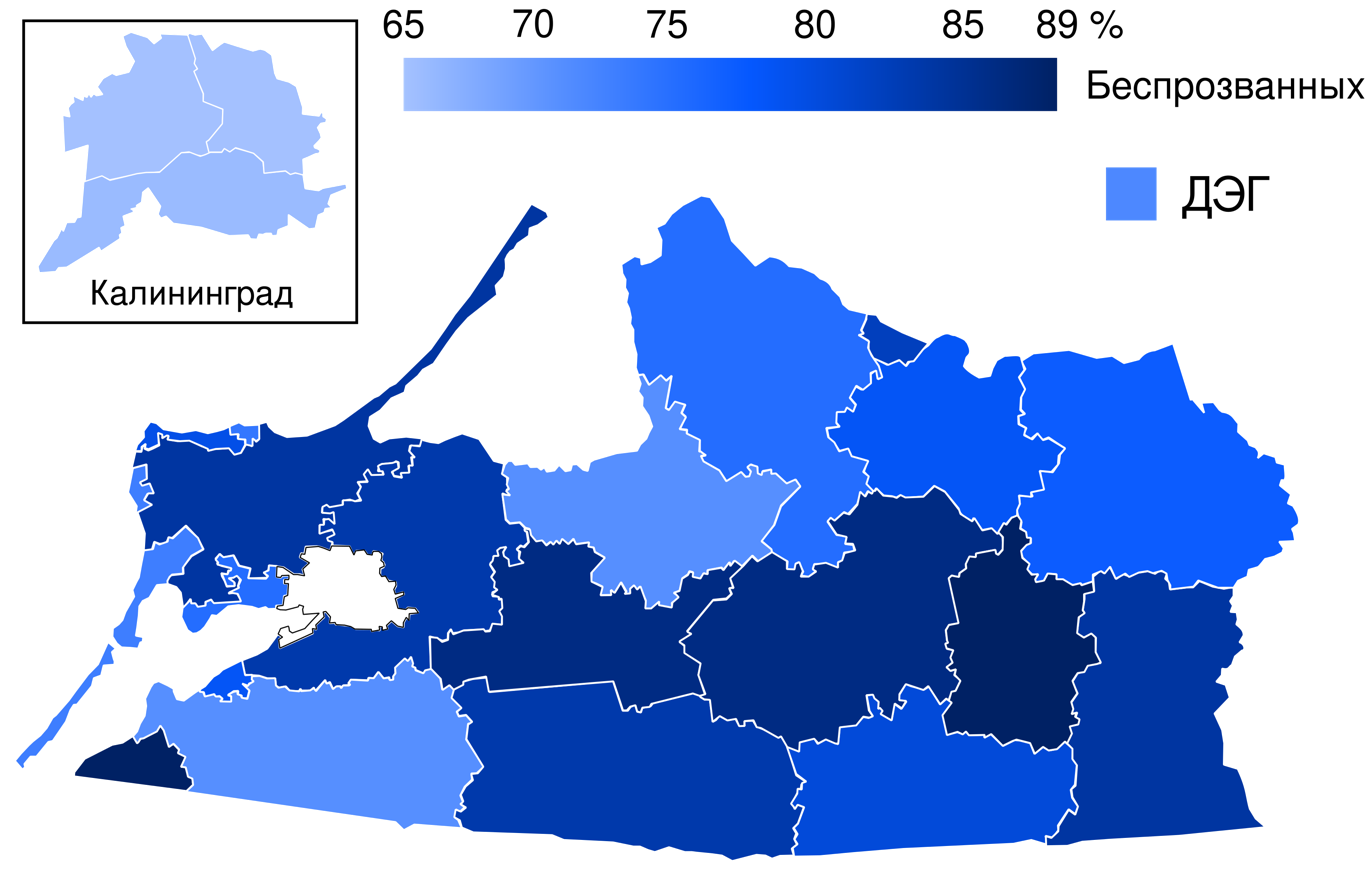
- 2024 Kaliningrad Oblast gubernatorial election results by municipality
Governor before election
Aleksey Besprozvannykh (acting)
Independent
Governor-elect
Aleksey Besprozvannykh
United Russia

The 2024 Kaliningrad Oblast gubernatorial election took place on 6–8 September 2024, on common election day. Acting Governor Aleksey Besprozvannykh was elected for a full term in office.

== Background ==
Anton Alikhanov was appointed acting Governor of Kaliningrad Oblast in October 2016 after Yevgeny Zinichev resigned form the post due to family reasons. Alikhanov won the election for a full with 81.06% of the vote and easily won reelection for a second term in 2022 with 80.21%.

In late April 2024 several media outlets reported that Governor Anton Alikhanov could receive a position in the Government of Russia, however, Alikhanov himself later denied those rumours and reaffirmed his intention to remain in Kaliningrad Oblast. Nevertheless, less than a week later it was reported that Governor Alikhanov is being considered for Minister of Industry and Trade or Minister of Economic Development. On May 11, 2024, re-appointed Prime Minister Mikhail Mishustin nominated Governor Anton Alikhanov to serve in his second cabinet as Minister of Trade and Industry, replacing Denis Manturov, who was elevated as First Deputy Prime Minister of Russia. State Duma Committee on Industry and Trade supported Alikhanov nomination on May 12, while the full chamber voted 430–0–0 to approve Alikhanov as new Minister of Industry and Trade two days later.

After his nomination, Governor Alikhanov left Kaliningrad on May 12, 2024, leaving First Deputy Governor Sergey Yeliseyev as acting Governor until the temporary replacement be appointed by the President. Initially Vice Governor of Saint Petersburg Vasily Pikalyov was considered the frontrunner to replace Alikhanov as Governor of Kaliningrad Oblast, however, Pikalyov was appointed Head of the Federal Customs Service of Russia on May 14. Other mentioned candidate included Yeliseyev and Deputy Minister of Industry and Trade Aleksey Besprozvannykh. On May 15 President Vladimir Putin appointed Aleksey Besprozvannykh as acting Governor of Kaliningrad Oblast.

== Candidates ==
In Kaliningrad Oblast candidates for Governor can be nominated only by registered political parties. Candidate for Governor of Kaliningrad Oblast should be a Russian citizen and at least 30 years old. Candidates for Governor should not have a foreign citizenship or residence permit. Each candidate in order to be registered is required to collect at least 8% of signatures of members and heads of municipalities. Also gubernatorial candidates present 3 candidacies to the Federation Council and election winner later appoints one of the presented candidates.

=== Declared ===
Candidate name, political party		Occupation	Status	Ref.
Aleksey Besprozvannykh; United Russia		Acting Governor of Kaliningrad Oblast (2024–present); Former Deputy Minister of Industry and Trade (2017–2024)	Registered	
Maksim Bulanov; Communist Party		Member of Legislative Assembly of Kaliningrad Oblast (2021–present); 2022 gubernatorial candidate	Registered	
Yevgeny Mishin; Liberal Democratic Party		Member of Legislative Assembly of Kaliningrad Oblast (2016–present); 2015, 2017 and 2022 gubernatorial candidate	Registered	
Yury Shitikov; SR–ZP		Member of Legislative Assembly of Kaliningrad Oblast (2006–2011, 2012–2016, 2021–present); Attorney; 2022 gubernatorial candidate	Registered	
Roman Morozov; Yabloko	Roman Morozov	Attorney	Failed to qualify	

=== Eliminated at convention ===
- Nina Fyodorova (United Russia), Member of Legislative Assembly of Kaliningrad Oblast (2021–present)

=== Candidates for Federation Council ===
Gubernatorial candidate, political party	Candidates for Federation Council	Status
Aleksey Besprozvannykh; United Russia	* Yekaterina Manyuk, Kaliningrad Regional Museum of History and Arts director * Yevgeny Morozov, Member of Legislative Assembly of Kaliningrad Oblast (2021–present) * Alexander Shenderyuk–Zhidkov, incumbent Senator (2022–present)	Registered
Maksim Bulanov; Communist Party	* Rustam Kasumov, Member of Zelenogradsk Council of Deputies (2020–present) * Sergey Ruzmetov, Member of Legislative Assembly of Kaliningrad Oblast (2021–present) * Artyom Vertepov, Member of Legislative Assembly of Kaliningrad Oblast (2021–present)	Registered
Yury Shitikov; SR–ZP	* Leonid Kobyak, individual entrepreneur * Vladimir Skypnik, associate professor * Georgy Tsukan, Member of Guryevsky District Council of Deputies (2022–present)	Registered

== Finances ==
All sums are in rubles.

Financial Report	Source	Besprozvannykh	Bulanov	Mishin	Morozov	Shitikov
First		10,030,000	6,000	506,000	58,800	50,000
Final		14,230,000	3,580,526	1,006,100	58,800	530,000

== Results ==
Summary of the 6–8 September 2024 Kaliningrad Oblast gubernatorial election results
Candidate	Party	Votes	%
Aleksey Besprozvannykh (incumbent)	United Russia	270,919	76.55
Yevgeny Mishin	Liberal Democratic Party	33,670	9.51
Maksim Bulanov	Communist Party	23,249	6.57
Yury Shitikov	A Just Russia – For Truth	20,791	5.87
Valid votes		348,629	98.50
Blank ballots		5,293	1.50
Total		353,922	100.00
Turnout		353,922	42.17
Registered voters		839,206	100.00

Governor Besprozvannykh re-appointed incumbent Senator Alexander Shenderyuk–Zhidkov (United Russia) to the Federation Council.

== See also ==
- 2024 Russian regional elections
