= Politics of Kaliningrad Oblast =

The current Governor of Kaliningrad Oblast is Alexey Besprozvannykh, who succeeded Yevgeny Zinichev in 2016. The latest elections to the region's legislative body, the 40-seat Kaliningrad Oblast Duma, were held in September 2021.

The EU and Russia have had a serious political debate over the oblast territory. The enlargement of the EU in 2004, through which Poland and Lithuania became member states, meant that the oblast now has land borders only with the EU. Issues of security have been at the forefront of debate, with high relevance to the Schengen Agreement.

== Regionalism ==
After the collapse of the Soviet Union, some intellectuals and government officials in the oblast openly discussed the region separating from Russia. In the mid-1990s, Yuri Matochkin, the oblast's first post-Soviet governor, demanded a special relationship with the EU and threatened a referendum on secession, abetting fears in Moscow about the centrifugal forces of separatism. His attempts at elevating the oblast's status to that of a sovereign republic associated with the Russian Federation yielded no results. Around the same time, the secessionist Baltic Republican Party, banned in 2005, aimed at establishing the oblast as the "fourth Baltic state". However, an organized secessionist movement has never emerged there and surveys indicate strong support for remaining a part of Russia.

== Social unrest in 2009-2010 ==
From October 2009 to January 2010 several demonstrations took place in the oblast, initially against a significant increase with retroactive application of the tax on vehicles imported from the European Union, thus threatening local business. But after the second demonstration the demands extended to the resignation of Governor Georgy Boos and of the United Russia members of the regional council. Opposition parties and civic organizations like Solidarnost took part in these demonstrations. Although the first meeting on 24 October 2009 only gathered around 500 people, the second one on 12 December 2009 numbered 3 to 5,000 participants, the third one on 30 January 2010 from 10 to 12,000 people. Banners were deployed with slogans such as "Stop increasing the tariffs. We're against the government's antisocial policies and United Russia. It's Putin who's responsible", "Georgy [Boos] - we're ashamed that you're a biker [the slogan is being held up by bikers]/ United Russia has united against Russian citizens.", "You've overeaten, you've stolen too much, now it's time to serve your time", "Bring back governors' elections". Despite the first protest, the Kaliningrad regional Duma adopted a decision to raise the vehicle tax by an average of 25 percent, but rescinded on 28 January 2010. On 28 September 2010 governor Boos was replaced by the Russian Federation government by a new governor, Nikolay Tsukanov. The leader of the political coalition of the opposition, Konstantin Doroshok, a businessman mostly involved in importing cars, retreated from the movement on February 2. The local leader of the Movement "For fair elections" (Russian: ЗА ЧЕСТНЫЕ ВЫБОРЫ!), Andrei Nyrko, but also independent deputy Solomon Ginzburg, openly stated in interviews that Doroshok either had been bought or had been brought under pressure by the FSB. He was elected to the regional Duma at the 13 March 2011 elections as an independent candidate in a single seat constituency.

== List of the Oblast's governors since the end of the Soviet Union ==
1. Yuri Matochkin (appointed, September 1991 – 1996)
2. Leonid Gorbenko (elected, 1996 - November 2000)
3. Vladimir Yegorov (elected, November 2000 - 12 November 2005)
4. Georgy Boos (proposed by President Vladimir Putin to the Kaliningrad Oblast duma and approved soon after this, 12 November 2005 – 27 September 2010)
5. Nikolay Tsukanov (appointed, 27 September 2010 – 28 July 2016)
6. Yevgeny Zinichev (acting, 28 July 2016 - 6 October 2016)
7. Anton Alikhanov (acting, 6 October 2016 – 10 September 201
8. Sergei Yeliseyev (acting, 14 May 2024 – 15 May 2024)
9. Alexey Besprozvannykh (acting, 15 May 2024 –)

== Federal elections ==
At the 2011 legislative election, the Communist Party of the Russian Federation took 31% of the votes in the city of Kaliningrad and Putin's United Russia only 21%, but the results in the rest of oblast were favorable to United Russia. According to Igor Revin, regional deputy for the CPRF, the electoral process in the city was under severe scrutiny of observers, but in peripheric cities like Sovetsk the electoral rigging was extensive. According to Sergei Rybin, of the US-funded NGO Golos, "without rigging, the CPRF would have won the election in the whole region".

=== Constituencies ===
- Kaliningrad constituency (No.97)
- Central constituency (No.98)

== Separatism ==
The Baltic Republic (or Land of Amber/Yantarny Krai) is a proposed state within the borders of Kaliningrad Oblast. The idea was mainly supported by the Baltic Republican Party which was dissolved in 2005 and was one of the few openly separatist parties, which were allowed to run in the elections. Members of the Baltic Republican Party were present in Kaliningrad Oblast Duma until the party lost its status as a political party.

Currently, the idea is supported by Kaliningrad Public Movement, which is represented on the Free Nations of Post-Russia Forum, and the Respublika movement. Baltic separatists advocate decommunization and the restoration of historic German city names.

In 2022, the Governor of Kaliningrad Oblast said that there was an attempt to create a “German autonomy” in Kaliningrad by western agents to destabilize the region. It was one of the first mentions of separatism in Russia by governors after the invasion of Ukraine.

Baltic separatism is based on civic nationalism. The movement uses symbols based on the old flag of Königsberg.

=== Opinion polls and electoral performance ===
In 2023, members of the Free Nations of Post-Russia Forum organized an online independence referendum for some of the regions of Russia, the data, however, cannot be fully trusted as the actual numbers are not publicly released. It should also be noted that the website was banned in Russia. Despite all that, the project still has limited support from the Ukrainian Rada.

2023 Internet vote
Do you support Königsberg independence from the Russian Federation?
Yes	No
72,1%	27,9%
Claimed participants: 95567 (19,4% of the population)

Electoral performance of the Baltic Republican Party
Election	Seats	+/-	Government
2000 Kaliningrad Oblast Duma	1 / 31	▲1	Opposition

== See also ==
- Kaliningrad Oblast Election, 2011
