= 2026 Kaliningrad Oblast legislative election =

Regional legislative election in Russia

- 18–20 September 2026

All 40 seats in the Legislative Assembly 21 seats needed for a majority
- Turnout: 40.98% ▲7.35 pp
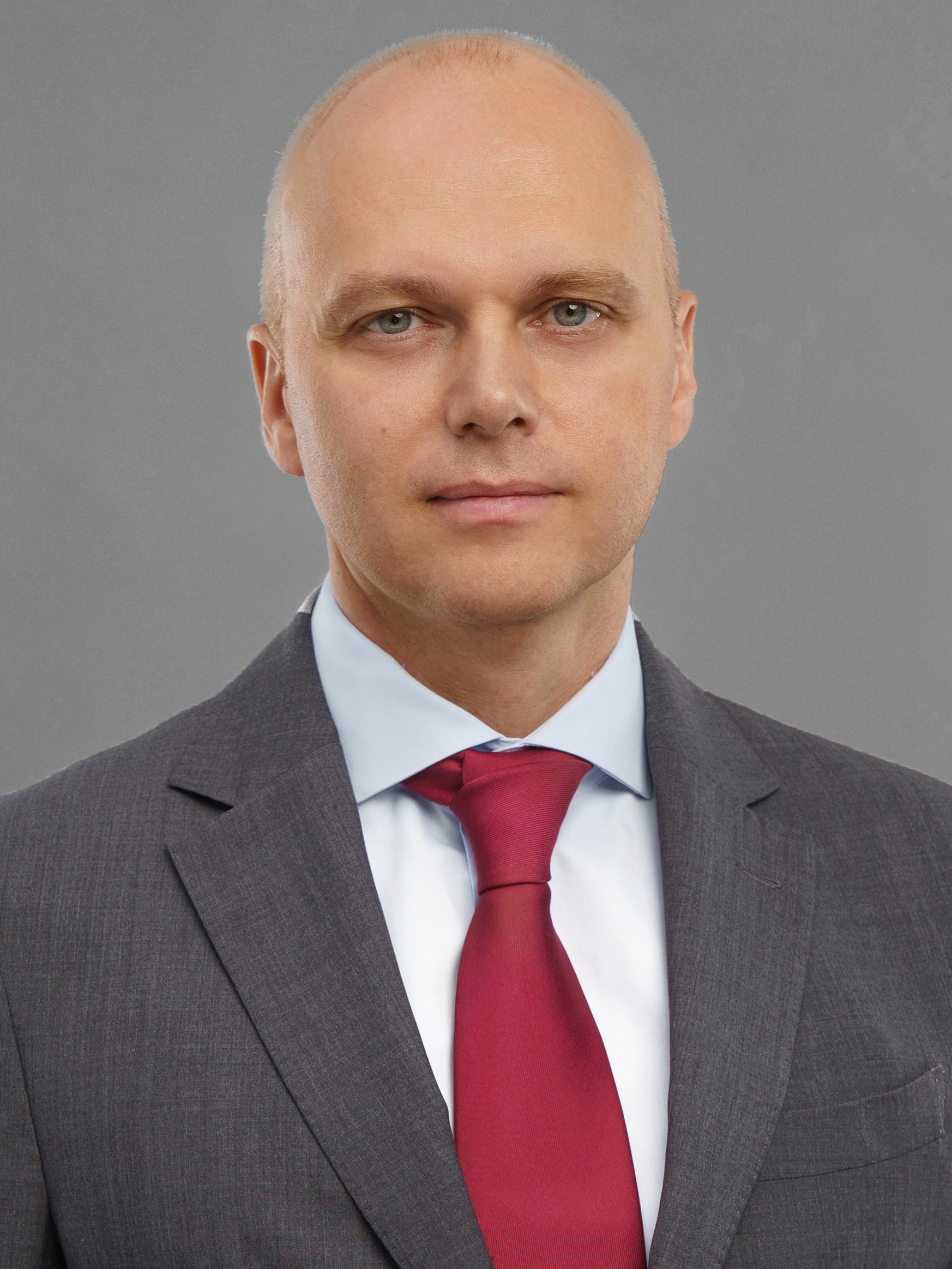

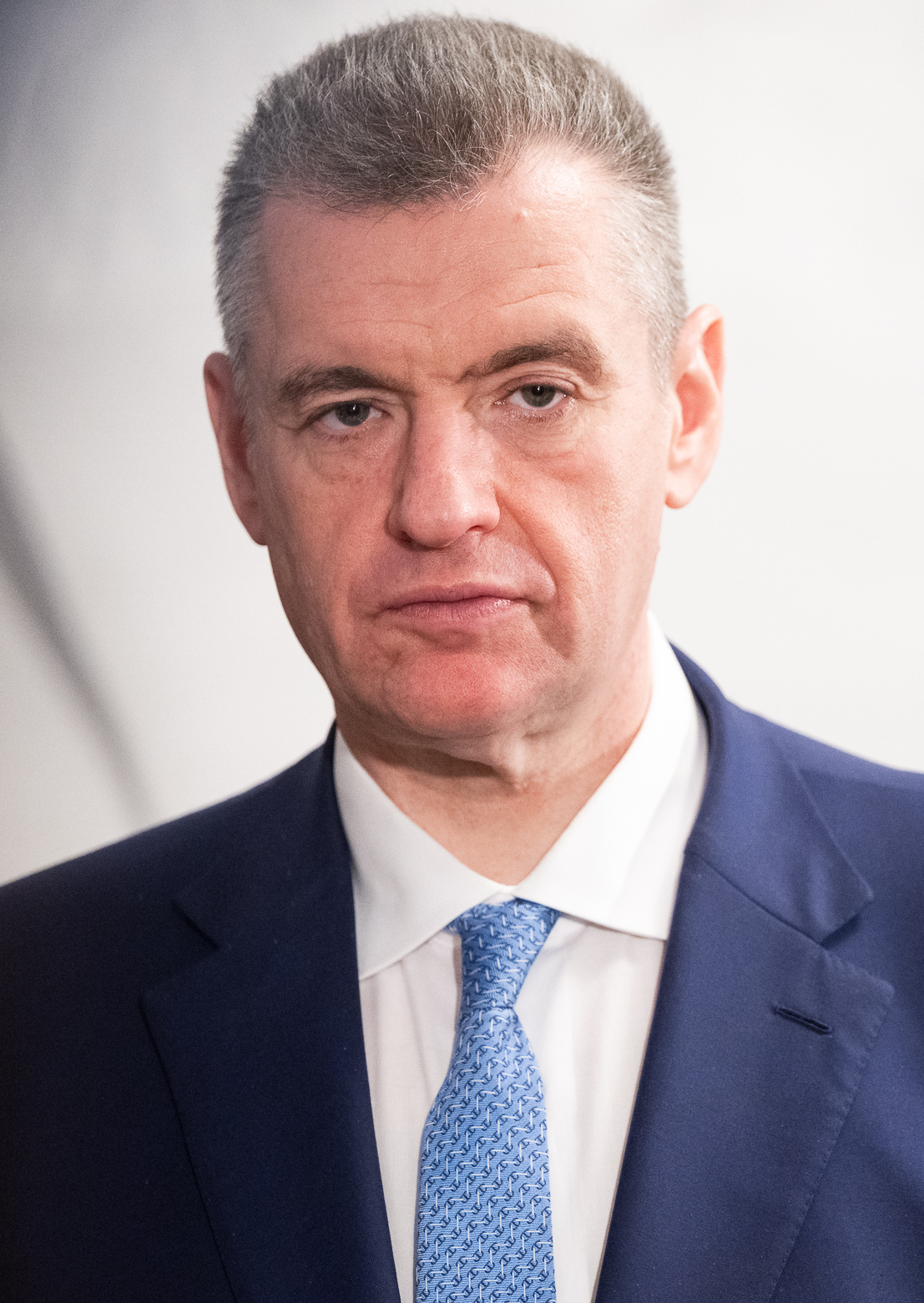

	Majority party	Minority party	Third party
		CPRF	NL
Candidate	Alexey Besprozvannykh	Maksim Bulanov	Yulia Figulyarnaya
Party	United Russia	CPRF	New People
Last election	38.95%, 29 seats	19.03%, 6 seats	Failed to qualify
Seats won	32	3	2
Seat change	▲3	▼3	New
Popular vote	226,274	56,457	49,793
Percentage	52.78%	13.17%	11.61%
Swing	▲13.83 pp	▼5.86 pp	New
	Fourth party	Fifth party	Sixth party
			RPPSS
Candidate	Leonid Slutsky	Yury Shitikov	Yevgeny Khramov
Party	LDPR	A Just Russia	Party of Pensioners
Last election	11.22%, 2 seats	11.27%, 2 seats	6.38%, 1 seat
Seats won	2	1	0
Seat change	Steady	▼1	▼1
Popular vote	43,306	22,391	13,665
Percentage	10.10%	5.22%	3.19%
Swing	▼1.12 pp	▼6.05 pp	▼3.19 pp
	Seventh party
	CR
Candidate	Aleksey Kolobov
Party	Communists of Russia
Last election	4.23%, 0 seat
Seats won	0
Seat change	Steady
Popular vote	7,164
Percentage	1.67%
Swing	▼2.56 pp
Chairman before election
Andrey Kropotkin
United Russia
Elected Chairman
Andrey Kropotkin
United Russia
Senator before election
Alexander Yaroshuk
United Russia
Senator after election
Alexander Yaroshuk
United Russia

The 2026 Legislative Assembly of Kaliningrad Oblast election took place on 18–20 September 2026, on common election day, coinciding with the 2026 Russian legislative election. All 40 seats in the Legislative Assembly were up for re-election.

United Russia increased its overwhelming majority in the Legislative Assembly, winning 52.8% of the vote and all 20 single-mandate constituencies. Communist Party of the Russian Federation finished second but lost half of its former six-member delegation. A Just Russia and Russian Party of Pensioners for Social Justice lost half of its previous vote share with Party of Pensioners losing its faction and A Just Russia retaining a single deputy. New People entered the Legislative Assembly for the first time, winning 11.6% of the vote and two seats.

== Electoral system ==
Under current election laws, the Legislative Assembly is elected for a term of five years, with parallel voting. 20 seats are elected by party-list proportional representation with a 5% electoral threshold, with the other half elected in 20 single-member constituencies by first-past-the-post voting. Seats in the proportional part are allocated using the Imperiali quota, modified to ensure that every party list, which passes the threshold, receives at least one mandate.

== Candidates ==
=== Party lists ===
To register regional lists of candidates, parties need to collect 0.5% of signatures of all registered voters in Kaliningrad Oblast.

The following parties were relieved from the necessity to collect signatures:

- United Russia
- Communist Party of the Russian Federation
- Liberal Democratic Party of Russia
- A Just Russia
- New People
- Russian Party of Pensioners for Social Justice
- Communists of Russia
- Yabloko
- Rodina

№	Party	Oblast-wide list	Candidates	Territorial groups	Status
1	United Russia	Aleksey Besprozvannykh • Andrey Kropotkin • Natalia Ishchenko	63	20	Registered
2	New People	Yulia Figulyarnaya • Maria Korzhinevskaya • ~~Yevgeny Sibakov~~	68	20	Registered
4	Liberal Democratic Party	Leonid Slutsky • Yevgeny Mishin • Semyon Kurbatov	72	20	Registered
5	Party of Pensioners	Yevgeny Khramov • Vladimir Vukolov • Yury Lyapin	50	20	Registered
6	A Just Russia	Yury Shitikov • Pavel Fyodorov	51	14	Registered
7	Communist Party	Maksim Bulanov • Regina Raynis • Rustam Kasumov	58	20	Registered
8	Communists of Russia	Aleksey Kolobov • Yelena Gladilina • Natalya Konovalova	63	20	Registered
~~3~~	Yabloko	Ivan Bolshakov • Roman Morozov • ~~Anton Hendrickson~~	32	11	Disqualified

Rodina, which participated in the last election, did not file. Russian Party of Pensioners for Social Justice was initially registered for the legislative election but was disqualified on August 26, 2026, by the Kaliningrad Oblast Court for violations at the party convention. Yabloko was also disqualified on August 28, 2026, for unlawful social media campaigning and financing violations.

On September 15, 2026, Supreme Court of Russia restored Russian Party of Pensioners for Social Justice's registration in the legislative election, however, all party candidates in single-mandate constituencies were still disqualified.

=== Single-mandate constituencies ===
20 single-mandate constituencies were formed in Kaliningrad Oblast. To register candidates in single-mandate constituencies need to collect 3% of signatures of registered voters in the constituency.

Number of candidates in single-mandate constituencies
Party	Candidates	
Party	Nominated	Registered
United Russia	20	20
Communist Party	16	15
A Just Russia	17	16
Liberal Democratic Party	19	16
Party of Pensioners	20	0
Communists of Russia	19	18
Yabloko	3	2
New People	21	17
Independent	2	0
Total	137	104

== Results ==
=== Results by party lists ===
Summary of the 18–20 September 2026 Legislative Assembly of Kaliningrad Oblast election results
Party	Party list					Constituency		Total	
Party	Votes	%	±pp	Seats	+/–	Seats	+/–	Seats	+/–
United Russia	226,274	52.78	▲13.83	12	▲2	20	▲1	32	▲3
Communist Party	56,457	13.17	▼5.86	3	▼2	0	▼1	3	▼3
New People	49,793	11.61	New	2	New	0	New	2	New
Liberal Democratic Party	43,306	10.10	▼1.12	2	Steady	0	Steady	2	Steady
A Just Russia	22,391	5.22	▼6.05	1	▼1	0	Steady	1	▼1
Party of Pensioners	13,665	3.19	▼3.19	0	▼1	—	—	0	▼1
Communists of Russia	7,164	1.67	▼2.56	0	Steady	0	New	0	Steady
Yabloko	–	–	–	–	–	0	Steady	0	Steady
Invalid ballots	9,652	2.25	▼1.67	—	—	—	—	—	—
Total	428,717	100.00	—	20	Steady	20	Steady	40	Steady
Turnout	428,717	40.98	▲7.35	—	—	—	—	—	—
Registered voters	840,992	100.00	—	—	—	—	—	—	—

Andrey Kropotkin (United Russia) was re-elected as Chairman of the Legislative Assembly, while incumbent Senator Alexander Yaroshuk (United Russia) was re-appointed to the Federation Council.

=== Results in single-member constituencies ===
==== District 1 ====
Summary of the 18–20 September 2026 Legislative Assembly of Kaliningrad Oblast election in District 1
Candidate	Party	Votes	%
Sergey Grigorenko	United Russia	4,979	32.45%
Roman Bezzubtsev	New People	2,865	18.67%
Vasily Mayneko	Communist Party	2,494	16.25%
Pavel Kobozev	Liberal Democratic Party	2,257	14.71%
Anton Vasilkov	A Just Russia	1,457	9.50%
Andrey Stopel	Communists of Russia	622	4.05%
Total		15,343	100%

==== District 2 ====
Summary of the 18–20 September 2026 Legislative Assembly of Kaliningrad Oblast election in District 2
Candidate	Party	Votes	%
Pavel Makarov	United Russia	5,520	33.01%
Stanislav Bochekalov	Communist Party	2,362	14.13%
Aleksey Stepanov	New People	2,085	12.47%
Dmitry Mamayev	Yabloko	2,052	12.27%
Semyon Kurbatov	Liberal Democratic Party	1,681	10.05%
Dmitry Sotsky	A Just Russia	1,387	8.29%
Aleksey Gryzun	Communists of Russia	1,004	6.00%
Total		16,722	100%

==== District 3 ====
Summary of the 18–20 September 2026 Legislative Assembly of Kaliningrad Oblast election in District 3
Candidate	Party	Votes	%
Yevgeny Verkholaz (incumbent)	United Russia	7,729	43.11%
Sergey Ruzmetov	Communist Party	3,500	19.52%
Aleksandr Kolmychek	Communists of Russia	2,939	16.39%
Pavel Fyodorov	A Just Russia	2,876	16.04%
Total		17,929	100%

==== District 4 ====
Summary of the 18–20 September 2026 Legislative Assembly of Kaliningrad Oblast election in District 4
Candidate	Party	Votes	%
Anatoly Avramenko	United Russia	5,270	30.77%
Anastasia Kruglikova	New People	3,282	19.16%
Rustam Kasumov	Communist Party	2,380	13.90%
Yelena Gladilina	Communists of Russia	2,369	13.83%
Anna Tryakina	Liberal Democratic Party	1,572	9.18%
Nikolay Kuzmin	A Just Russia	1,527	8.92%
Total		17,127	100%

==== District 5 ====
Summary of the 18–20 September 2026 Legislative Assembly of Kaliningrad Oblast election in District 5
Candidate	Party	Votes	%
Natalya Morozova	United Russia	5,643	33.23%
Sergey Voytekhovsky	Communist Party	3,231	19.02%
Ilya Kalinovsky	New People	3,031	17.85%
Sergey Sevostyanov	A Just Russia	1,760	10.36%
Mikhail Chernousko	Liberal Democratic Party	1,720	10.13%
Natalya Konovalova	Communists of Russia	949	5.59%
Total		16,983	100%

==== District 6 ====
Summary of the 18–20 September 2026 Legislative Assembly of Kaliningrad Oblast election in District 6
Candidate	Party	Votes	%
Yulia Taranova (incumbent)	United Russia	5,314	32.89%
Yevgeny Mishin	Liberal Democratic Party	2,513	15.55%
Roman Morozov	Yabloko	2,429	15.03%
Natalya Nalivayko	New People	2,240	13.86%
Aleksandr Brovko	Communists of Russia	1,698	10.51%
Sergey Shaporov	A Just Russia	1,141	7.06%
Total		16,157	100%

==== District 7 ====
Summary of the 18–20 September 2026 Legislative Assembly of Kaliningrad Oblast election in District 7
Candidate	Party	Votes	%
Yevgeny Morozov (incumbent)	United Russia	5,592	33.72%
Olga Marchik	New People	3,345	20.17%
Sergey Korobkov	Communist Party	2,390	14.41%
Vadim Filippov	Liberal Democratic Party	1,915	11.55%
Aleksey Kolobov	Communists of Russia	1,422	8.58%
Roman Shustin	A Just Russia	1,216	7.33%
Total		16,583	100%

==== District 8 ====
Summary of the 18–20 September 2026 Legislative Assembly of Kaliningrad Oblast election in District 8
Candidate	Party	Votes	%
Oleg Yermin	United Russia	6,247	39.44%
Vladimir Kovalev	New People	3,456	21.82%
Darya Kostina	Communists of Russia	2,769	17.48%
Andrey Lyzhov	Liberal Democratic Party	2,585	16.32%
Total		15,839	100%

==== District 9 ====
Summary of the 18–20 September 2026 Legislative Assembly of Kaliningrad Oblast election in District 9
Candidate	Party	Votes	%
Yury Samorodov (incumbent)	United Russia	6,873	40.62%
Dmitry Shamonov	New People	2,596	15.34%
Sergey Soldatov	Communists of Russia	2,240	13.24%
Aram Narinyan	Liberal Democratic Party	1,597	9.44%
Vasily Ponomarev	A Just Russia	1,542	9.11%
Edik Shellunts	Communist Party	1,466	8.66%
Total		16,922	100%

==== District 10 ====
Summary of the 18–20 September 2026 Legislative Assembly of Kaliningrad Oblast election in District 10
Candidate	Party	Votes	%
Andrey Kropotkin (incumbent)	United Russia	7,842	49.96%
Maksim Bulanov	Communist Party	2,751	17.53%
Kristina Mironova	New People	2,475	15.77%
Andrey Sokulin	Communists of Russia	990	6.31%
Veronika Lukyashko	A Just Russia	987	6.29%
Total		15,697	100%

==== District 11 ====
Summary of the 18–20 September 2026 Legislative Assembly of Kaliningrad Oblast election in District 11
Candidate	Party	Votes	%
Aleksey Mendrik	United Russia	9,376	41.00%
Igor Ivanovsky	New People	3,970	17.36%
Aleksandr Kuznetsov	A Just Russia	3,205	14.02%
Ruslan Burganshin	Liberal Democratic Party	3,100	13.56%
Igor Chubakov	Communists of Russia	2,199	9.62%
Total		22,866	100%

==== District 12 ====
Summary of the 18–20 September 2026 Legislative Assembly of Kaliningrad Oblast election in District 12
Candidate	Party	Votes	%
Larisa Shvalkene (incumbent)	United Russia	17,101	61.57%
Yaroslav Korobeynikov	Communist Party	4,289	15.44%
Natalya Shulga	A Just Russia	3,014	10.85%
Tatyana Chuvashenko	Communists of Russia	2,347	8.45%
Total		27,773	100%

==== District 13 ====
Summary of the 18–20 September 2026 Legislative Assembly of Kaliningrad Oblast election in District 13
Candidate	Party	Votes	%
Sergey Lyutarevich (incumbent)	United Russia	17,212	63.88%
Yakov Agatov	Liberal Democratic Party	3,158	11.72%
Aleksandr Bakov	Communist Party	2,747	10.20%
Yelena Mikhaylova	New People	2,235	8.29%
Anastasia Zhuravleva	Communists of Russia	960	3.56%
Total		26,944	100%

==== District 14 ====
Summary of the 18–20 September 2026 Legislative Assembly of Kaliningrad Oblast election in District 14
Candidate	Party	Votes	%
Aleksandr Orekhov (incumbent)	United Russia	17,324	67.03%
Leonid Yuditsky	Liberal Democratic Party	3,135	12.13%
Georgy Tsukan	A Just Russia	2,656	10.28%
Ivan Kalashnikov	New People	2,330	9.01%
Total		25,847	100%

==== District 15 ====
Summary of the 18–20 September 2026 Legislative Assembly of Kaliningrad Oblast election in District 15
Candidate	Party	Votes	%
Aleksey Martynets (incumbent)	United Russia	17,108	64.75%
Aleksandr Grinyayev	Communist Party	2,848	10.78%
Aleksandr Figulyarny	New People	1,866	7.06%
Boris Popov	Liberal Democratic Party	1,724	6.53%
Viktoria Kareva	Communists of Russia	1,030	3.90%
Viktoria Popova	A Just Russia	1,019	3.86%
Total		26,420	100%

==== District 16 ====
Summary of the 18–20 September 2026 Legislative Assembly of Kaliningrad Oblast election in District 16
Candidate	Party	Votes	%
Augenijus Abarius (incumbent)	United Russia	11,574	47.03%
Dmitry Tremyasov	Liberal Democratic Party	4,455	18.10%
Vitaly Knyazev	Communist Party	3,947	16.04%
Konstantin Bochkov	A Just Russia	2,740	11.13%
Aleksandr Sheshelovsky	Communists of Russia	1,352	5.49%
Total		24,608	100%

==== District 17 ====
Summary of the 18–20 September 2026 Legislative Assembly of Kaliningrad Oblast election in District 17
Candidate	Party	Votes	%
Aleksandr Nikulin	United Russia	13,879	57.52%
Svetlana Bivoyna	Liberal Democratic Party	3,912	16.12%
Natalya Dyuzhakova	New People	2,800	11.61%
Aleksandr Filimonov	Communists of Russia	2,441	10.12%
Total		24,127	100%

==== District 18 ====
Summary of the 18–20 September 2026 Legislative Assembly of Kaliningrad Oblast election in District 18
Candidate	Party	Votes	%
Valery Panchenko (incumbent)	United Russia	17,336	66.84%
Kirill Kolesnik	Communist Party	2,483	9.57%
Anastasia Sattarova	New People	1,811	6.89%
Vardan Gyulumyan	Liberal Democratic Party	1,471	5.67%
Dmitry Latushkin	A Just Russia	1,461	5.63%
Stanislav Teslenko	Communists of Russia	759	2.93%
Total		25,938	100%

==== District 19 ====
Summary of the 18–20 September 2026 Legislative Assembly of Kaliningrad Oblast election in District 19
Candidate	Party	Votes	%
Yekaterina Kanayeva (incumbent)	United Russia	18,617	77.16%
Yelena Kamayeva	New People	4,250	17.62%
Total		24,127	100%

==== District 20 ====
Summary of the 18–20 September 2026 Legislative Assembly of Kaliningrad Oblast election in District 20
Candidate	Party	Votes	%
Vadim Snigirev (incumbent)	United Russia	12,806	50.77%
Olesya Bormintseva	Liberal Democratic Party	3,272	12.97%
Kirill Konovalov	Communist Party	2,462	9.76%
Vitaly Afanasov	New People	2,412	9.56%
Valery Kornev	A Just Russia	1,923	7.62%
Marina Mironova	Communists of Russia	1,091	4.32%
Total		25,226	100%

=== Members ===
Incumbent deputies are highlighted with bold, elected members who declined to take a seat are marked with ~~strikethrough~~.

Constituency
No.	Member	Party
1	Sergey Grigorenko	United Russia
2	Pavel Makarov	United Russia
3	Yevgeny Verkholaz	United Russia
4	Anatoly Avramenko	United Russia
5	Natalya Morozova	United Russia
6	Yulia Taranova	United Russia
7	Yevgeny Morozov	United Russia
8	Oleg Yermin	United Russia
9	Yury Samorodov	United Russia
10	Andrey Kropotkin	United Russia
11	Aleksey Mendrik	United Russia
12	Larisa Shvalkene	United Russia
13	Sergey Lyutarevich	United Russia
14	Aleksandr Orekhov	United Russia
15	Aleksey Martynets	United Russia
16	Augenijus Abarius	United Russia
17	Aleksandr Nikulin	United Russia
18	Valery Panchenko	United Russia
19	Yekaterina Kanayeva	United Russia
20	Vadim Snigirev	United Russia

Party lists
Member	Party
~~Aleksey Besprozvannykh~~	United Russia
~~Natalia Ishchenko~~	United Russia
Kirill Sutyka	United Russia
Valery Gubarov	United Russia
Dmitry Kiselyov	United Russia
Aleksey Shemarov	United Russia
Alexander Yaroshuk	United Russia
Mikhail Verkholantsev	United Russia
Aleksandr Beigel	United Russia
Yury Schneider	United Russia
Mikhail Zatsepin	United Russia
Olga Krasnova	United Russia
Oleg Nosyrev	United Russia
Artyom Levakov	United Russia
Maksim Bulanov	Communist Party
Regina Raynis	Communist Party
Rustam Kasumov	Communist Party
Yulia Figulyarnaya	New People
Maria Korzhinevskaya	New People
~~Leonid Slutsky~~	Liberal Democratic Party
Yevgeny Mishin	Liberal Democratic Party
Semyon Kurbatov	Liberal Democratic Party
Yury Shitikov	A Just Russia

== See also ==
- 2026 Russian regional elections
