= Simsky =

Simsky (Russian: Симский; masculine), Simskaya (Симская; feminine), or Simskoye (Симское; neuter) is the name of several rural localities in the Republic of Bashkortostan, Russia:

- Simsky (rural locality), a village in Sakhayevsky Selsoviet of Karmaskalinsky District
- Simskoye (rural locality), a selo in Austrumsky Selsoviet of Iglinsky District
