= 2011 Kaliningrad Oblast election =

- 13 March 2011

All 40 seats in the Kaliningrad Oblast Duma 21 seats needed for a majority
- Turnout: 43.25 %
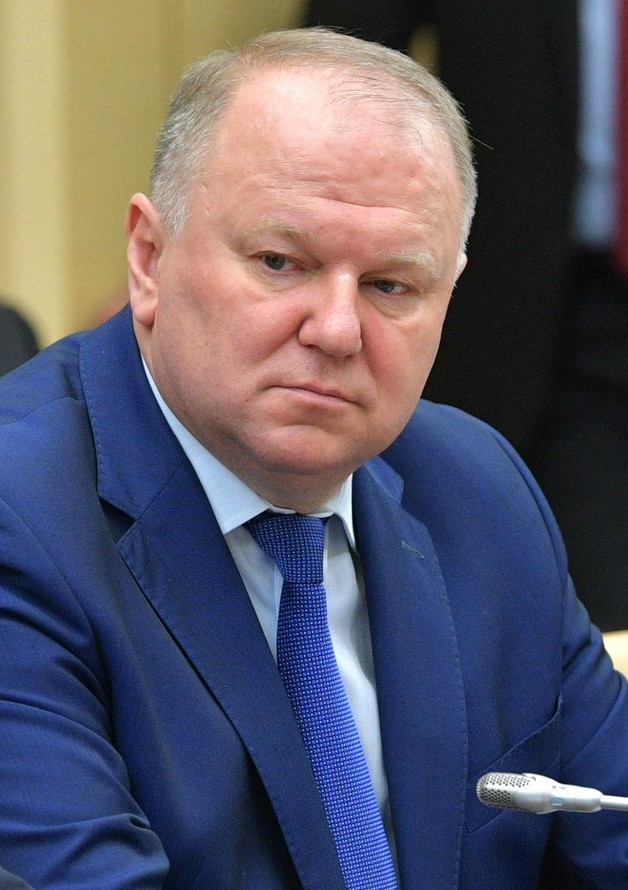

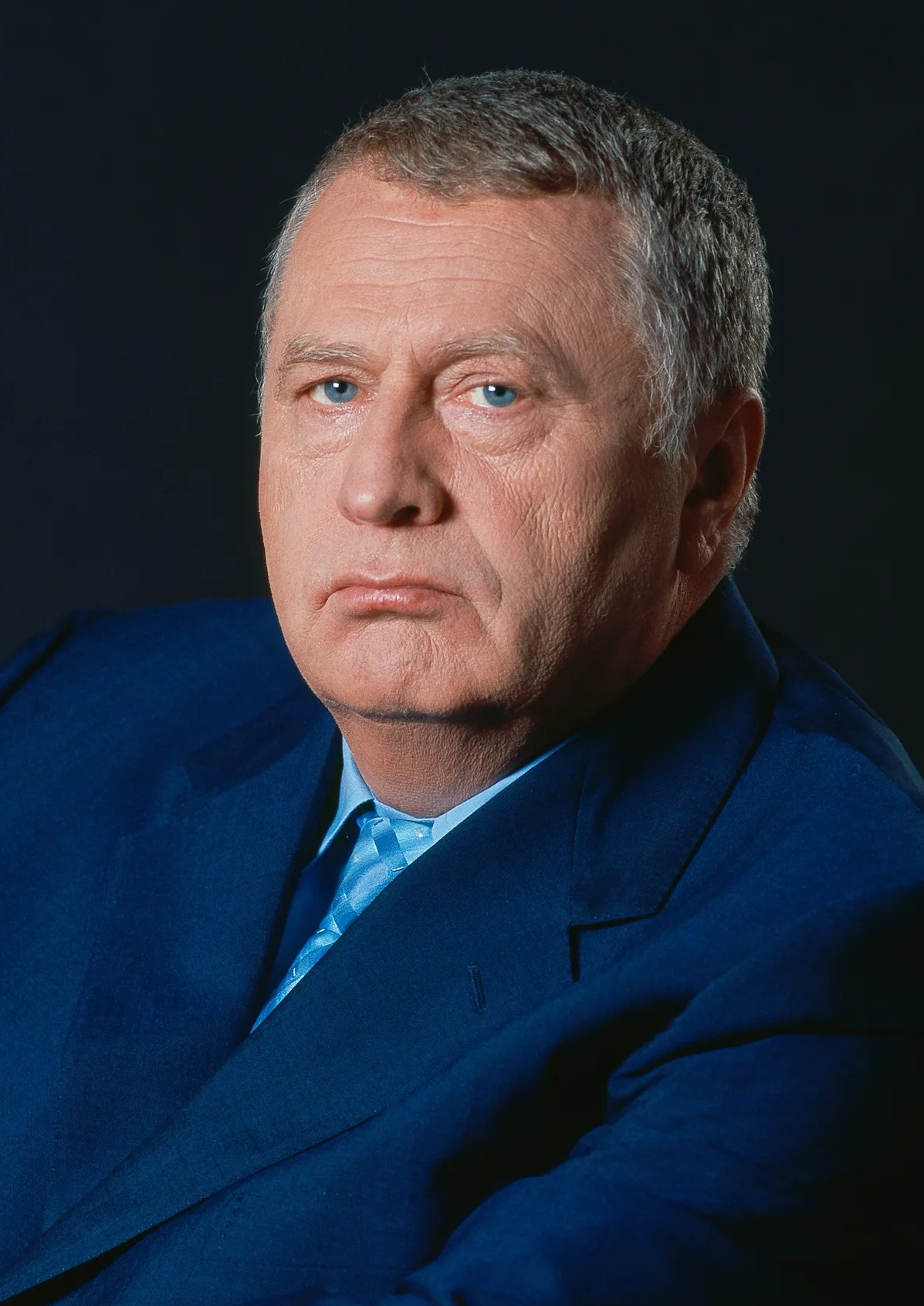
	Majority party	Minority party	Third party
Candidate	Nikolay Tsukanov	Vladimir Komoyedov	Vladimir Zhirinovsky
Party	United Russia	CPRF	LDPR
Seats won	24	6	2
Popular vote	134,651	70,675	41,534
Percentage	40.78 %	21,40 %	12.58 %
	Fourth party	Fifth party	Sixth party
	SR	PR	Yabloko
Candidate	Pavel Fyodorov	Mikhail Chesalin	Vladimir Vukolov
Party	A Just Russia	Patriots of Russia	Yabloko
Seats won	2	2	0
Popular vote	33,333	28,046	8,060
Percentage	10.09 %	8.49 %	2.44 %
	Seventh party
	NC
Party	Independents
Seats won	4
Chairman before election
Sergey Bulychev
United Russia
Elected Chairman
Marina Orgeyeva
United Russia

The election for the fifth term of the Kaliningrad Oblast Duma was held on 13 March 2011. 20 deputies were elected in single-mandate electoral constituencies, 20 others in the general regional constituency under proportional representation.

== Results ==
The participation grade was 42%. 4.22% of votes were declared invalid. The table hereafter lists the results of the valid votes.

Results of the regional elections of 13 March 2011
Party	Percentage	Direct seats	List seats	Total seats
United Russia	42.6%	15	9	24
Communist Party of the Russian Federation	22.3%	1	5	6
Liberal Democratic Party of Russia	13.1%	–	2	2
A Just Russia	10.5%	–	2	2
Patriots of Russia	8.9%	–	2	2
Yabloko	2.5%	–	–	–
Independents	–	4	–	4
Total	99.9%	20	20	40

Marina Orgejewa (United Russia) was elected as chairperson of the regional Duma. The representative of the regional Duma in the Federation Council of Russia is Nikolai Vlasenko (United Russia).

== Independent deputies ==
There are four independents deputies, elected in single-seat constituencies. The Russian Political Parties Act is very restrictive, a recognized political party must have at least 50,000 members and 45 regional branches with more than 500 members, so that non recognized political parties may not take part to elections unless through individual candidates. No local party is recognized.

- Konstantin Yurevich Doroshok, born 1 September 1969 in Vasilkovo (Kaliningrad Oblast). He is the leader of the Justice (Russian: Справедливость, Spravedlivost) organization, and coordinator of the local opposition coalition "Our Kaliningrad" which was formed during the 2009-2010 protests in Kaliningrad.
- Solomon Israilivich Ginzburg, born 25 September 1959 in Jēkabpils (Latvia), has been elected to the third (2000-2006) and fourth (2006-2011) regional dumas, and reelected to the fifth in 2011.
- Vytautas Valdemaras Lopata, born 19 November 1956 in Krasnoyarsk to a deported Lithuanian father and a Russian mother, is the local chairperson of the opposition Russian People's Democratic Union. He is also co-chairman of the Kaliningrad Public Movement – Respublika, a successor to the banned autonomist Baltic Republican Party. He was a member of the Democratic Party of Russia from 2001 to 2005, and beforehand of Yabloko from 1998 to 2001. He has been elected to the regional Duma in 2000, 2006 and 2011. He ran also as a Democratic Party of Russia candidate for the mayorship of Kaliningrad in 2002, for the State Duma of the Russian Federation in 2003 and again for the mayorship of Kaliningrad in 2007, but this time for the new Russian People's Democratic Union.
- Igor Petrovich Rudnikov, born 4 July 1965 in Dnipropetrovsk (Ukraine), has been elected to the third (2000-2006) and fourth (2006-2011) regional dumas, and reelected to the fifth in 2011 with 53.3% of the votes in his district where for the proportional elections the United Russia list got 24.5% of the vote, its lowest percentage in the whole Kaliningrad Oblast. He had been elected in 1996 to the City Council of Kaliningrad, and ran for mayor of Kaliningrad in 1998 and 2002.

== 2012 by-election ==
A by-election for the 13th single-seat constituency took place on 4 March 2012, in parallel with the Russian presidential election, amidst accusations of massive vote-buying e.g. by the candidate Arkady Korovikova, according to Vladimir Sultanov, a Kaliningrad Oblast Duma deputy from the Communist Party, who called the election an "orgy of vote-buying" and wrote a letter to President Dmitry Medvedev.

== See also ==
- Politics of Kaliningrad Oblast
