= Matochkin =

Matochkin may refer to:

- Yuri Matochkin, Russian politician
- Matochkin Strait
