= Baltic Republican Party =

Baltic Republican Party Балтийская республиканская партия
- Abbreviation: BRP (English); БРП (Russian)
- Leader: Rustam Vasiliev
- Founders: Sergei Pasko; Rustam Vasiliev
- Founded: 1 December 1993 (as BRP) 21 February 2005 (as Respublika) 21 February 2022 (as BRP)
- Dissolved: 3 December 2003 (deregistered) 21 February 2005 (as BRP)
- Headquarters: 20th Building, Schiller Street, Kaliningrad, Kaliningrad Oblast, Russia
- Newspaper: Delovaya zhizn (Business life)
- Membership (2005): ~500–600
- Ideology: Kaliningrad independence Social liberalism Pro-Europeanism; Anti-communism; Prussian nationalism Formerly: Kaliningrad autonomism
- Political position: Centre-right
- National affiliation: National Democratic Alliance
- International affiliation: Free Nations of Post-Russia Forum; Free Nations League
- Colours: White; Blue; Red; Yellow

Party flag

Website
- https://balticrepublic.party/

The Baltic Republican Party (BRP; Russian: Балтийская республиканская партия, romanized: Baltiyskaya respublikanskaya partiya), later known as Kaliningrad Public Movement – Respublika (Russian: Калининградское общественное движение – Республика, romanized: Kaliningradskoye obshchestvennoye dvizheniye – Respublika) or simply Respublika, is a movement within the Russian Federation's Kaliningrad Oblast that has used several political parties to promote its position of autonomy, and later separatism, of Kaliningrad as a "Baltic Republic."

== History ==
=== Baltic Republican Party (1993–2003) ===
The Baltic Republican Party was founded on 1 December 1993 in and lost its official status as a political party on 26 March 2003 due to the new Russian Law on political parties which requires that each party should have regional branches in at least half of the Russian Federation constituencies and at least 10,000 members in strength. An appeal was lost in February 2005 before the Constitutional Court of Russia. The main political purpose of the party was the establishment of an autonomous Baltic Republic instead of the Kaliningrad region, possibly total independence. It also wanted the old name Königsberg restored. Its leaders are Sergei Pasko and Rustam Vasiliev, with Pasko being the former head of the secretariat of the Governor of the Kaliningrad region Yuri Matochkin. The success of the early party is largely attributed to its support from well-known economists, lawyers and businessmen. The party had hoped that gaining Republican status in Russia hoping for independent foreign trade and partial redistribution of tax deductions.

=== Kaliningrad Public Movement – Respublika (2003–2021) ===
Following its outlawing the party transitioned into a social movement that supported parliamentarism, the independence of the branches of power, the decommunization of society, the renaming of Kaliningrad to Königsberg and the preservation of its cultural heritage.

In February 2005 the constituent congress of the Kaliningrad Public Movement – Respublika took place in Kaliningrad. It has the same objectives as the BRP, its co-chairmen are Sergei Pasko and Vitautas Lopata, an independent deputy of the regional Duma and local chairperson of the opposition Russian People's Democratic Union.

In 2010 the group demanded the simplification of the visa regime with European countries for residents of the Kaliningrad region. However, shortly after, the group's leadership had to flee Russia due to charges of violence against police officers at a rally.

=== Baltic Republican Party resurgence (2022–present) ===
The party saw a resurgence due to the buildup for the Russian Invasion of Ukraine, frequently collaborating with other separatist groups. On February 21, 2022, the party's coordinator Vadim Petrov tore up a copy of the Russian Constitution during a separatist rally in front of the Russian embassy in Warsaw, saying that Vladimir Putin was an illegitimate president for amending the constitution to rule for life. During the rally Petrov also delivered an ultimatum on behalf of the Baltic Republican Party stating that supporting illegitimate president Lukashenko and the invasion of Ukraine risks full-fledged war between Russia and NATO, and that the people of Kaliningrad do not want to spoil good neighborly relations with Poland and Lithuania. The ultimatum stated that if Russian troops did not pull out of Ukraine, if Russia does not stop supporting Lukashenko, and if Russia does not demilitarize Kaliningrad, the Baltic Republican Party will organize a referendum on secession from the Russian Federation.

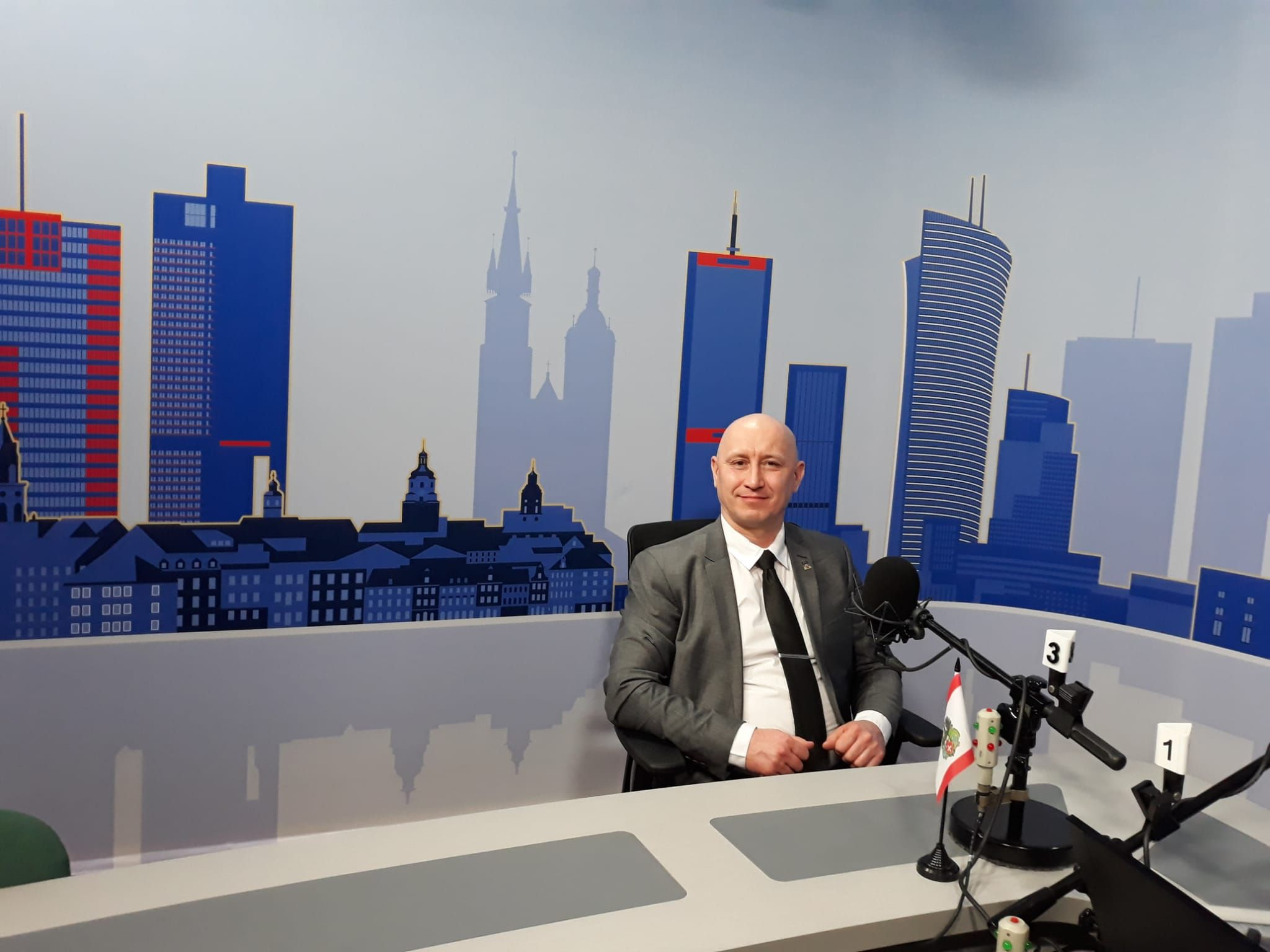
Vadim Petrov at the studio of the Polish Radio External Service

In 2023, party leader Rustam Vasiliev decried the increased isolation of the region following Russia's invasion of Ukraine. In the same interview, he declared that an increasing number of the region's residents were supportive of the party, and that a break from Moscow was ultimately inevitable. The party claims that Moscow is a barrier to the region's economic development and that the region "belongs to Europe". Vasiliev has repeatedly called for the separation of Kaliningrad as a Europe-leaning republic with Königsberg, the city's former German name, as its capital.

The party, alongside other movements affiliated with the Free Nations of Russia forum, has been designated a terrorist organization by the Russian Supreme Court in November 2024.

In October 2026, the Baltic Republican Party held a Restoration Conference dedicated to re-establishing the organization abroad. The conference outlined plans for the party's legal registration within the European Union, the development of a party statute, the promotion of Baltic regional identity among natives of the Kaliningrad region, and the prospective creation of a digital "Baltic ID" card for members of the Baltic diaspora.

== Election history ==
Kaliningrad Oblast Duma
Election	Votes	%	Seats	+/-	Government
2000	5,674	1.59	1 / 31	▲1	Opposition
