= Maksim Bulanov =

Russian politician

Maksim Bulanov is a member of the Legislative Assembly of Kaliningrad Oblast. He was the nominee for the CPRF for candidate in the 2022 Kaliningrad Oblast gubernatorial election. He lost the election to the United Russia candidate Anton Alikhanov, who was the incumbent governor of Kaliningrad Oblast. He got 4.88% of the vote.
