= 2022 Kaliningrad Oblast gubernatorial election =

- 9–11 September 2022
- Turnout: 38.49%
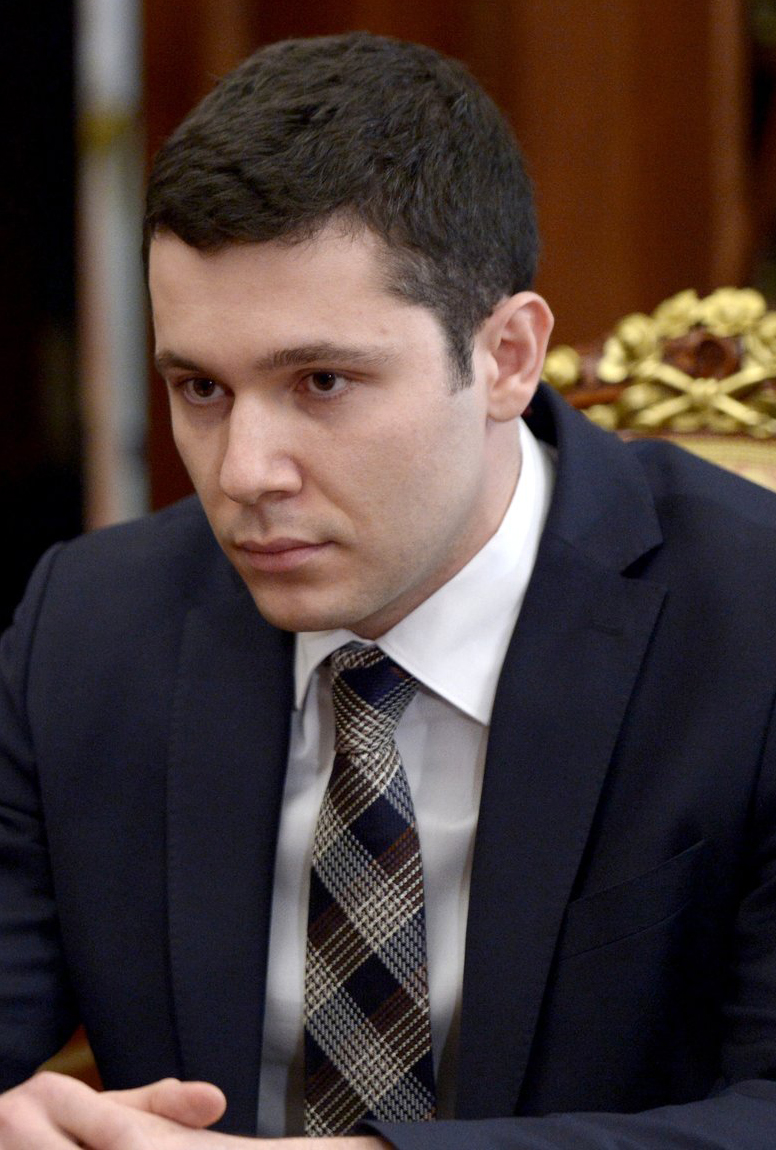

		LDPR	CPRF
Nominee	Anton Alikhanov	Yevgeny Mishin	Maksim Bulanov
Party	United Russia	LDPR	CPRF
Popular vote	259,220	20,683	15,783
Percentage	80.21%	6.40%	4.88%
		RPPSS	CR
Nominee	Yuri Shitikov	Vladimir Vukolov	Vladimir Sultanov
Party	SRZP	RPPSS	CPCR
Popular vote	12,089	4,722	4,256
Percentage	3.74%	1.46%	1.32%
Governor before election
Anton Alikhanov
United Russia
Elected Governor
Anton Alikhanov
United Russia

The 2022 Kaliningrad Oblast gubernatorial election took place on 9–11 September 2022, on common election day. Incumbent Governor Anton Alikhanov was elected to a second full term.

== Background ==
Anton Alikhanov was appointed acting Governor of Kaliningrad Oblast in October 2016 after Yevgeny Zinichev resigned form the post due to family reasons. Alikhanov won the election with 81.06% of the vote.

Due to the start of the Russian invasion of Ukraine in February 2022 and subsequent economic sanctions the cancellation and postponement of direct gubernatorial elections was proposed. The measure was even supported by A Just Russia leader Sergey Mironov. Position of Kaliningrad Oblast is also unique, as it is the only Russian region-exclave, so some proposed to uphold the election for national security reasons. However, Governor Alikhanov supported direct gubernatorial election. During a video call President Vladimir Putin criticised Alikhanov for using military operation as an excuse for oblast's construction declined, however, Putin endorsed Alikhanov for a second term. Eventually, on 9 June Kaliningrad Oblast Duma called gubernatorial election for 11 September 2022.

== Candidates ==
Only political parties can nominate candidates for gubernatorial election in Kaliningrad Oblast, self-nomination is not possible. However, candidates are not obliged to be members of the nominating party. Candidate for Governor of Kaliningrad Oblast should be a Russian citizen and at least 30 years old. Each candidate in order to be registered is required to collect at least 8% of signatures of members and heads of municipalities (37-39 signatures). Also gubernatorial candidates present 3 candidacies to the Federation Council and election winner later appoints one of the presented candidates.

=== Registered ===
- Anton Alikhanov (United Russia), incumbent Governor of Kaliningrad Oblast
- Maksim Bulanov (CPRF), Member of Legislative Assembly of Kaliningrad Oblast
- Yevgeny Mishin (LDPR), Member of Legislative Assembly of Kaliningrad Oblast, 2015 and 2017 gubernatorial candidate
- Yury Shitikov (SR-ZP), Member of Legislative Assembly of Kaliningrad Oblast, attorney
- Vladimir Sultanov (Communists of Russia), former Member of Kaliningrad Oblast Duma (2007-2016), 2017 CPSS gubernatorial candidate
- Vladimir Vukolov (RPPSS), former Deputy Chairman of Kaliningrad Oblast Duma (2006-2011), 2015 gubernatorial candidate

=== Eliminated in primary ===
- Larisa Shvalkene (United Russia), First Deputy Chair of Legislative Assembly of Kaliningrad Oblast

=== Candidates for Federation Council ===
- Anton Alikhanov (United Russia):
  - Aleksandr Shenderyuk-Zhidkov, former Deputy Chairman of the Government of Kaliningrad Oblast (2017-2018)
  - Oleg Tkach, incumbent Senator
  - Oleg Urbanyuk, Member of Legislative Assembly of Kaliningrad Oblast, chairman of DOSAAF regional office
- Maksim Bulanov (CPRF):
  - Rustam Kasumov, businessman
  - Yevgeny Kravchenko, Member of Legislative Assembly of Kaliningrad Oblast, businessman
  - Artyom Vertepov, Member of Legislative Assembly of Kaliningrad Oblast, businessman
- Yevgeny Mishin (LDPR):
  - Sergey Kondratyev, salesman
  - Semyon Kurbatov, Member of Guryevsk Council of Deputies, aide to State Duma member Yaroslav Nilov
  - Andrey Lyzhov, Member of Legislative Assembly of Kaliningrad Oblast
- Yury Shitikov (SR-ZP):
  - Leonid Kobyak, individual entrepreneur
  - Vladimir Skrypnik, aide to Yury Shitikov, associate professor of logistics at Kaliningrad State Technical University
  - Georgy Tsukan, Member of Guryevsk Council of Deputies, businessman
- Vladimir Sultanov (Communists of Russia):
  - Oleg Antonov, businessman
  - Vladimir Timofeyev, individual entrepreneur
  - Anna Zueya, individual entrepreneur
- Vladimir Vukolov (RPPSS):
  - Viktor Akulov, pensioner
  - Dmitry Ivchenko, pensioner
  - Yury Lyapin, dentist

== Finances ==
All sums are in rubles.

Financial Report	Source	Alikhanov	Bulanov	Mishin	Shitikov	Sultanov	Vukolov
First		10,000,000	50,000	500,000	100,000	5,800	5,800
Final		12,000,000	2,133,077	3,600,000	3,500,000	7,300	19,700

== Results ==
Summary of the 9–11 September 2022 Kaliningrad Oblast gubernatorial election results
Candidate	Party	Votes	%
Anton Alikhanov (incumbent)	United Russia	259,220	80.21
Yevgeny Mishin	Liberal Democratic Party	20,683	6.40
Maksim Bulanov	Communist Party	15,783	4.88
Yury Shitikov	A Just Russia — For Truth	12,089	3.74
Vladimir Vukolov	Party of Pensioners	4,722	1.46
Vladimir Sultanov	Communists of Russia	4,256	1.32
Valid votes		316,753	98.01
Blank ballots		6,410	1.98
Total		323,172	100.00
Turnout		323,172	38.49
Registered voters		839,700	100.00

Former Deputy Chairman of the Government of Kaliningrad Oblast Aleksandr Shenderyuk-Zhidkov (United Russia) was appointed to the Federation Council, replacing incumbent Senator Oleg Tkach (United Russia).

== See also ==
- 2022 Russian gubernatorial elections
