= Governor of Kaliningrad Oblast =

Highest-ranking official in Kaliningrad Oblast, Russia

- Standard of the Governor

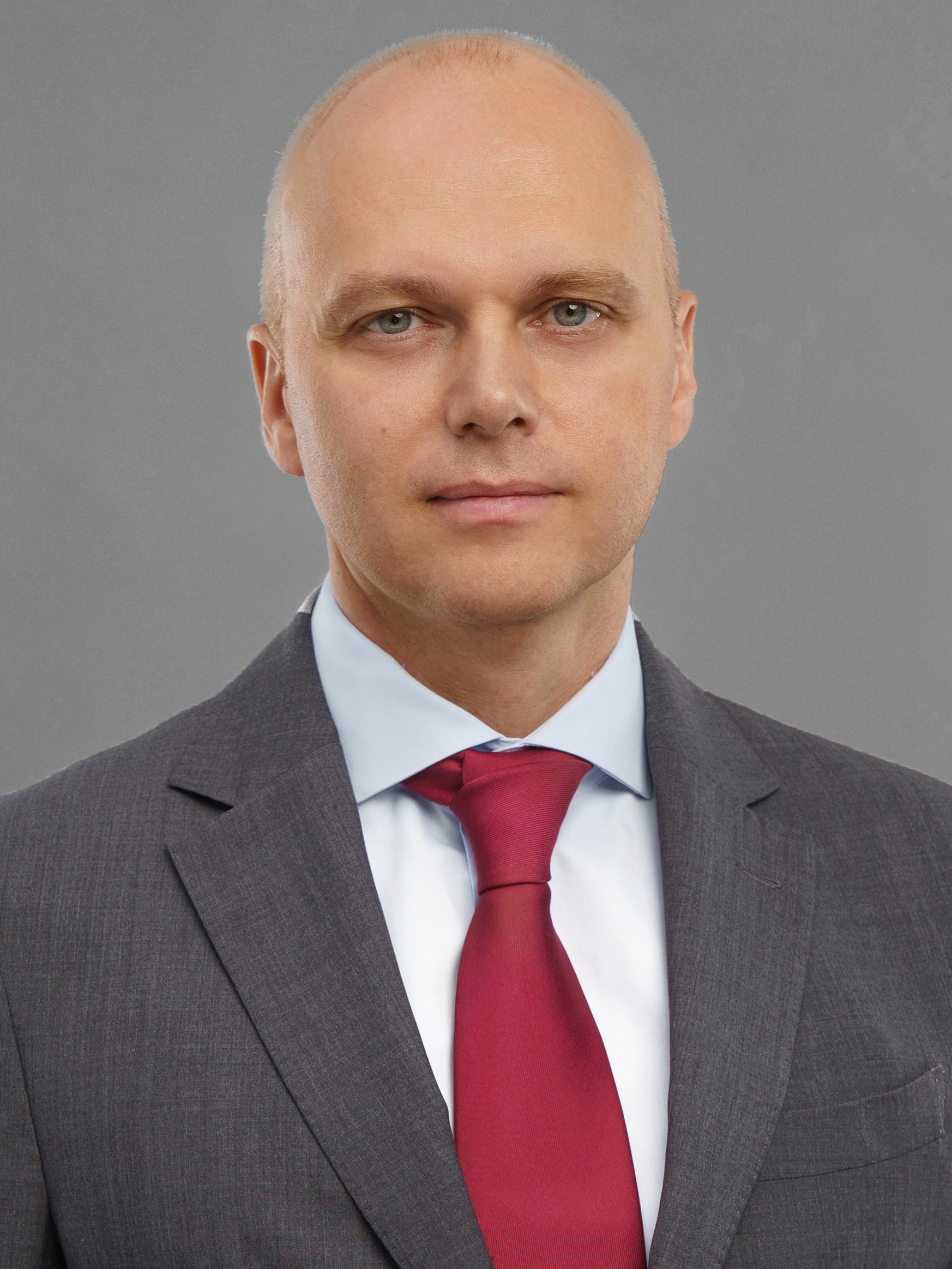
- Incumbent; Alexey Besprozvannykh since 20 September 2024
- Residence: Kaliningrad
- Term length: Four years, renewable once
- Inaugural holder: Yuri Matochkin; 1991
- Formation: 1946 as Chairman of Executive Committee of Kaliningrad Oblast
- Website: Government of Kaliningrad Oblast

The Governor of Kaliningrad Oblast (Губернатор Калининградской области) is the head of executive branch for the Kaliningrad Oblast (former Königsberg, East Prussia), considered as Prime Minister of Kaliningrad Oblast.

The office of Governor is an elected position, for which elected officials serve four year terms. While individual politicians may serve as many terms as they can be elected to, Governors cannot be elected to more than two consecutive terms.

The official residence for the Governor is located in Kaliningrad. The current acting Governor is Alexey Besprozvannykh who assumed office 15 May 2024.

== Chairmen of the Kaliningrad Oblast Executive Committee (1947–91) ==
Since the creation of Kaliningrad Oblast in 1946 and until the spring of 1990, the Kaliningrad Regional Committee of the Communist Party had the leading role in its government. The committee was led by:

1. Vasily Borisov (May 1947 – April 1948)
2. Alexey Yegorov (April 1948 – December 1951)
3. Zakhar Slaykovsky (December 1951 – May 1962)
4. Yakov Prushinsky (May 1962 – March 1966)
5. Vladimir Vitkovsky (May 1966 – May 1983)
6. Vasily Loginov (June 1983 – April 1987)
7. Yuri Malinkin (April 1987 – September 1991)

== List of governors ==
No.	Portrait	Name	Tenure	Time in office	Party	Election
1		Yuri Matochkin (1931–2006)	25 September 1991 – 20 October 1996 (lost election)	5 years, 25 days	Independent	Appointed
2		Leonid Gorbenko (1939–2010)	20 October 1996 – 8 December 2000 (lost re-election)	4 years, 49 days	Our Home – Russia	1996
3		Vladimir Yegorov (1938–2022)	8 December 2000 – 28 September 2005 (resigned)	4 years, 294 days	United Russia	2000
4		Georgy Boos (born 1963)	28 September 2005 – 27 September 2010 (term end)	4 years, 364 days	United Russia	2005
5		Nikolay Tsukanov (born 1965)	28 September 2010 – 28 July 2016 (resigned)	5 years, 304 days	United Russia	2010; 2015
—		Yevgeny Zinichev (1966–2021)	28 July 2016 – 6 October 2016 (resigned)	70 days	Independent	Acting
—		Anton Alikhanov (born 1986)	6 October 2016 – 9 September 2017	7 years, 221 days	United Russia	Acting
6		Anton Alikhanov (born 1986)	29 September 2017 – 14 May 2024 (resigned)	7 years, 221 days	United Russia	2017; 2022
—		Sergei Yeliseyev (born 1971)	14 May 2024 – 15 May 2024	1 day	Independent	Acting
—		Alexey Besprozvannykh (born 1979)	15 May 2024 – 20 September 2024	2 years, 115 days	United Russia	Acting
7		Alexey Besprozvannykh (born 1979)	20 September 2024 – present	2 years, 115 days	United Russia	2024

== Elections ==
The latest election for the office was held September 11 2022.

Summary of the 9–11 September 2022 Kaliningrad Oblast gubernatorial election results
Candidate	Party	Votes	%
Anton Alikhanov (incumbent)	United Russia	259,220	80.21
Yevgeny Mishin	Liberal Democratic Party	20,683	6.40
Maksim Bulanov	Communist Party	15,783	4.88
Yury Shitikov	A Just Russia — For Truth	12,089	3.74
Vladimir Vukolov	Party of Pensioners	4,722	1.46
Vladimir Sultanov	Communists of Russia	4,256	1.32
Valid votes		316,753	98.01
Blank ballots		6,410	1.98
Total		323,172	100.00
Turnout		323,172	38.49
Registered voters		839,700	100.00

The previous election for the office was held on 10 September 2017

Candidate	Party	Votes	%
Anton Alikhanov	United Russia	255,491	81.06%
Igor Revin	Communist Party	28,007	8.89%
Yevgeny Mishin	Liberal Democratic Party	17,256	5.47%
Yekaterina Timofeeva	Greens	7,966	2.53%
Valid ballots		308,720	97.95%
Invalid ballots		6,467	2.05%
Turnout		315,187	39.35%
