= 2017 Kaliningrad Oblast gubernatorial election =

Election

- 10 September 2017
- Turnout: 39,35%
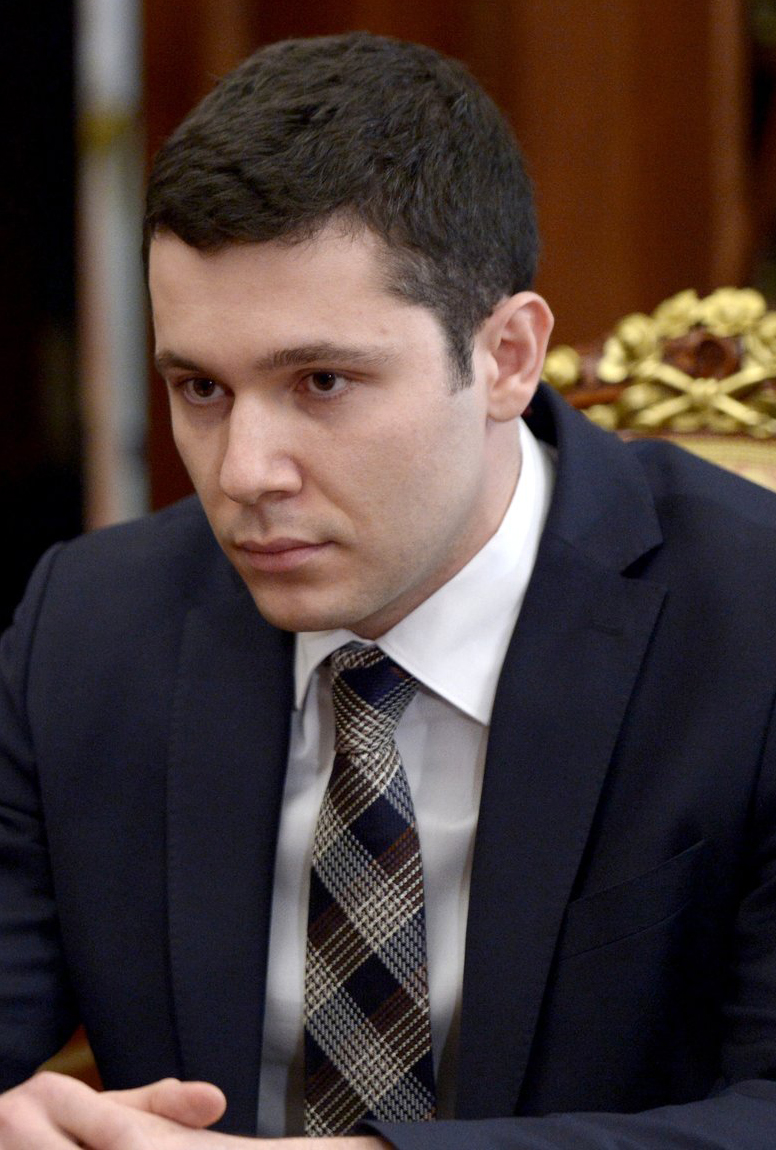

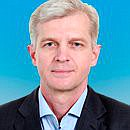
| Nominee | Anton Alikhanov | Igor Revin |
| Party | United Russia | CPRF |
| Popular vote | 255,491 | 28,007 |
| Percentage | 81.06% | 8.89% |
| | LDPR | Green |
| Nominee | Yevgeny Mishin | Yekaterina Timofeeva |
| Party | LDPR | The Greens |
| Popular vote | 17,256 | 7,966 |
| Percentage | 5.47% | 2.53% |
- 2017 Kaliningrad Oblast gubernatorial election results by municipality
Acting Governor before election
Anton Alikhanov
Independent
Elected Governor
Anton Alikhanov
Independent

A gubernatorial election in Kaliningrad Oblast was held on 10 September 2017.

== Background ==
28 July 2016 the Governor Nikolay Tsukanov resigned. The acting Governor was Yevgeny Zinichev. 6 October 2016 Yevgeny Zinichev resigned from the post of the acting Governor, in connection with family circumstances, the new acting Governor was appointed Anton Alikhanov.

== Key dates ==
- 8 Jun 2017 — Kaliningrad Oblast Duma has appointed elections to 10 September 2017.
- from 11 to 21 July — submission of documents for registration of candidates.
- from 12 August to 8 September — the period of campaigning in the mass media.
- 9 September 2017 — day of Election silence.
- 10 September 2017 — election day.
- 24 September 2017 — possible second round of election.

== Candidates ==
Candidates on the ballot:

| Candidate | Party | Office |
|---|---|---|
| Anton Alikhanov; Born 1986 (age 30) | Independent (nominated by United Russia) | Incumbent acting Governor |
| Yevgeny Mishin; Born 1984 (age 33) | Liberal Democratic Party | Member of Kaliningrad Oblast Duma |
| Igor Revin; Born 1955 (age 58) | Communist Party | Member of Kaliningrad Oblast Duma |
| Yekaterina Timofeeva; Born 1982 (age 35) | Greens | Environmental activist |

== Opinion polls ==
| Date | Poll source | Anton Alikhanov | Igor Revin | Yevgeny Mishin | Yekaterina Timofeeva | Other | Undecided | Abstention | Spoil the Ballot |
|---|---|---|---|---|---|---|---|---|---|
| 10-20 August | WCIOM | 66% | 3% | 2% | 1% | 1% | 18% | 8% | 1% |

== Result ==
| Candidate | Party | Votes | % |
|---|---|---|---|
| Anton Alikhanov | United Russia | 255,491 | 81.06% |
| Igor Revin | Communist Party | 28,007 | 8.89% |
| Yevgeny Mishin | Liberal Democratic Party | 17,256 | 5.47% |
| Yekaterina Timofeeva | Greens | 7,966 | 2.53% |
| Valid ballots | | 308,720 | 97.95% |
| Invalid ballots | | 6,467 | 2.05% |
| Total | | 315,187 | 100% |
| Turnout | | 315,187 | 39.35% |

== See also ==
- 2017 Russian gubernatorial elections
