= Igor Kholmanskikh =

- Игорь Холманских
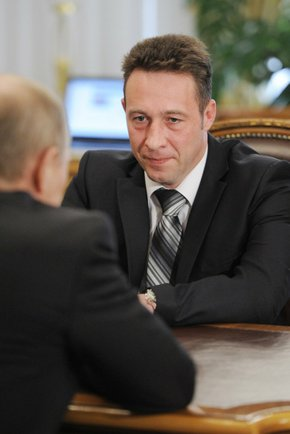
- Kholmanskikh in 2012

Russian Presidential Envoy to the Ural Federal District
- In office 18 May 2012 – 26 June 2018
- President: Vladimir Putin
- Preceded by: Yevgeny Kuyvashev
- Succeeded by: Nikolay Tsukanov

Personal details
- Born: 29 June 1969 (age 57) Nizhny Tagil, Sverdlovsk Oblast, Russian SFSR, Soviet Union

Igor Ryurikovich Kholmanskikh (Russian: Игорь Рюрикович Холманских; born 29 June 1969) is a former Russian government appointee and former factory worker. He served as the presidential envoy to Ural Federal District, and a member of the Security Council of Russia, from 2012 to 2018.

He has the federal state civilian service rank of 1st class Active State Councillor of the Russian Federation.

== Early life ==
Igor Kholmanskikh was born in 1969. His parents worked for Uralvagonzavod, a factory in Nizhny Tagil, Sverdlovsk Oblast, Russia. Kholmanskikh graduated with a degree in mechanics from the Nizhny Tagil branch of the Ural State Technical University in 1994.

== Career ==
Kholmanskikh worked a foreman for Uralvagonzavod, where he became the chief assembly manager in August 2011.

During the 2012 Russian presidential election, Kholmanskikh expressed support for candidate Vladimir Putin on national television. Once Putin was elected as president, he appointed Kholmanskikh as the presidential envoy to Ural Federal District "without any prior government or political experience." He also serves on the Security Council of Russia.

In her 2017 book, Democracy: Stories from the Long Road to Freedom, former US Secretary of State Condoleezza Rice writes that Kholmanskikh's appointment "bears a strong resemblance to the folklore of an era long past. Heroic laborers who through hard work and grit industrialized the country and farmed the land have long been admired, whether in Russia or the Soviet Union."

On 26 June 2018, Kholmanskikh was replaced by Nikolay Tsukanov. On 9 July 2018 he became head of the board of directors of Uralvagonzavod.
