= Simsky (rural locality) =

Simsky Симский
- Village
- Location within Bashkortostan Location within Russia
- Coordinates: 54°29′N 56°26′E
- Country: Russia
- Region: Bashkortostan
- District: Karmaskalinsky District
- Time zone: UTC+5:00

Simsky (Russian: Симский; Bashkir: Эҫем, Eśem) is a rural locality (a village) in Sakhayevsky Selsoviet, Karmaskalinsky District, Bashkortostan, Russia. The population was 42 as of 2010. There are three streets.

== Geography ==
Simsky is located 31 km northeast of Karmaskaly (the district's administrative centre) by road. Kuyashkino is the nearest rural locality.
