= 2017 Russian gubernatorial elections =

← 2016	10 September 2017	2018 →

17 Heads of Federal Subjects from 85
	First party	Second party
Party	United Russia	Independent
Last election	6	3
Seats before	72	10
Seats after	79	3
Seat change	+7	-7
Vote in Parliaments	48	0
Percentage	100%	0%
	Third party	Fourth party
Party	CPRF	LDPR
Last election	0	0
Seats before	2	1
Seats after	2	1
Seat change	0	0

Gubernatorial elections were held on 10 September 2017 in 17 federal subjects of Russia.

Sixteen federal subjects had direct elections of governors. In Adygea, the governor was elected by the region's parliament. All seventeen of the new governors were nominated by ruling party United Russia.

== Results ==
=== Direct election ===
Federal Subject	Incumbent	Party	Incumbent status	Governor-elect
Adygea	Murat Kumpilov	United Russia	Acting	Murat Kumpilov
Belgorod Oblast	Yevgeny Savchenko	United Russia	Term-limited	Yevgeny Savchenko
Buryatia	Alexey Tsydenov	United Russia	Acting	Alexey Tsydenov
Kaliningrad Oblast	Anton Alikhanov	United Russia	Acting	Anton Alikhanov
Karelia	Artur Parfenchikov	United Russia	Acting	Artur Parfenchikov
Kirov Oblast	Igor Vasilyev	United Russia	Acting	Igor Vasilyev
Mari El	Alexander Yevstifeyev	United Russia	Acting	Alexander Yevstifeyev
Mordovia	Vladimir Volkov	United Russia	Term-limited	Vladimir Volkov
Novgorod Oblast	Andrey Nikitin	United Russia	Acting	Andrey Nikitin
Perm Krai	Maxim Reshetnikov	United Russia	Acting	Maxim Reshetnikov
Ryazan Oblast	Nikolay Lyubimov	United Russia	Acting	Nikolav Lyubimov
Saratov Oblast	Valery Radayev	United Russia	Term-limited	Valery Radayev
Sevastopol^{1}	Dmitry Ovsyannikov	United Russia	Acting	Dmitry Ovsyannikov
Sverdlovsk Oblast	Yevgeny Kuyvashev	United Russia	Term-limited	Yevgeny Kuyvashev
Tomsk Oblast	Sergey Zhvachkin	United Russia	Term-limited	Sergey Zhvachkin
Udmurtia	Alexander Brechalov	United Russia	Acting	Alexander Brechalov
Yaroslavl Oblast	Dmitry Mironov	United Russia	Acting	Dmitry Mironov

^{1} Internationally recognised as part of Ukraine, see political status of Crimea and annexation of Crimea by the Russian Federation for details

=== Vote in Parliament ===
The number of votes in Adygea:

Party	Votes	%	Seats
United Russia	48	100.00	1
A Just Russia	0	0.00	0
Independents	0	0.00	0
Total	48	100.00	1
Registered voters/turnout	48	–	

== See also ==
- 2017 Russian regional elections
