= Alexander Shenderyuk–Zhidkov =

Russian politician (born 1982)

Alexander Shenderyuk-Zhidkov
- Александр Шендерюк-Жидков
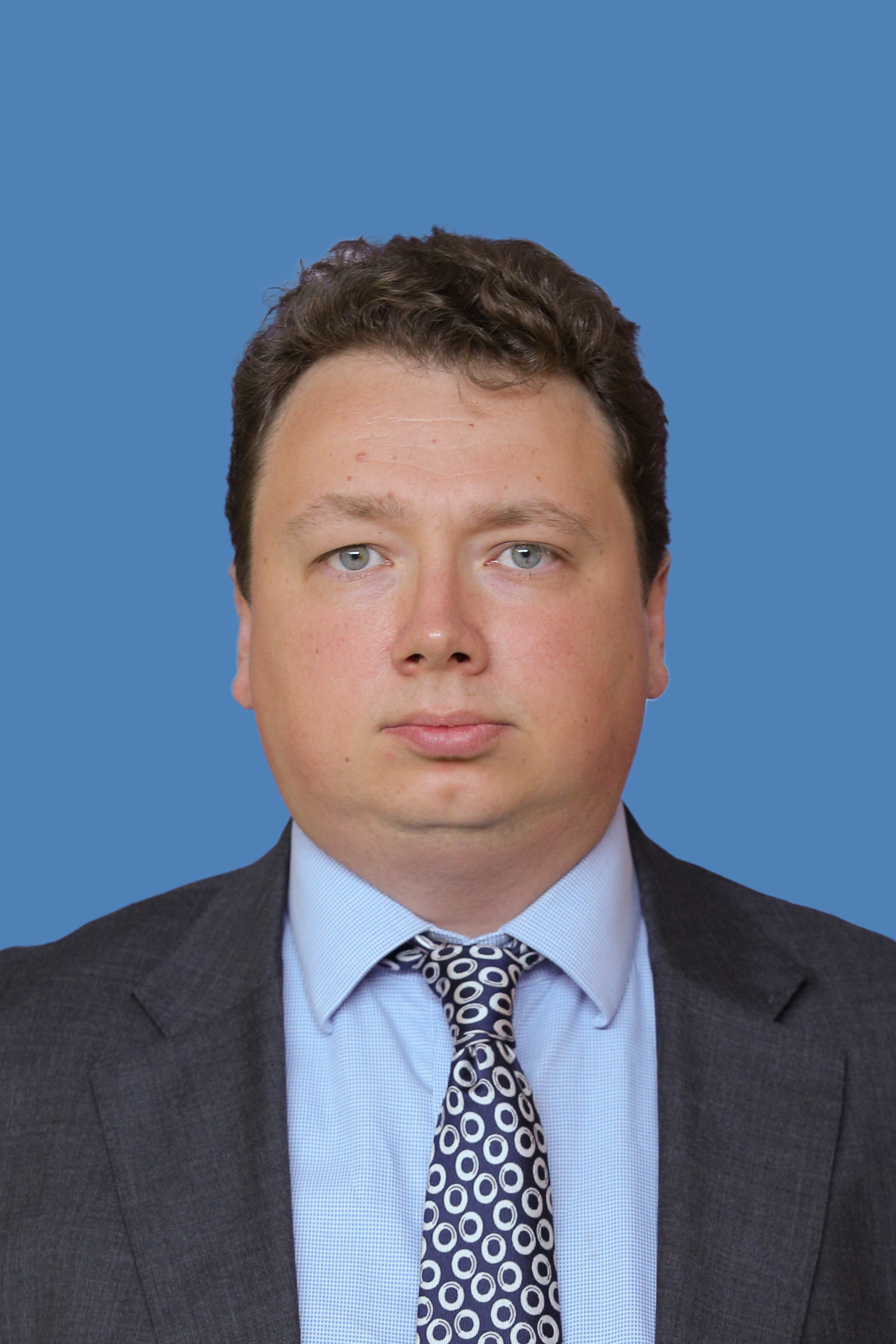

Senator from Kaliningrad Oblast
- Incumbent
- Assumed office 16 September 2022
- Preceded by: Oleg Tkach

Personal details
- Born: Alexander Shenderyuk-Zhidkov; 25 November 1982 (age 43) Kaliningrad, Russian Soviet Federative Socialist Republic, Soviet Union
- Education: Immanuel Kant Baltic Federal University

Alexander Vladimirovich Shenderyuk-Zhidkov (Russian: Александр Владимирович Шендерюк-Жидков; born 25 November 1982) is a Russian politician serving as a senator from Kaliningrad Oblast since 16 September 2022, First Deputy Chairman of Budget and Financial markets Committee of Russian Council.

== Career ==
Alexander Shenderyuk–Zhidkov was born on 25 November 1982 in Kaliningrad, Russian Soviet Federative Socialist Republic in the family of Russian scientist. His grandfather - Gennady Zhidkov was famous historian, founder of Kaliningrad State University history faculty. His second grandfather - Vladimir Shenderyuk was famous Soviet and Russian food technologist, specializing in the salting, smoking, and enzymatic processing of fish and marine products.

In 2004, he graduated from the Immanuel Kant Baltic Federal University. In 2004, he graduated Aarhus University School of Business.

From 2006 to 2016, he worked in the company "Sodrugestvo", which manages agro-industrial assets.

In 2016, Shenderyuk-Zhidkov was appointed Deputy Prime Minister of the Kaliningrad Oblast. He became developer of Special Administrative Areas in Kaliningrad Region and Primorsky Krai.

From 2018 to 2022 was Russian CEO of Sodrugestvo Group with annual turnover up to US$4 billion.

Member of the Board of Immanuel Kant Baltic Federal University. In September 2022 was honored Doctor Honoris Causa degree of IKBFU. Research Scientist at the Baltic Center for Neurotechnology and Artificial Intelligence.

On 16 September 2022, he was appointed a senator from Kaliningrad Oblast.

In December 2023 became Deputy Chairman of Budget and Financial markets Russian Council Committee.

On 20 September 2024 was appointed again a senator from Kaliningrad oblast.

In December 2024 became First Deputy Chairman of Budget and Financial markets Russian Council Committee.

== Legislative activity ==
Shenderyuk-Zhidkov has served as a senator from Kaliningrad Oblast since September 2022 and First Deputy Chair of the Federation Council Committee on the Budget and Financial Markets since December 2024, focusing on budget execution, tax policy, and financial regulations. Key initiatives include 2023 amendments to Special Administrative Regions (SARs) for capital repatriation and support for sanctioned asset holders; 2024 laws against financial pyramids and fraud, plus powers to block suspected saboteurs' funds; extending cryptocurrency use in SARs to counter sanctions; and a 3% tax on foreign IT giants (global income >$20B) as a Pillar 1 analog.

He advocates digital reforms like AI regulation and IT tax incentives (e.g., 7% income tax). Foreign media view these as sanction-evasion tools, critiquing opacity and state control.

== Political activity and views ==
Shenderyuk-Zhidkov was Deputy Prime Minister of Kaliningrad Oblast (2016–2018), focusing on economic development. As a senator, he criticizes European policies, such as Germany's AfD "persecution".

He praised JD Vance as a conservative "neutral candidate" for Russia, positive for bilateral relations. In 2024, he supported the Ilyin/Dugin philosophical school, praising Dugin as a "great thinker" at Daria Dugina's monument unveiling in 2025.

In September 2025, he backed London protests led by Tommy Robinson for potential Russia-UK dialogue. He also expressed condolences for U.S. conservative activist Charlie Kirk's assassination, calling it a "big loss" for conservatism and praising Kirk's advocacy of traditional values. On September 7, 2025, he participated in the Moscow cross procession led by Patriarch Kirill, highlighting its Orthodox significance.

Shenderyuk-Zhidkov initiated monuments in Kaliningrad: to Fyodor Dostoevsky (2021, symbolizing Russian heritage) and Mikhail Muravyov (2023, opposite Lithuanian consulate, sparking international backlash from Lithuania over historical tensions).

He has condemned Ukrainian strikes and aligns with pro-government positions, emphasizing national sovereignty and criticism of Western authoritarianism.

== Sanctions ==
Alexander Shenderyuk–Zhidkov is under personal sanctions introduced by the European Union, Switzerland and Ukraine, for ratifying the decisions of the "Treaty of Friendship, Cooperation and Mutual Assistance between the Russian Federation and the Donetsk People's Republic and between the Russian Federation and the Luhansk People's Republic" and providing political and economic support for Russia's annexation of Ukrainian territories.
