= Leonid Gorbenko =

Russian politician (1939–2010)

- Леонид Горбенко
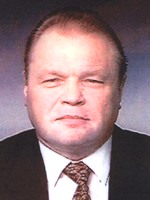

2nd Governor of Kaliningrad Oblast
- In office 20 October 1996 – 8 December 2000
- Preceded by: Yuri Matochkin
- Succeeded by: Vladimir Yegorov

Personal details
- Born: Leonid Petrovich Gorbenko; 20 June 1939 Shenderivka, Ukraine, Soviet Union
- Died: 7 August 2010 (aged 71) Ushakovo, Russia
- Spouse: Raisa Yakovlevna

Leonid Petrovich Gorbenko (Russian: Леонид Петрович Горбенко; 20 June 1939 – 7 August 2010) was a Russian politician. He was elected the 2nd Governor of Kaliningrad Oblast in 1996, serving in that office until 2000.

Kalinigrad's first governor, Yuri Matochkin, was appointed by Russian president Boris Yeltsin. Matochkin pursued largely pro-Western policies and tried to boost ties to Kalinigrad's neighboring countries in the Baltic. Leonid Gorbenko defeated Matochkin in the 1996 gubernatorial election.

In 1998, Gorbenko declared a state of emergency in Kalinigrad following the 1998 Russian financial crisis. The state of emergency was illegal under Russian law, but allowed Gorbenko to consolidate his hold on power. Gorbenko, unlike his predecessor, pursued an isolationist policy toward Kalinigrad's neighbors and the rest of Russia. His administration had a reputation for corruption and mismanagement, with connections to many of Kalinigrad's businesses.

City and local officials in Kaliningrad Oblast were largely dissatisfied with Gorbenko's isolationalist policies. Many municipalities created their own development plans to attract Russian and foreign investors and business.

Vladimir Putin became Russia's second president in May 2000. Putin, who was dissatisfied with Leonid Gorbenko's policies, openly supported Gorbenko's opponent in the 2000 Kalinigrad gubernatorial election, Admiral Vladimir Yegorov, the former commander of Russia's Baltic Fleet,. In November 2000, Yegorov defeated Gorbenko in the election.

Leonid Gorbenko died on 7 August 2010, at the age of 71.
