= Vladimir Yegorov (politician, born 1938) =

Russian admiral (1938–2022)

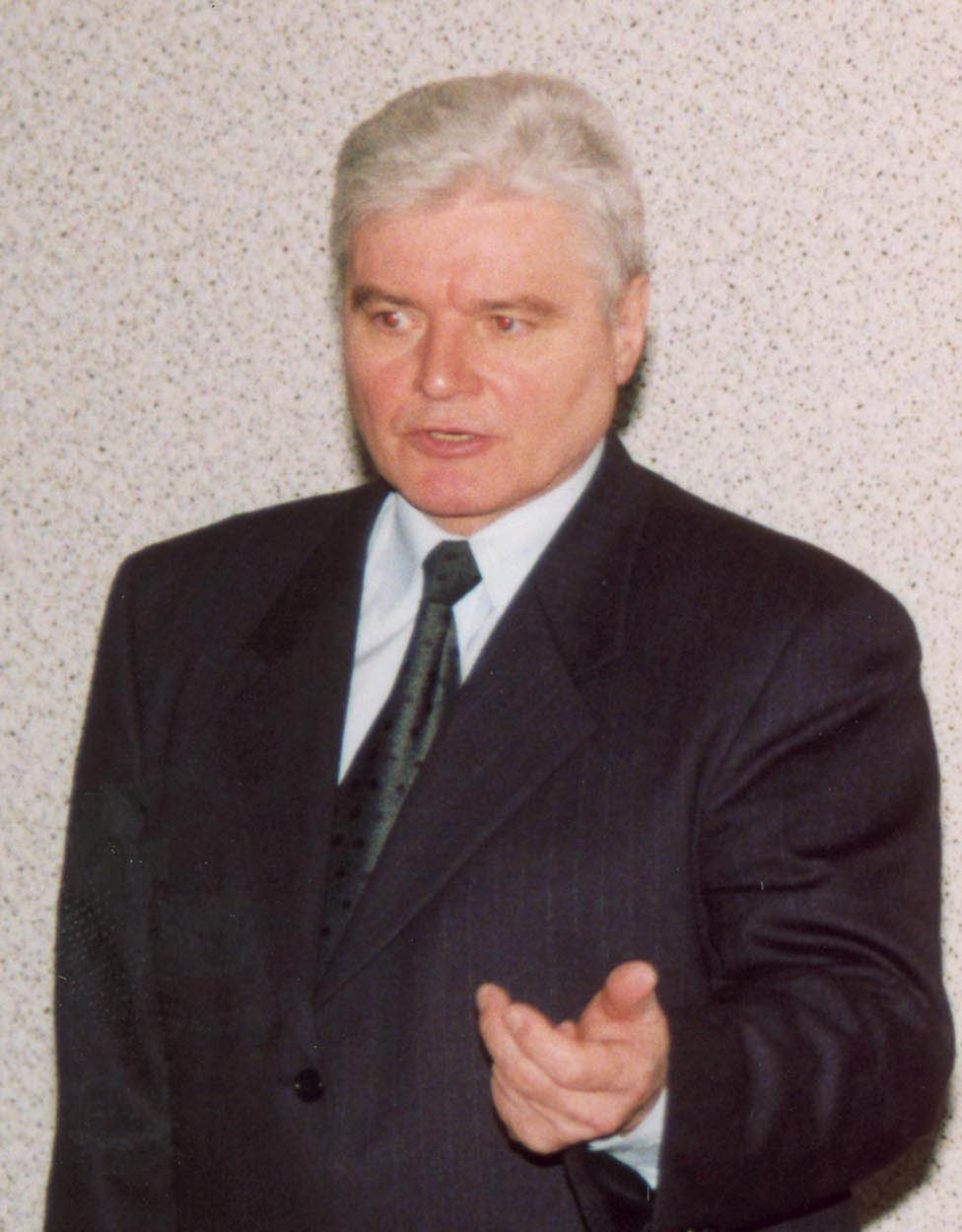
- Yegorov in 2002
- Native name: Владимир Григорьевич Егоров
- Born: 26 November 1938; Moscow, Russian SFSR, USSR
- Died: 8 June 2022 (aged 83) Kaliningrad, Russia
- Allegiance: Soviet Union; Russia
- Branch: Soviet Navy, Russian Navy
- Service years: 1961–1992
- Rank: Admiral
- Commands: Baltic Fleet, 5th Operational Squadron
- Awards: Order of Merit for the Fatherland; Order of Military Merit; Order for Service to the Homeland in the Armed Forces of the USSR, 3rd and 2nd class.

3rd Governor of Kaliningrad Oblast
- In office 8 December 2000 – 28 September 2005
- Preceded by: Leonid Gorbenko
- Succeeded by: Georgy Boos

Vladimir Grigoryevich Yegorov (Russian: Владимир Григорьевич Егоров; 26 November 1938 – 8 June 2022) was the governor of Kaliningrad Oblast of Russia from 2001 to 2005. He was Admiral commanding the Baltic Fleet before he became governor. He was born in Moscow in 1938.

== Naval service ==
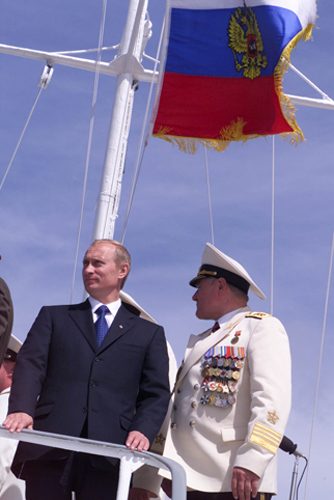
Yegorov with Putin in July 2000

Yegorov was born in Moscow in 1938, after completing high school he worked as a lathe operator in a factory in Leningrad before entering the M.V. Frunze Higher Naval School. Yegorov graduated with the gold medal in 1962 and joined the Northern Fleet. In 1964 he transferred to the Baltic Fleet and was torpedo officer on a destroyer. He completed the Higher Special Officer Classes of the Navy in 1971 and commanded the Krivak-class frigate Bditelnyy and the Kashin-class destroyer Obraztsovyy. Between 1974 and 1984 Yegorov commanded squadrons of destroyers and a flotilla of missile boats of the Baltic Fleet. In 1984 he completed the General Staff Academy and was subsequently base commander of the Baltiysk Naval Base and then commander of the Soviet Mediterranean squadron. Yegorov was promoted to Admiral and commanded the Baltic Fleet from 1991.

== Politics ==
Yegorov was elected Governor of the Kaliningrad Oblast in November 2000, defeating incumbent governor Leonid Gorbenko in the gubernatorial election. Yegorov's candidacy was supported by Russian president Vladimir Putin. He retired from office in 2005.

Yegorov was seriously injured in a car accident on 7 May 2009.

Yegorov was an honorary citizen of Kaliningrad and an honorary member of the Swedish Royal Marine Society. He was also an honorary member of the Saint Petersburg Maritime Council and the Society of Military Attaches.

== Honours and awards ==
- Order of Merit for the Fatherland, 3rd class
- Order of Military Merit
- Order for Service to the Homeland in the Armed Forces of the USSR, 2nd class and 3rd class
- Jubilee Medal "300 Years of the Russian Navy"
- Jubilee Medal "In Commemoration of the 100th Anniversary since the Birth of Vladimir Il'ich Lenin"
- Jubilee Medal "Twenty Years of Victory in the Great Patriotic War 1941-1945"
- Jubilee Medal "50 Years of the Armed Forces of the USSR"
- Jubilee Medal "60 Years of the Armed Forces of the USSR"
- Jubilee Medal "70 Years of the Armed Forces of the USSR"
- Medal "For Impeccable Service", 1st, 2nd and 3rd class
