= Ministry of Industry and Trade (Russia) =

Government minister of Russia

Ministry of Industry and Trade of the Russian Federation
- Министерство промышленности и торговли Российской Федерации; Ministersrvo promyshlennosti i torgovli Rossiiskoi Federatsii

Agency overview
- Formed: May 12, 2008
- Preceding agency: Ministry of Industry and Energy of the Russian Federation
- Jurisdiction: Russian Federation
- Headquarters: IQ-quarter, Moscow
- Minister responsible: Anton Alikhanov
- Child agency: Federal Agency on Technical Regulating and Metrology
- Website: minpromtorg.gov.ru

The Ministry of Industry and Trade of the Russian Federation (Minpromtorg, MITRF, Russian: Министерство промышленности и торговли Российской Федерации) is an executive ministry of Government of Russia. Its headquarters are in Moscow.

== Functions and responsibilities ==
The ministry regulates foreign trade, defense and civil industries, metrology, technical standardization, and aviation technology development. It is a federal executive body.

MITRF is responsible for subsidizing subcontractors to acquire products for government via investment contracts (special investments contracts) and may also forcibly regulate prices (e.g. for steel industry).

MITRF is responsible for contracts involving R&D activities at the expense of government budget. As of 2013 the results of research may be transferred to a subcontractor ownership upon fulfilling (completion) of a contract.

== History ==
MITRF is a successor to the Soviet Union State Planning Committee (Gosplan).

== See also ==
- Ministry of Trade and Industry
- Government of Russia
- Ministry of Energy (Russia)
