= Alexey Besprozvannykh =

Russian politician (born 1979)

- Алексей Беспрозванных
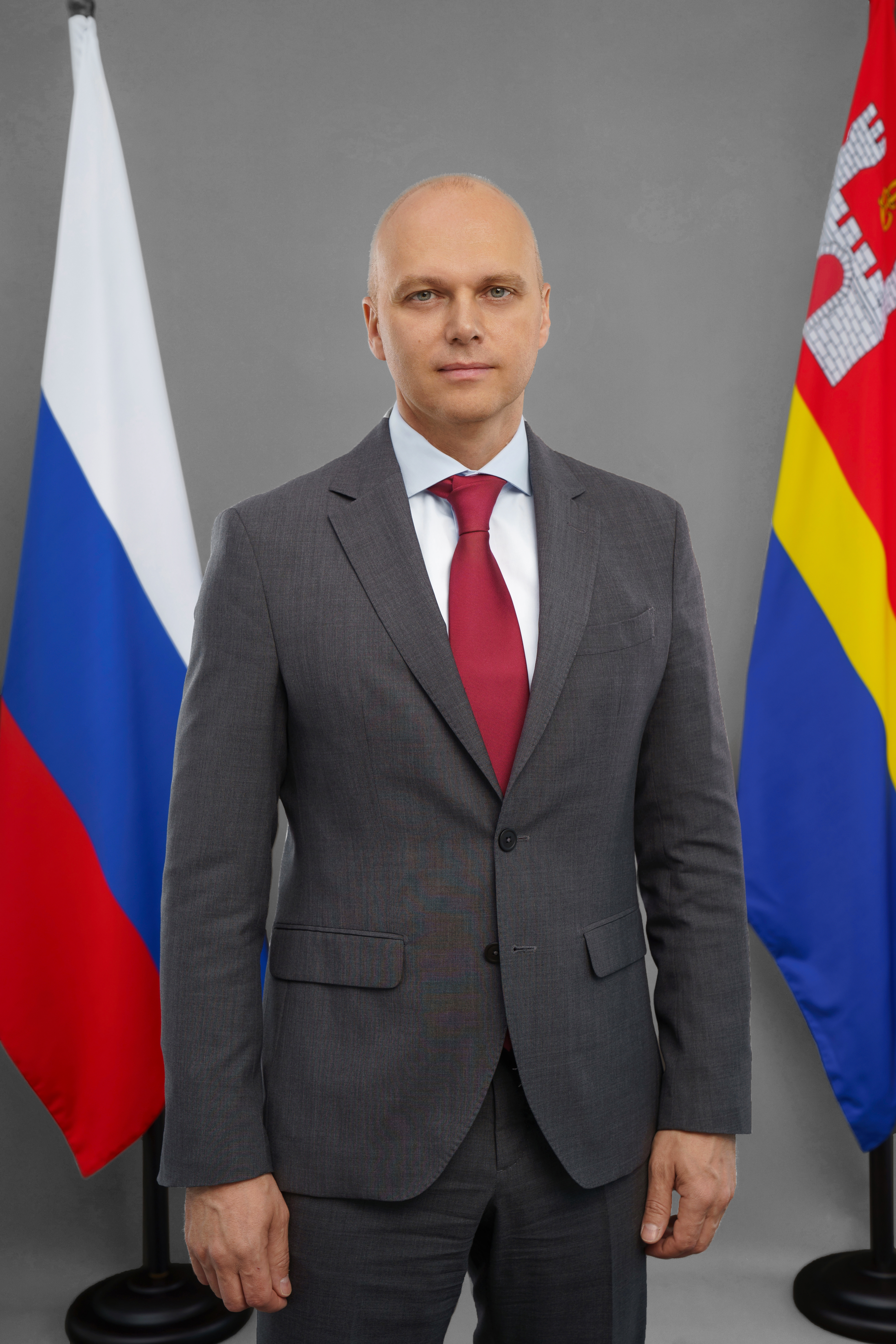
- Official portrait, 2024

Governor of Kaliningrad Oblast
- Incumbent
- Assumed office 20 September 2024; Acting: 15 May 2024 – 20 September 2024
- Preceded by: Sergei Yeliseyev

Deputy Chairman of the Government of the Kaliningrad Oblast
- In office 22 September 2015 – 30 July 2016

Personal details
- Born: Alexey Sergeyevich Besprozvannykh; 23 August 1979 (age 47) Leninogorsk, East Kazakhstan Region, Kazakh SSR, Soviet Union (present-day Kazakhstan)
- Education: Altai State Technical University

Alexey Sergeyevich Besprozvannykh (Russian: Алексей Сергеевич Беспрозванных; born 23 August 1979) is a Russian politician serving as the governor of Kaliningrad Oblast since 2024.

== Biography ==
=== Education ===
In 2002, Alexey Besprozvannykh graduated with honors from the Altai State Technical University. He specialized in "Technology, Equipment, and Automation of Machine-Building Industries," earning a Master's in Engineering and Technology. The same year, he received a diploma in "Economics and Management at a Machine-Building Enterprise."

In 2008, he completed the Mini MBA program at the Academy of Business Ernst & Young, in 2010 - Executive MBA at Moscow School of Management SKOLKOVO. In 2015 - Training and Retraining of the Management Personnel Reserve at the Russian Presidential Academy of National Economy and Public Administration (RANEPA).

=== Career ===
In August 2012, he was appointed Deputy Chairman of the Government of the Voronezh Region and Head of the Department of Industry and Transport of the Voronezh Region. In June 2013, he became the Deputy Chairman of the Government of the Voronezh Region, and from March to October 2014, he served as Acting Deputy Chairman of the Government. In October 2014, he was officially appointed to this position.

In 2016, Alexey Besprozvannykh became the Director of the Department of Regional Industrial Policy and Project Management of the Ministry of Industry and Trade of the Russian Federation (Minpromtorg) in Moscow. In 2017, he was appointed Deputy Minister of Industry and Trade of Russia.

He is part of the management personnel reserve under the patronage of the Russian President. On 15 May 2024 Alexey Besprozvannykh was appointed Acting Governor of the Kaliningrad Region after Governor Anton Alikhanov moved to the post of Minister of Industry and Trade.
