= Sergei Yeliseyev (politician) =

Russian statesman and politician

- Сергей Елисеев
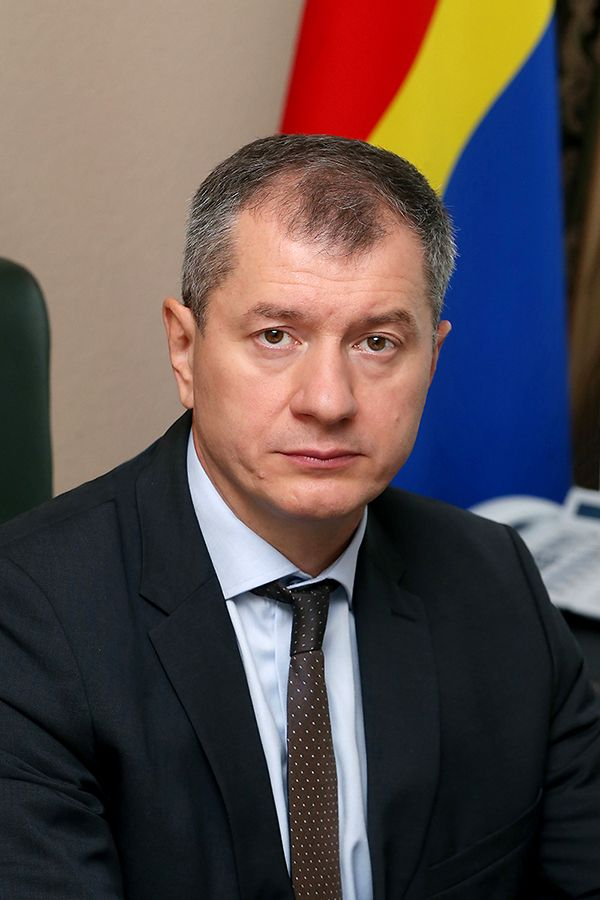
- Yeliseyev in 2017

Governor of Kaliningrad Oblast (Acting)
- In office 14 May 2024 – 15 May 2024
- President: Vladimir Putin
- Preceded by: Anton Alikhanov
- Succeeded by: Alexey Besprozvannykh

Head of Government of the Kherson Oblast Military–Civilian Administration (Russian-installed)
- In office 18 July 2022 – 25 November 2022
- Governor: Volodymyr Saldo

Head of the Kherson Oblast Military–Civilian Administration (Russian-installed, acting)
- In office 4 August 2022 – 18 September 2022
- Preceded by: Volodymyr Saldo
- Succeeded by: Volodymyr Saldo

Personal details
- Born: 5 May 1971 (age 55) Stavropol, Stavropol Krai, Russian SFSR, Soviet Union (now Russia)
- Education: Kalmyk State University, FSB Academy

Military service
- Allegiance: Federal Security Service
- Years of service: 1993 – 2005

Sergei Vladimirovich Yeliseyev (Russian: Сергей Владимирович Елисеев; born 5 May 1971) is a Russian statesman who was acting Governor of Kaliningrad Oblast. He previously was the First Deputy Chairman of the Government of the Kaliningrad Oblast in 2021-2022. In 2022, after 2022 Russian invasion of Ukraine and the occupation of the Kherson Oblast, he was appointed chairman of the government of the Russian occupation military-civilian administration of the Kherson Oblast, and later - acting head of the MCA. In November 2022, Yeliseyev returned to his previous post in the Government of the Kaliningrad Oblast.

== Biography ==
Sergei Vladimirovich Yeliseyev was born on 5 May 1971 in Stavropol. In 1993 he graduated from the Kalmyk State University, in 1998 - the FSB Academy.

In 1993-2005, Yeliseyev worked for the Federal Security Service.

From August 2014 to November 2016, he was an assistant, and then deputy head of Vologda - head of the administrative department.

Until June 2017, he worked as Deputy Chief of Staff of the Government of the Kaliningrad Region. In June 2017, he was appointed Chief Federal Inspector for the Kaliningrad Region (he was in the office of the Plenipotentiary Representative of the President of the Russian Federation in the Northwestern Federal District).

From July 17, 2021 to 2022, he was First Deputy Chairman of the Government of the Kaliningrad Oblast.

In 2022, after the Russian invasion of Ukraine, he holds positions in the Russian-occupied Kherson Oblast. On 5 July 2022, he was appointed chairman of the government of the Russian occupation Military-Civilian Administration of the Kherson Oblast. On August 4, after the hospitalization of the head of the MCA Volodymyr Saldo, he was appointed acting head of the Military-Civil Administration.

On September 18, 2022, due to the recovery of Volodymyr Saldo, he resigned as acting Head of the MCA and moved on to his main duties.

In November 2022, Yeliseyev returned to his previous post in the Government of the Kaliningrad Oblast.

He was sanctioned by the UK government on 4 October 2022 in relation to the Russo-Ukrainian War.
