= Yuri Matochkin =

Russian politician (1931–2006)

- Юрий Маточкин
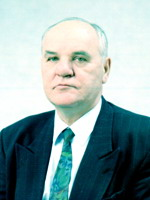

1st Governor of Kaliningrad Oblast
- In office 25 September 1991 – 20 October 1996
- Succeeded by: Leonid Gorbenko

Personal details
- Born: Yuri Semyonovich Matochkin; 18 October 1931 Simskoye, Iglinsky District, Bashkir ASSR, RSFSR, Soviet Union
- Died: 6 July 2006 (aged 74) Svetlogorsk, Kaliningrad Oblast, Russia
- Party: Independent

Yuri Semyonovich Matochkin (Russian: Юрий Семёнович Маточкин; 18 October 1931 – 6 July 2006) was a Soviet and Russian politician. He was the first post-Soviet governor of Kaliningrad Oblast, having been appointed to that position by Boris Yeltsin in September 1991. Matochkin was elected to the Federation Council in 1993 and served on the International Affairs Committee. He was a Professor of Economics.

Just prior to the breakup of the Soviet Union, a Free Economic Zone was established in Kaliningrad and Matochkin represented it in the USSR. He continued to support a free economic zone, as well as closer cooperation with the West, particularly the European Union, and placing an emphasis on foreign investment in Kaliningrad. He felt it was necessary to formulate a single state policy regarding Kaliningrad. He regarded Germany as especially important. Matochkin envisioned Kaliningrad as a free-trade region with significant administrative autonomy. He also favoured upgrading the region from an Oblast to a republic of Russia.

In 1994 he persuaded Russia to adopt a document emphasizing foreign cooperation, especially with the European Union. Matochkin succeeded in restoring Kaliningrad's special economic zone advantages in January 1996, and also secured the region's first major foreign investment, an agreement with the automobile manufacturer Kia.

Yuri Matochkin contested the 1996 elections for regional governor in 1996, and was defeated in the second round of voting by Leonid Gorbenko. After the election, Gorbenko was subjected to hounding by supporters of Matochkin.

== Personal life ==
In 1965 he married Valentina Dmitrievna. It was his second marriage. She wrote a book about Yuri Matochkin "A man. Citizen. Personality." (Russian: «Человек. Гражданин. Личность»). It was published in 2009.

== Awards ==
- Order "For Merit to the Fatherland", 4th degree (18 September 1996)
- Order of the Red Banner of Labour
- Medal "Defender of a Free Russia" (22 December 1993)
- Medal "For Distinction in the Protection of the State Borders" (26 June 1995)
