= Simskoye (rural locality) =

Simskoye Симское
- Selo
- Location within Bashkortostan Location within Russia
- Coordinates: 54°45′N 56°46′E
- Country: Russia
- Region: Bashkortostan
- District: Iglinsky District
- Time zone: UTC+5:00

Simskoye (Russian: Симское; Bashkir: Эҫем, Eśem) is a rural locality (a selo) in Austrumsky Selsoviet, Iglinsky District, Bashkortostan, Russia. The population was 82 as of 2010. There are 2 streets.

== Geography ==
Simskoye is located 38 km southeast of Iglino (the district's administrative centre) by road. Voznesenka is the nearest rural locality.
