= Nikolay Tsukanov =

Russian politician (born 1965)

- Николай Цуканов
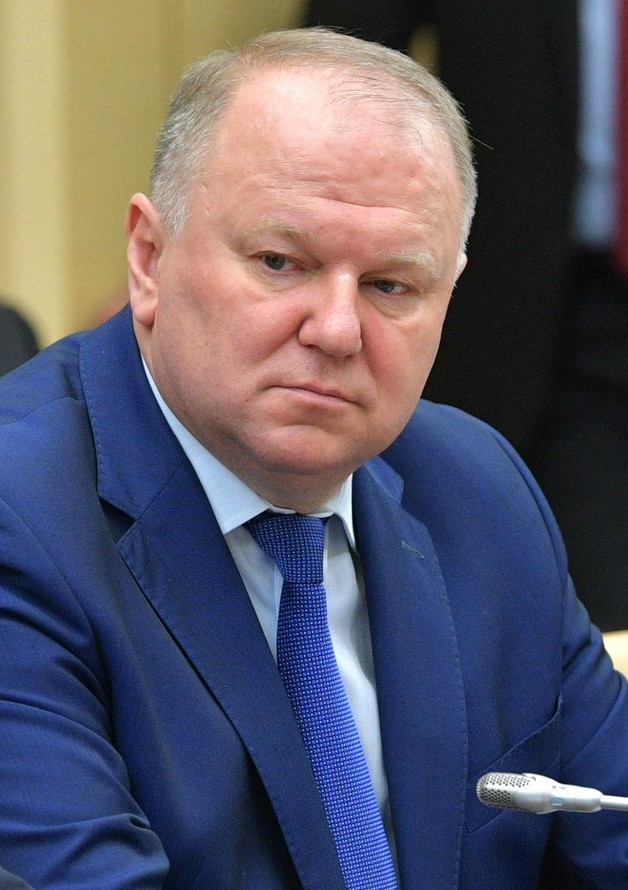
- Tsukanov in 2019

5th Russian Presidential Envoy to the Ural Federal District
- In office 26 June 2018 – 9 November 2020
- President: Vladimir Putin
- Preceded by: Igor Kholmanskikh
- Succeeded by: Vladimir Yakushev

6th Russian Presidential Envoy to the Northwestern Federal District
- In office 28 July 2016 – 25 December 2017
- President: Vladimir Putin
- Preceded by: Vladimir Bulavin
- Succeeded by: Alexander Beglov

5th Governor of Kaliningrad Oblast
- In office 28 September 2010 – 28 July 2016
- Preceded by: Georgi Boos
- Succeeded by: Yevgeny Zinichev (acting); Anton Alikhanov

Personal details
- Born: 22 March 1965 (age 61) Lipovo, Russia, Soviet Union
- Party: United Russia
- Education: Saint Petersburg State Agrarian University; Northwestern Management Institute
- Profession: Psychologist, businessman, Electrical engineer

Nikolay Nikolayevich Tsukanov (born 22 March 1965) is a Russian politician, psychologist, businessman, electrical welder, former governor of Kaliningrad Oblast, and, between July 2016 and December 2017, President Vladimir Putin's plenipotentiary envoy to the Northwestern Federal District. He has the federal state civilian service rank of 1st class Active State Councillor of the Russian Federation.

Nikolay Tsukanov was born in 1965 in the village of Lipovo, in the Gusev area of Kaliningrad Oblast, Russian SFSR, Soviet Union. Upon graduating from school in 1980 he entered a local special professional technical college (SPTU)) and obtained a specialist degree as an electrical welder. He served in the Soviet army from 1983 to 1985, in a space communications guard battalion stationed in Czechoslovakia.

At age 14 Tsukanov began working as a combiner's assistant, later becoming an electrical welder at the Micromotor factory in Gusev. After 1985 he began to gain prominence as a local Komsomol leader. In the early 1990s he became a relatively successful businessman, graduating in 1999 from the Higher School of Privatization and Entrepreneurship with a specialism in law. In 2002 he became a degree candidate in psychology.

In 2005 Tsukanov was elected mayor of Gusev, going on in 2009 to become head of the Gusev municipal area, a position in which he successfully improved living conditions within the rather economically depressed area. In March 2009 he became chairman of the Council of municipal formations of Kaliningrad Oblast. In 2010 he was elected secretary of the local political council of the United Russia party, and on 28 September 2010 he became Governor of Kaliningrad Oblast.

On 26 June 2018, Tsukanov replaced Igor Kholmanskikh as the presidential envoy to Ural Federal District.
