= Anton Alikhanov =

Russian politician (born 1986)

- Антон Алиханов
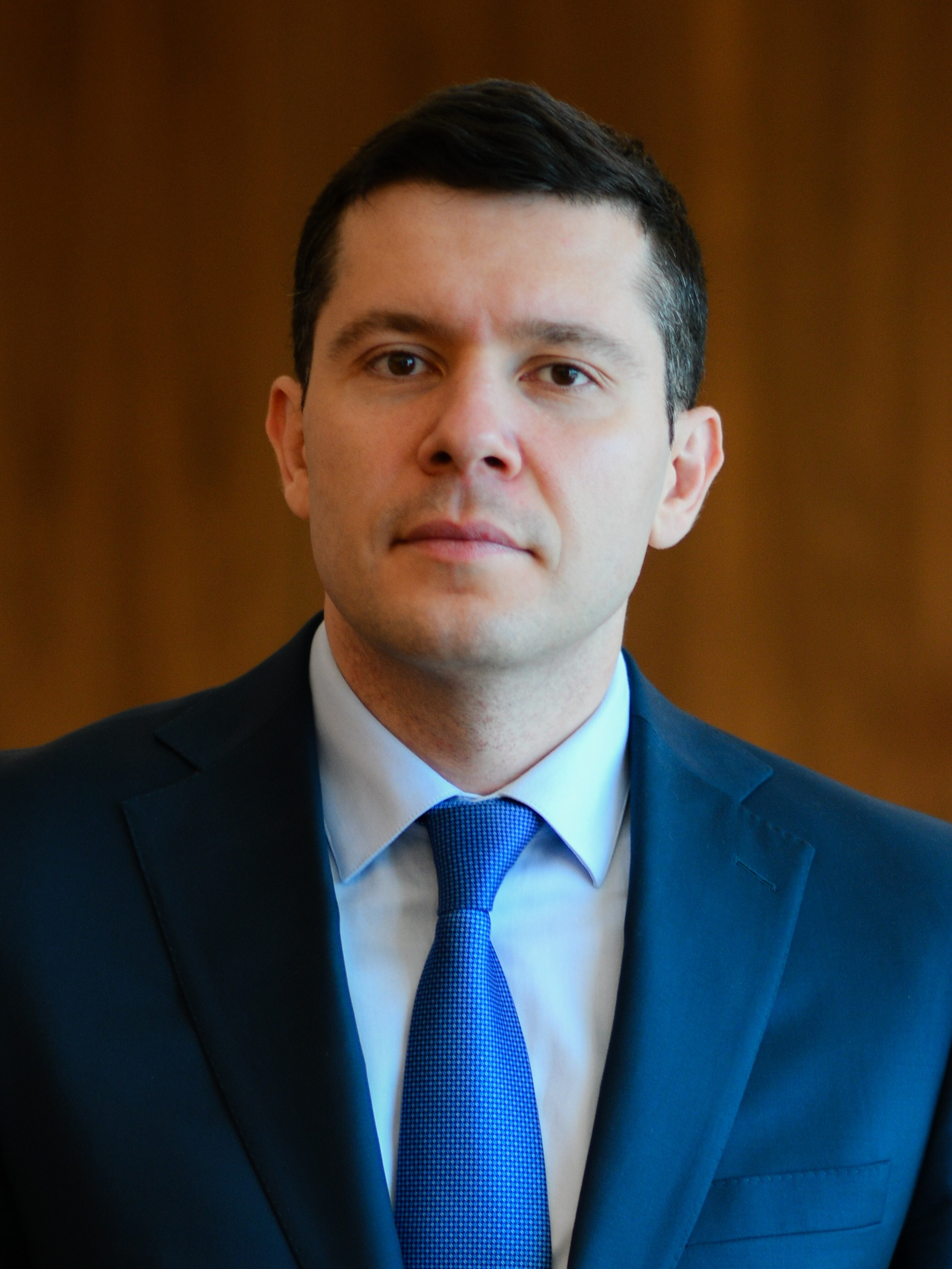
- Alikhanov in 2024

Minister of Industry and Trade
- Incumbent
- Assumed office 14 May 2024
- President: Vladimir Putin
- Prime Minister: Mikhail Mishustin
- Preceded by: Denis Manturov

6th Governor of Kaliningrad Oblast
- In office 29 September 2017 – 14 May 2024
- President: Vladimir Putin
- Preceded by: Nikolay Tsukanov; Yevgeny Zinichev (acting)
- Succeeded by: Sergei Yeliseyev (acting); Alexey Besprozvannykh

Deputy Chairman of the Government of the Kaliningrad Oblast
- In office 22 September 2015 – 30 July 2016

Personal details
- Born: Anton Andreyevich Alikhanov; 17 September 1986 (age 39) Sukhumi, Abkhaz ASSR, Georgian SSR, Soviet Union (present-day Georgia)
- Party: United Russia
- Spouse: Daria Abramova
- Children: 2
- Education: FinU; Plekhanov Russian Economic University

Anton Andreyevich Alikhanov (Russian: Анто́н Андре́евич Алиха́нов; born 17 September 1986) is a Russian politician, candidate of economic sciences, and a lawyer. He has served as the Minister of Industry and Trade since May 2024. Previously he was the governor of Kaliningrad Oblast from September 2017 until May 2024.

Alikhanov was the youngest Governor in Russia until May 2018, when Dmitry Artyukhov became the Governor of the Yamal-Nenets Autonomous Okrug.

He is a member of the ruling party of Russian Federation United Russia.

== Biography ==
Anton Alikhanov was born on September 17, 1986, in the city of Sukhumi (part of the Abkhaz ASSR) in the Georgian SSR, to a father of Caucasus Greek and Russian Cossack descent and a mother of Georgian and Russian descent.

According to media reports, his father Andrei Alikhanov was one of the founders of a large company Rosmysomoltorg (with a 20% stake) and is an old friend of former First Deputy Prime Minister Igor Shuvalov and businessman Oleg Mitvol. In the 1990s, Mikhail Babich, Plenipotentiary Representative of the President of the Russian Federation in the Privolzhsky Federal District, worked with Anton's father.

He graduated from the All-Russian State Tax Academy of the Ministry of Finance of Russia with a major in Finance and Credit and Jurisprudence.

In 2010, he worked in the Ministry of Justice of the Russian Federation.

In 2012, at the Plekhanov Russian Economic University in Moscow, he defended his thesis for the degree of candidate of economic sciences on the topic "Managing costs for the development of the organizational culture of the company" in the specialty "Economics and management of the national economy (management)" (supervisor - Doctor of Economics, Professor A Govorin).

In 2013, he worked in the Ministry of Industry and Trade of the Russian Federation, where he served as Deputy Director of the Department of State Regulation of Foreign Trade Activities, then - Director.

On 14 August 2015, he became a member of the advisory council on industry at the board of the Eurasian Economic Commission.

On 22 September 2015, he was appointed Deputy Chairman of the Kaliningrad Regional Government in charge of agriculture and industry.

On 30 July 2016, he became Acting Chairman of the Government of the Kaliningrad Oblast.

On 6 October 2016, in accordance with Presidential Decree No. 529, President Vladimir Putin, appointed him Acting Governor of the Kaliningrad Oblast. He was confirmed in the post in the Russian gubernatorial election in 2017 by 81,06% votes of electors.

In March 2021 Alikhanov announced the intention to participate in the elections the governor of the Kaliningrad oblast in 2022 which he won with 80.21% of votes.

According to Putin, Anton Alikhanov was one of the authors of the medium-term plan for the strategic development of the Kaliningrad Oblast, which Alikhanov, already in a new position, together with the Government of the Russian Federation, is tasked to complete and develop.

On 14 May 2024 he was appointed by President Vladimir Putin as Minister of Industry and Trade.

=== Personal life ===
Anton Alikhanov is married to Daria Abramova and has two children. His wife’s grandfather, Mogeli Shalvovich Khubutia, is the chief doctor of the Moscow Research Institute of Sklifosovsky. Other relatives include the president of the Union of Georgians in Russia and businessman Mikhail Khubutia, own the company Rosimpex, which calls itself one of the largest suppliers of hunting and sporting weapons in Russia. The brother of the vice-governor - Georgy Alikhanov is studying at the Moscow State University of Medicine and Dentistry and playing in a musical group.

==== Income ====
The declared income of Anton Alikhanov in Russia in 2015 amounted to 2.209.919,98 rubles. In 2020 he earned 20,4 million rubles and owned three flats 210, 198.5 and 85.8 sq. m. and a Volkswagen Tiguan.

==== Sanctions ====
In December 2022, the Office of Foreign Assets Control of the United States Department of the Treasury added Alikhanov and 28 other governors of the federal subjects of Russia to the Specially Designated Nationals and Blocked Persons List due to their involvement in the enforcement of the conscription of Russian citizens in response to the mobilization order in September 2022 during the Russian invasion of Ukraine.

==== Views ====
Alikhanov has blamed 18th century philosopher Immanuel Kant, who lived in what is now Kaliningrad, for causing “the global chaos, the global realignment that we are now facing” and therefore being “directly related to the military conflict in Ukraine”.

== Personal life ==
His wife, Darya Vyacheslavovna Abramova (b. 1986), graduated in 2009 from the Faculty of International Journalism at MGIMO, the Moscow State Institute of International Relations under the Russian Ministry of Foreign Affairs[4]. After graduation, she worked as a television editor. The couple has three children: Andrey (b. 2012), Polina (b. 2015), and Vladimir (b. 2018).
