= Legislative Assembly of Kaliningrad Oblast =

Regional parliament of Kaliningrad Oblast, Russia

Legislative Assembly of Kaliningrad Oblast Законодательное собрание Калининградской области
- 8th legislature

Type
- Type: Unicameral

Leadership
- Chairman: Andrey Kropotkin, United Russia since 8 October 2026

Structure
- Seats: 40
- Political groups: United Russia (32) CPRF (3); LDPR (2); New People (2) SRZP (1)

Elections
- Voting system: Mixed
- Last election: 18-20 September 2026

Meeting place
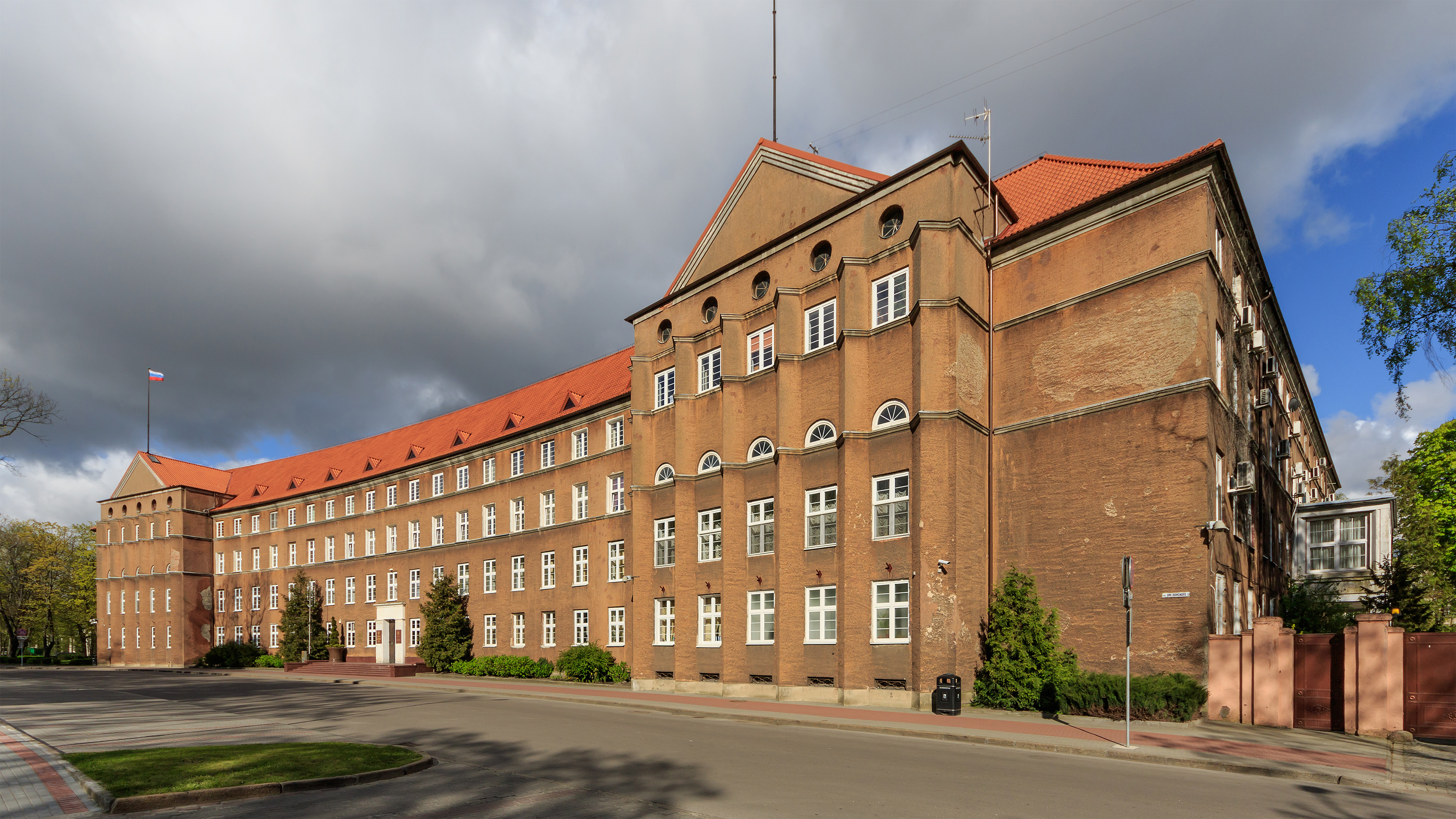
- 17 Kirov Street, Kaliningrad, Kaliningrad Oblast, Russia, 236000

Website
- zaksob39.ru

The Legislative Assembly of Kaliningrad Oblast (Russian: Законодательное собрание Калининградской области, romanized: Zakonodatel'noye sobraniye Kaliningradskoy oblasti), formerly the Kaliningrad Oblast Duma (Note: Russian: Калининградская областная дума, romanized: Kaliningradskaya oblastnaya duma) until April 2022, is the regional parliament of Kaliningrad Oblast, a federal subject of Russia. A total of 40 deputies are elected for five-year terms.

== Elections ==
=== 2006 ===
Party	Seats
United Russia	10
Communist Party of the Russian Federation	4
Russian Party of Pensioners for Social Justice	2
Liberal Democratic Party of Russia	2
Patriots of Russia	2

=== 2011 ===
Party	Seats
United Russia	22
Communist Party of the Russian Federation	6
A Just Russia — For Truth	2
Civic Platform	2
Liberal Democratic Party of Russia	2
Patriots of Russia	2
Independents	3

=== 2016 ===
Party	Seats
United Russia	29
Communist Party of the Russian Federation	4
Liberal Democratic Party of Russia	4
Civic Platform	2
A Just Russia — For Truth	1
Patriots of Russia	1
Independents	1

=== 2021 ===
Party	Seats
United Russia	29
Communist Party of the Russian Federation	6
A Just Russia — For Truth	2
Liberal Democratic Party of Russia	2
Russian Party of Pensioners for Social Justice	1

=== 2026 ===
Party	Seats
United Russia	32
Communist Party of the Russian Federation	3
Liberal Democratic Party of Russia	2
New People	2
A Just Russia — For Truth	1
