= Administrative divisions of Kaliningrad Oblast =

Kaliningrad Oblast Russia
- Administrative centre: Kaliningrad

Administrative structure (as of 2013)
- Districts: 13
- Cities/towns: 21
- Urban-type settlements: 3
- Selsovets: 99

Municipal structure (as of 2002)
- Rural settlements: 1,079 (inhabited); 4 (uninhabited)

Kaliningrad Oblast is a federal subject of Russia.

== Administrative and municipal divisions ==
Map

- ※ - under the oblast's jurisdiction

Division		Structure		OKATO	OKTMO	Urban-type settlement/ district-level town*	Rural (rural okrug)
Division		Administrative	Municipal	OKATO	OKTMO	Urban-type settlement/ district-level town*	Rural (rural okrug)
Kaliningrad (Калининград)		city	urban okrug	27 401	27 701		
↳	Leningradsky (Ленинградский)	(under Kaliningrad)	—N/a	27 401	—N/a		
↳	Moskovsky (Московский)	(under Kaliningrad)	—N/a	27 401	—N/a		
↳	Tsentralny (Центральный)	(under Kaliningrad)	—N/a	27 401	—N/a		
Baltiysk (Балтийск)		city	urban okrug	27 405	27 605	Primorsk (Приморск)	
Pionersky (Пионерский)		city	urban okrug	27 417	27 717		
Svetlogorsk (Светлогорск)		city	urban okrug	27 420	27 634		
Yantarny (Янтарный)		urban-type settlement※	urban okrug	27 420	27 740		
Svetly (Светлый)		city	urban okrug	27 425	27 725		
Sovetsk (Советск)		city	urban okrug	27 430	27 730		
Bagrationovsky (Багратионовский)		district	urban okrug	27 203	27 603	Bagrationovsk (Багратионовск) town*	11
↳	Ladushkin (Ладушкин)	(under Bagrationovsky)	urban okrug	27 403	27 711		
↳	Mamonovo (Мамоново)	(under Bagrationovsky)	urban okrug	27 403	27 712		
Gvardeysky (Гвардейский)		district	urban okrug	27 206	27 706	Gvardeysk (Гвардейск) town*	6
Guryevsky (Гурьевский)		district	urban okrug	27 209	27 707	Guryevsk (Гурьевск) town*	9
Gusevsky (Гусевский)		district	urban okrug	27 212	27 709	Gusev (Гусев) town*	7
Zelenogradsky (Зеленоградский)		district	urban okrug	27 215	27 615	Zelenogradsk (Зеленоградск) town*	9
Krasnoznamensky (Краснознаменский)		district	urban okrug	27 218	27 618	Krasnoznamensk (Краснознаменск) town*	7
Nemansky (Неманский)		district	urban okrug	27 221	27 621	Neman (Неман) town*	9
Nesterovsky (Нестеровский)		district	urban okrug	27 224	27 624	Nesterov (Нестеров) town*	7
Ozyorsky (Озёрский)		district	urban okrug	27 227	27 716	Ozyorsk (Озёрск) town*	6
Polessky (Полесский)		district	urban okrug	27 230	27 630	Polessk (Полесск) town*	6
Pravdinsky (Правдинский)		district	urban okrug	27 233	27 633	Pravdinsk (Правдинск) town*; Zheleznodorozhny (Железнодорожный)	8
Slavsky (Славский)		district	urban okrug	27 236	27 636	Slavsk (Славск) town*	7
Chernyakhovsky (Черняховский)		district	urban okrug	27 239	27 639	Chernyakhovsk (Черняховск) town*	7
