= Krasnoznamensky =

Krasnoznamensky (masculine), Krasnoznamenskaya (feminine), or Krasnoznamenskoye (neuter) may refer to:

- Krasnoznamensky District, a district of Kaliningrad Oblast, Russia
- Krasnoznamensky Urban Okrug, a municipal formation into which Krasnoznamensky District in Kaliningrad Oblast, Russia is incorporated
- Krasnoznamenskoye Urban Settlement, a former municipal formation into which the town of district significance of Krasnoznamensk in Krasnoznamensky District of Kaliningrad Oblast, Russia was incorporated
- Krasnoznamensky (rural locality) (Krasnoznamenskaya, Krasnoznamenskoye), several rural localities in Russia
