= Krasnoznamensky (rural locality) =

Rural localities in Russia

Krasnoznamensky (Russian: Краснознаменский; masculine), Krasnoznamenskaya (Краснознаменская; feminine), or Krasnoznamenskoye (Краснознаменское; neuter) is the name of several rural localities in Russia.

== Altai Krai ==
As of 2010, one rural locality in Altai Krai bears this name:

- Krasnoznamensky, Altai Krai, a settlement in Krasnoznamensky Selsoviet of Kuryinsky District

== Bryansk Oblast ==
As of 2010, one rural locality in Bryansk Oblast bears this name:

- Krasnoznamensky, Bryansk Oblast, a settlement in Baklansky Selsoviet of Pochepsky District

== Kaliningrad Oblast ==
As of 2010, two rural localities in Kaliningrad Oblast bear this name:

- Krasnoznamenskoye, Bagrationovsky District, Kaliningrad Oblast, a settlement in Dolgorukovsky Rural Okrug of Bagrationovsky District
- Krasnoznamenskoye, Slavsky District, Kaliningrad Oblast, a settlement in Bolshakovsky Rural Okrug of Slavsky District

== Kurgan Oblast ==
As of 2010, one rural locality in Kurgan Oblast bears this name:

- Krasnoznamenskoye, Kurgan Oblast, a selo in Krasnoznamensky Selsoviet of Mishkinsky District

== Mari El Republic ==
As of 2010, one rural locality in the Mari El Republic bears this name:

- Krasnoznamensky, Mari El Republic, a khutor in Emekovsky Rural Okrug of Volzhsky District

== Moscow Oblast ==
As of 2010, one rural locality in Moscow Oblast bears this name:

- Krasnoznamensky, Moscow Oblast, a settlement under the administrative jurisdiction of the City of Shchyolkovo in Shchyolkovsky District

== Oryol Oblast ==
As of 2010, two rural localities in Oryol Oblast bear this name:

- Krasnoznamensky, Kromskoy District, Oryol Oblast, a settlement in Retyazhsky Selsoviet of Kromskoy District
- Krasnoznamensky, Uritsky District, Oryol Oblast, a settlement in Arkhangelsky Selsoviet of Uritsky District

== Saratov Oblast ==
As of 2010, one rural locality in Saratov Oblast bears this name:

- Krasnoznamensky, Saratov Oblast, a settlement in Samoylovsky District

== Vladimir Oblast ==
As of 2010, one rural locality in Vladimir Oblast bears this name:

- Krasnoznamensky, Vladimir Oblast, a settlement in Kameshkovsky District
