= Dobrovolsk =

Village in Kaliningrad Oblast, Russia

Dobrovolsk Добровольск Pillkallen (1545 – 1938) Schloßberg (1938 – 1947)
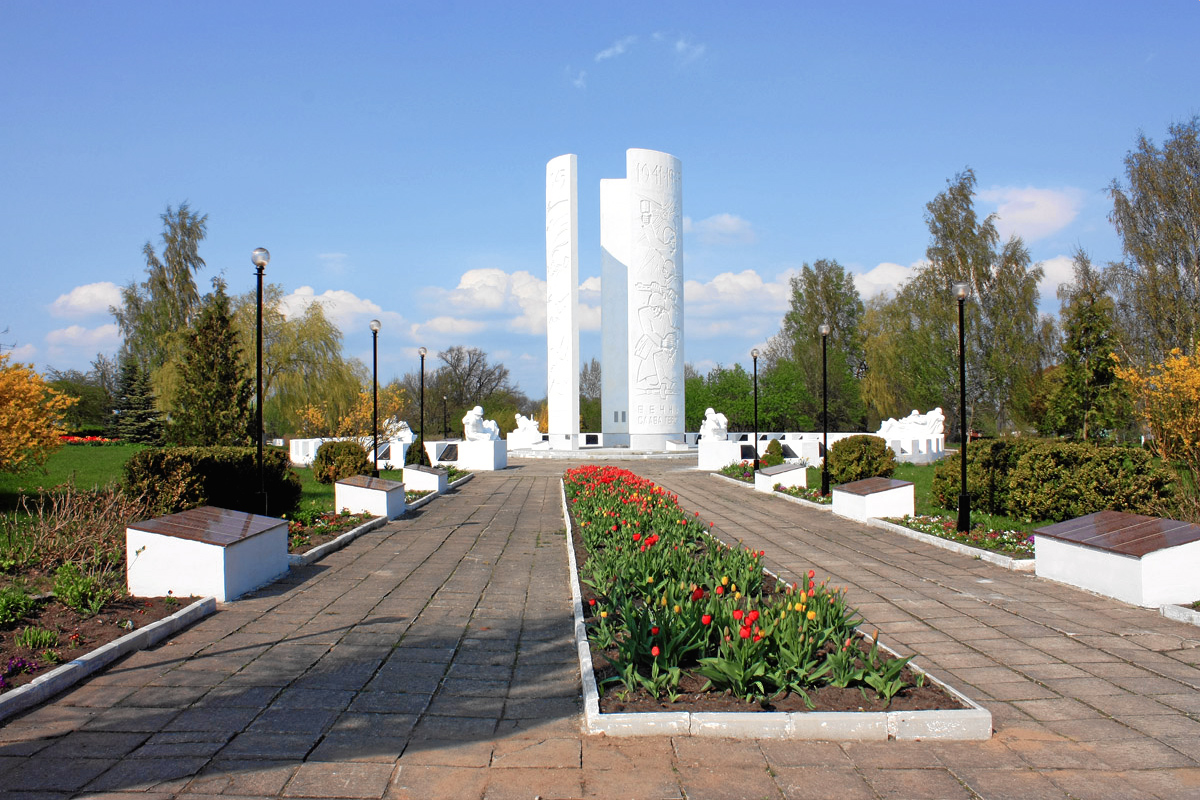
- The memorial complex to soldiers killed in World War II

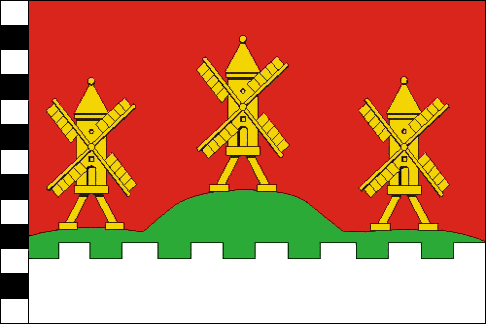
- Flag
- Interactive map of Dobrovolsk
- Location of Dobrovolsk Dobrovolsk (European Russia) Dobrovolsk (Russia)
- Coordinates: 54°46′0″N 22°31′0″E
- Country: Russia
- Federal subject: Kaliningrad Oblast
- Administrative district: Krasnoznamensky District
- Earliest surviving record: 1510

Population (2010 Census)
  - Total: 1,693
  - Estimate (2010): 1,693 (0%)
- Time zone: UTC+2 (MSK–1)
- Postal code: 238743
- OKTMO ID: 27713000291

Dobrovolsk (Russian: Доброво́льск, lit. "Voluntary Town"; German: Pillkallen (1510–1938) or Schloßberg (1938–1947); Lithuanian: Pilkalnis; Polish: Pilkały) is a village in Krasnoznamensky District of Kaliningrad Oblast, Russia. It has a population of 1,693 (2010). It is located in the historical region of Lithuania Minor.

It lies approximately 17 kilometres (11 mi) north of Nesterov and 30 kilometres (19 mi) north-east of Gusev.

== Location ==
Dobrovolsk is located approximately 12 km (8 miles) to the north of Nesterov and 15 km (9 miles) south of the regional capital of Krasnoznamensk. It is approximately 25 km (16 miles) to the south of the border with Lithuania, which between 1945 and 1990 was an internal border within the Soviet Union but has subsequently become an international border. The city of Kaliningrad itself is approximately 150 km (92 miles) to the west on the far side of Kaliningrad Oblast.

== History ==
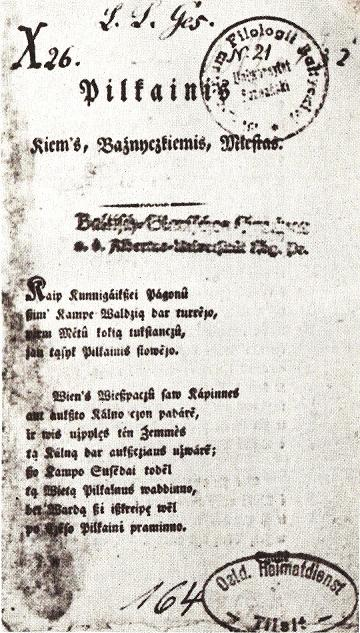
18th-century Lithuanian poem Pilkainis about the town by local poet Kristijonas Gotlybas Milkus

Russian sources give the date of the earliest record of the village as 1510, while the earliest surviving German language record dates from 1516 under the name Schlosbergk, and slightly later the name Mühlenberg is also used. Nevertheless, it is believed that there was already a trading settlement in existence before this. The name Pillkallen first appears in the records in 1545 in connection with an inheritance dispute, and is thought to have originated with Lithuanian inhabitants derived from the Lithuanian language term pilkalnis, meaning mound or castle mound. In 1549 a wooden church was built in the developing market town and a school was established in 1550. Since 1466, it was part of the Kingdom of Poland as a fief held by the Teutonic Order, and after its secularization in 1525, it was located in Ducal Prussia, a vassal duchy of the Kingdom of Poland, part of the Polish–Lithuanian Commonwealth.

From 1701, the village belonged to the Kingdom of Prussia. Between 1709 and 1711 the population was devastated by plague, but the village was reinhabited by a wave of Protestant settlers from Nassau. The king Frederick William I of Prussia granted Pillkallen along with nearby Gumbinnen (now Gusev) town privileges in 1725, and stone church was built in 1756 using locally produced fieldstones. Pillkallen became an administrative sub-centre under Gumbinnen, and two centuries of moderate prosperity followed during which Pillkallen became known for local agricultural fairs and for the quality of local agricultural produce, including cheeses and the local Pillkanis beer. The town became part of the German Empire during the unification of Germany in 1871, and was located in the province of East Prussia until 1945. In 1886, the town had a population of 2,749, mostly employed in agriculture. The district had a mixed population of Poles, Lithuanians, Germans, Greeks and Jews. In 1892 the town saw the opening of a railway connection to Stallupönen (now Nesterov) followed in 1901 by a narrow gauge railway to Lasdehnen (now Krasnoznamensk).

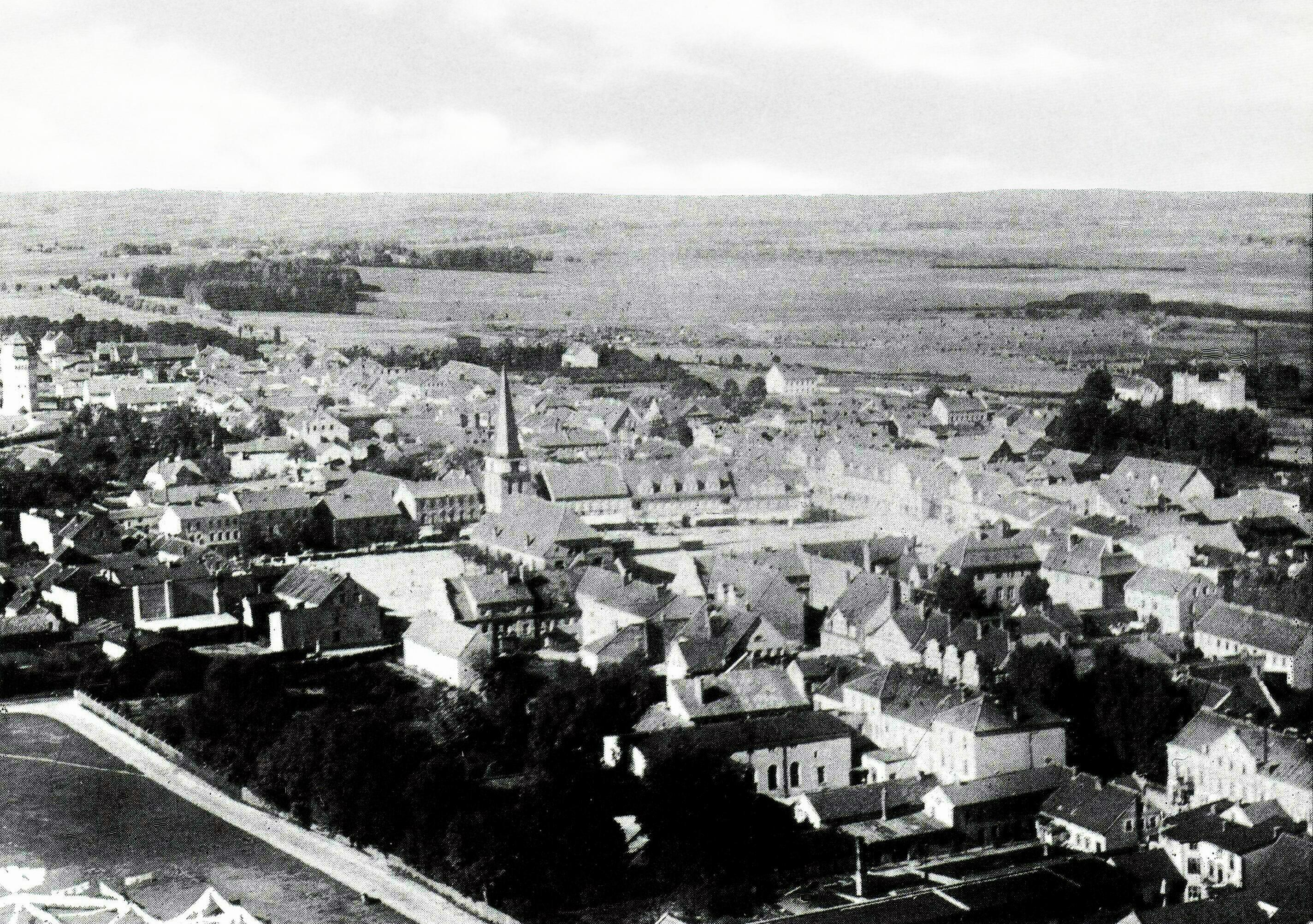
Aerial view in the 1930s

With the outbreak of World War I, Pillkallen was attacked by the invading Russian Imperial Army under Lt. Gen. Khan of Nakhichevan in August 1914, and again between October 1914 and January 1915, which led to the town being almost entirely destroyed. After the end of the war in 1918, it was rebuilt with help from Breslau (now Wrocław) which was then in Germany and Pillkallen's partner town. Between 1933 and 1934 a hospital able to accommodate 130 patients was opened, as well as a sports stadium and a municipal swimming pool. In 1938, during a massive Nazi campaign of renaming of placenames, the Nazi German government renamed the town from Pillkallen (due to its Lithuanian origins) to Schloßberg.

In 1944, during the later stages World War II when the Soviet Union had entered Germany, the area was assigned to the 3rd Belorussian Front of the Red Army. In the closing months of war the village found itself at the centre of bitter fighting between the Red Army and the German Wehrmacht, changing hands four times until 15 January 1945 when it was finally held by the Red Army. Schloßberg was again destroyed and all that was left of the eighteenth-century church was its stone font. Schloßberg was located in the section of East Prussia ceded to the Soviet Union, forming Kaliningrad Oblast, and became the administrative center of the short-lived Pilkalensky District until 1947 when Krasnoznamensky District was formed in its place, and the administrative functions moved to Krasnoznamensk as it had been less damaged during the war. Schloßberg lost its municipal status and was renamed Dobrovolsk, meaning "voluntary town", reportedly because the German soldiers in the village eventually surrendered to the Red Army rather than continue fighting. Dobrovolsk was formally designated a village (Добровольский сельский Совет) and in 1990 its municipal status was modified to "rural district" (Добровольский сельский округ). By the end of the twentieth century, the village and its immediate surroundings remained largely destroyed from war damage.

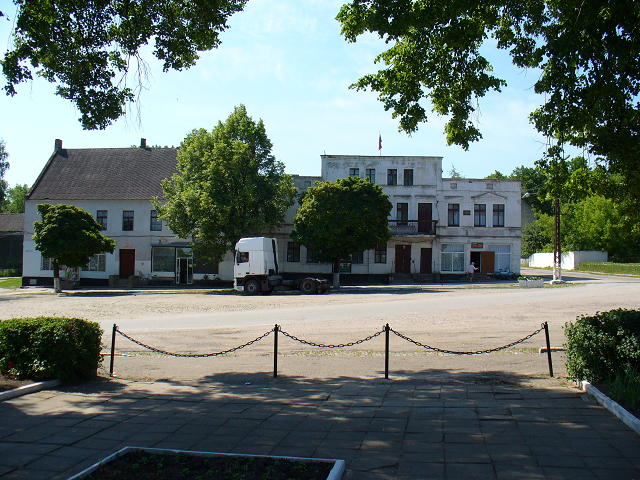
Preserved old houses at the market square in 2006

On July 30, 2009, the flag and the coat of arms of Dobrovolsk were approved.

== Memorials and cemeteries ==
Although much of the town remains destroyed from World War II, it is nevertheless home to numerous memorials and cemeteries reflecting the fighting of the recent centuries. An obelisk commemorates Prussian soldiers killed in the Franco-Prussian War of 1870–1871, and there is a First World War cemetery containing the graves of fallen Germans and Russian soldiers. A Soviet Memorial Complex commemorating the fallen of the World War II, of whom approximately 5,300 are buried here.

== Demography ==
Population
1875	1880	1886	1890	1910	1933	1939	2010
2,386	2,648	2,749	2,869	4,347	5,005	5,833	1,693

Where religion is recorded from the census process, pre-1945 census data show the religious affiliation of the population as overwhelmingly Prussian Evangelical. In 1890, 34 people were recorded as Jewish and 8 people were recorded as Roman Catholic.

== Culture ==
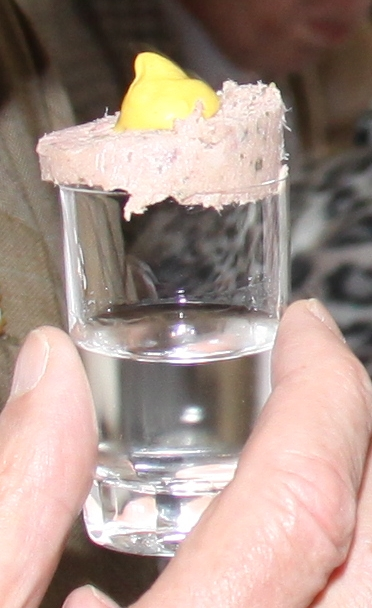
Pillkaller

Pillkaller Machandel, a liquor made using corn brandy/schnapps, liver sausage and mustard, is named after the town.

== Notable people ==
- Johann Heinrich Wloemer (1726–1797), German Jurist
- Martha Asmus (1844–?), German writer
- Erich Dunskus (1890–1967), German Actor
- Horst Salomon (1929–1972), German Writer
- Ralf-Peter Devaux (born 1940), German Secret Service Worker
- Bernd Altenstein (born 1943), German Sculptor
