= Gvardeysky District =

Gvardeysky District Гвардейский район (Russian)
- District
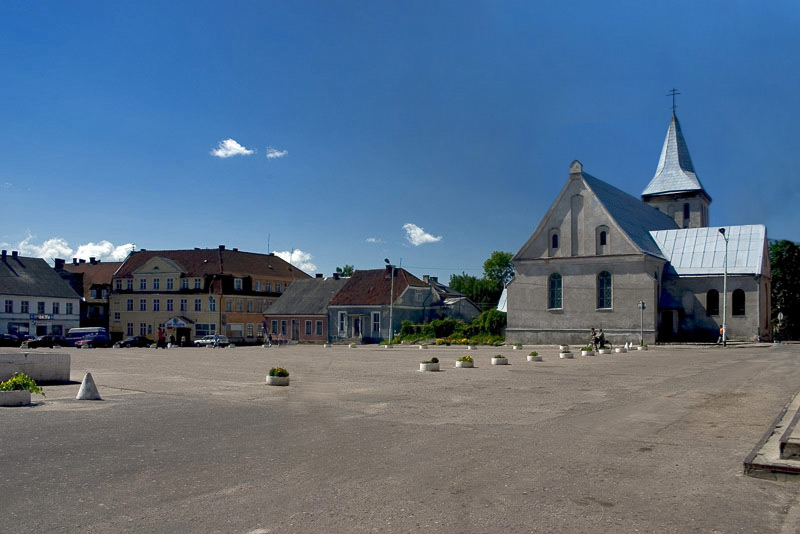
- Gvardeisk market, Gvardeysky District

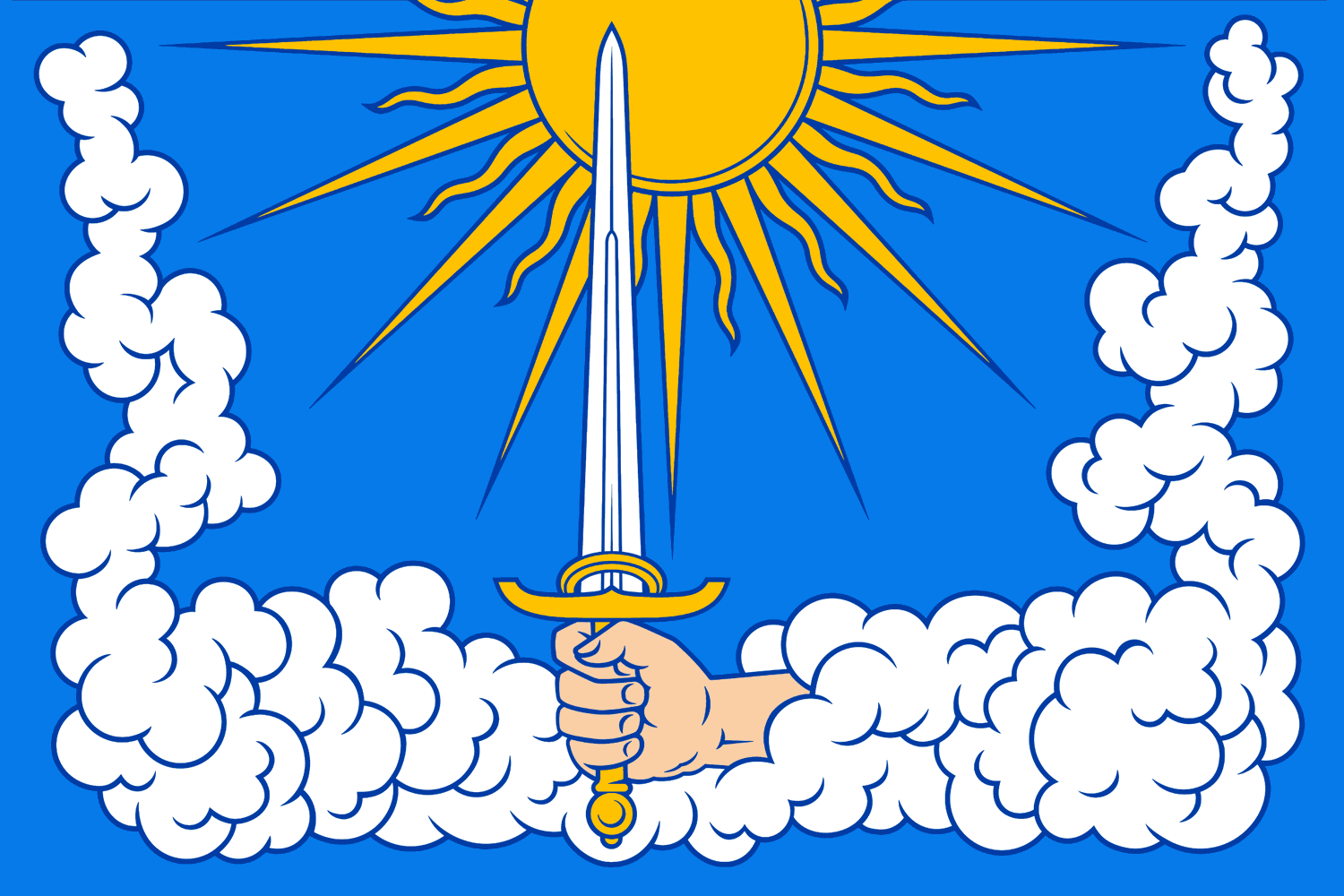
- Flag Coat of arms
- Location of Gvardeysky District in Kaliningrad Oblast
- Coordinates: 54°39′N 21°04′E
- Country: Russia
- Federal subject: Kaliningrad Oblast
- Established: 1946
- Administrative center: Gvardeysk

Area
  - Total: 783 km^{2} (302 sq mi)

Population (2010 Census)
  - Total: 29,926
  - Density: 38.2/km^{2} (99.0/sq mi)
  - Urban: 46.4%
  - Rural: 53.6%

Administrative structure
  - Administrative divisions: 1 Towns of district significance, 4 Rural okrugs
  - Inhabited localities: 1 cities/towns, 61 rural localities

Municipal structure
  - Municipally incorporated as: Gvardeysky Urban Okrug
- Time zone: UTC+2 (MSK–1)
- OKTMO ID: 27706000
- Website: http://gvardeysk.gov39.ru/

Gvardeysky District (Russian: Гвардейский район) is an administrative district (raion), one of the fifteen in Kaliningrad Oblast, Russia. It is located in the center of the oblast. The area of the district is 783 square kilometers (302 sq mi). Its administrative center is the town of Gvardeysk. Population: 29,926 (2010 census); 32,101 (2002 Census); 27,299 (1989 Soviet census). The population of Gvardeysk accounts for 46.4% of the district's total population.

== Geography ==
The district is situated in the center of the oblast, east of Kaliningrad, the administrative center of the oblast.

Main rivers in the district include the Pregolya and its branch the Deyma.

== Administrative and municipal status ==
Within the framework of administrative divisions, Gvardeysky District is one of the fifteen in the oblast. The town of Gvardeysk serves as its administrative center.

As a municipal division, the district has been incorporated as Gvardeysky Urban Okrug since June 11, 2014. Prior to that date, the district was incorporated as Gvardeysky Municipal District, which was subdivided into one urban settlement and four rural settlements.

== Demographics ==
The district is among the more densely populated districts of the oblast.

== Economy ==
The district has an agrarian economy. The main railway and road linking Kaliningrad to Moscow both pass through it, running parallel to the Pregolya.
