= Pravdinsky District =

Pravdinsky District Правдинский район (Russian)
- District
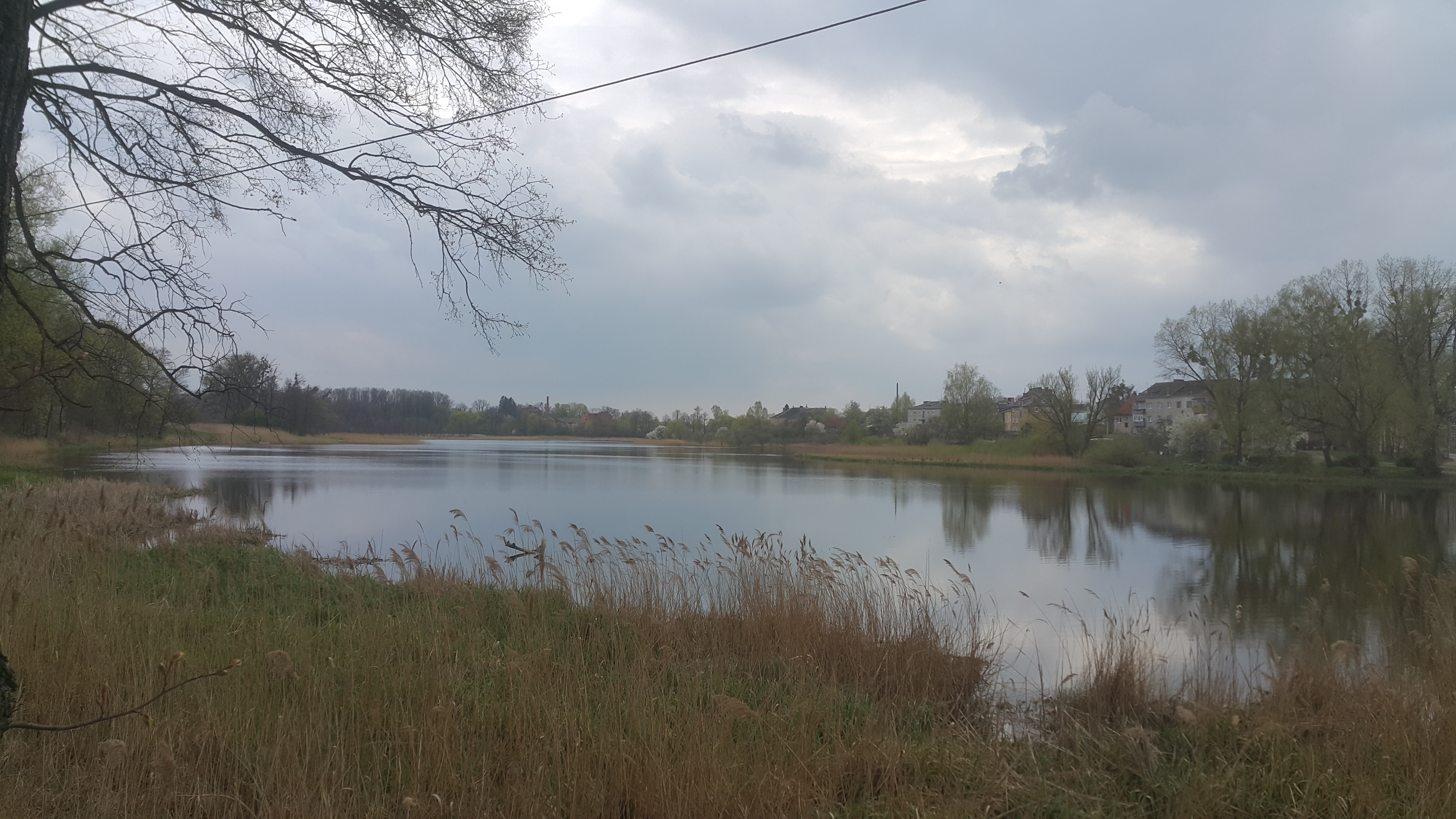
- Zheleznodorozhny Park, a protected area of Russia in Pravdinsky District

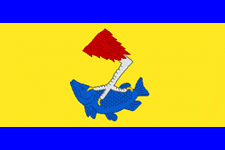
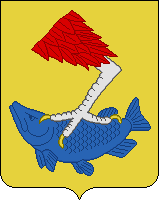
- Flag Coat of arms
- Location of Pravdinsky District in Kaliningrad Oblast
- Coordinates: 54°27′N 21°01′E
- Country: Russia
- Federal subject: Kaliningrad Oblast
- Established: 7 April 1946
- Administrative center: Pravdinsk

Area
  - Total: 1,300 km^{2} (500 sq mi)

Population (2010 Census)
  - Total: 19,061
  - Density: 15/km^{2} (38/sq mi)
  - Urban: 37.2%
  - Rural: 62.8%

Administrative structure
  - Administrative divisions: 1 Towns of district significance, 1 Urban-type settlements of district significance, 2 Rural okrugs
  - Inhabited localities: 1 cities/towns, 1 urban-type settlements, 115 rural localities

Municipal structure
  - Municipally incorporated as: Pravdinsky Urban Okrug
- Time zone: UTC+2 (MSK–1)
- OKTMO ID: 27633000
- Website: http://pravdinsk.gov39.ru

Pravdinsky District (Russian: Пра́вдинский райо́н) is an administrative district (raion), one of the fifteen in Kaliningrad Oblast, Russia. It is located in the south of the oblast. The area of the district is 1,300 square kilometers (500 sq mi). Its administrative center is the town of Pravdinsk. Population: 19,061 (2010 census); 21,076 (2002 Census); 19,555 (1989 Soviet census). The population of Pravdinsk accounts for 22.7% of the district's total population.

== Geography ==
The district is situated in the south of the oblast, at the border with Poland. It is sparsely populated. The Lava River flows through the district.

== Administrative and municipal status ==
Within the framework of administrative divisions, Pravdinsky District is one of the fifteen in the oblast.

As a municipal division, the district has been incorporated as Pravdinsky Urban Okrug since May 5, 2015. Prior to that date, the district was incorporated as Pravdinsky Municipal District, which was subdivided into two urban settlements and two rural settlements.

== Economy ==
District economy is agrarian. No major roads or railways pass through the district, yet bus lines carry the public transit.
