= Gusevsky District =

Gusevsky District Гусевский район (Russian)
- District
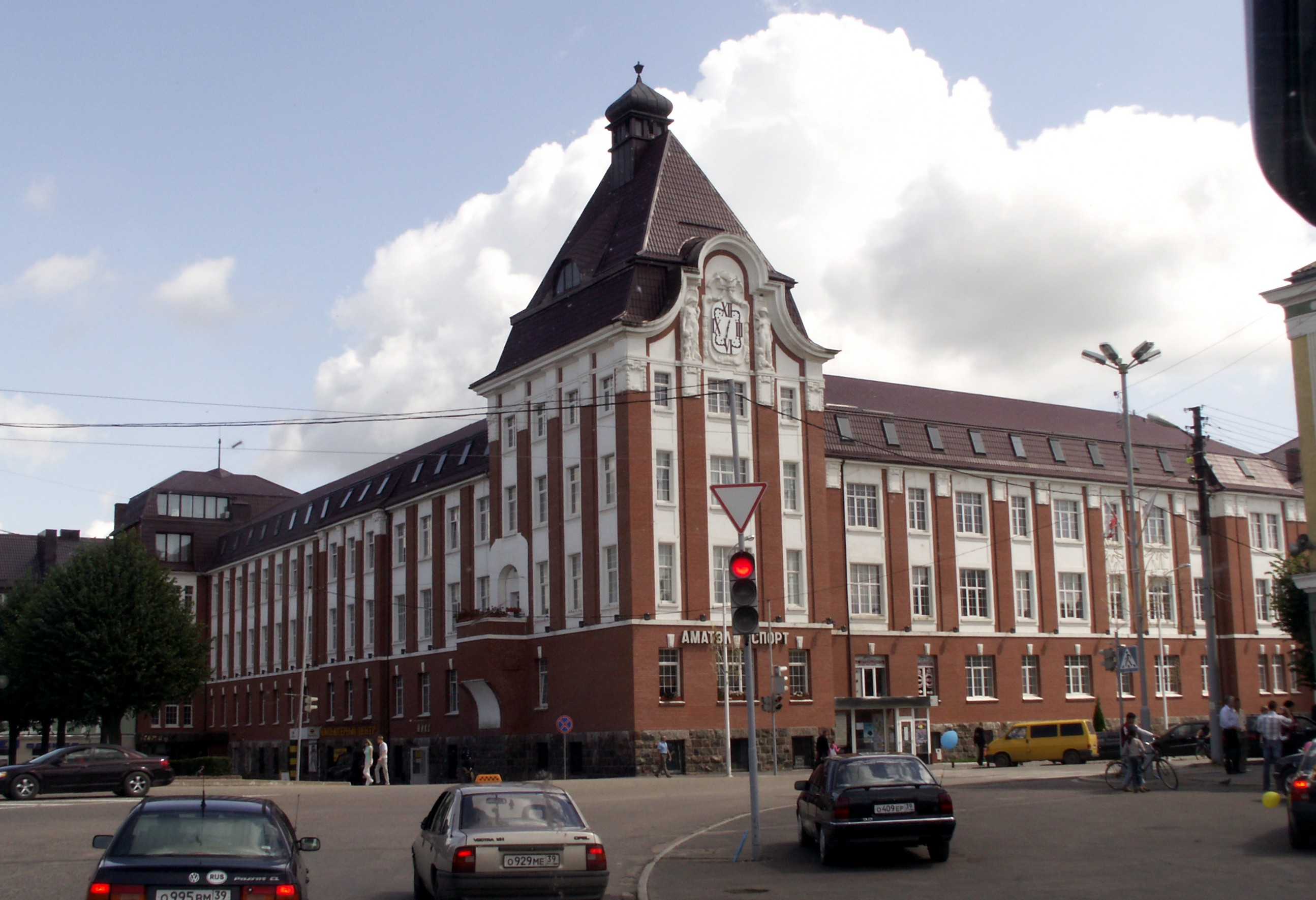
- Gusev, Gusevsky District

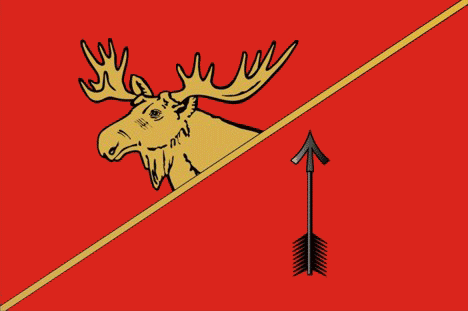
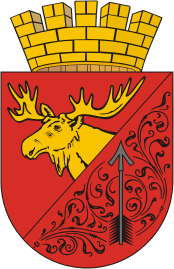
- Flag Coat of arms
- Location of Gusevsky District in Kaliningrad Oblast
- Coordinates: 54°35′N 22°12′E
- Country: Russia
- Federal subject: Kaliningrad Oblast
- Established: 1946
- Administrative center: Gusev

Area
  - Total: 654.9 km^{2} (252.9 sq mi)

Population (2010 Census)
  - Total: 37,142
  - Density: 56.71/km^{2} (146.9/sq mi)
  - Urban: 76.1%
  - Rural: 23.9%

Administrative structure
  - Administrative divisions: 1 Towns of district significance, 4 Rural okrugs
  - Inhabited localities: 1 cities/towns, 40 rural localities

Municipal structure
  - Municipally incorporated as: Gusevsky Urban Okrug
- Time zone: UTC+2 (MSK–1)
- OKTMO ID: 27709000
- Website: http://www.admgusev.ru/

Gusevsky District (Russian: Гу́севский райо́н) is an administrative district (raion), one of the fifteen in Kaliningrad Oblast, Russia. As a municipal division, it is incorporated as Gusevsky Urban Okrug. It is located in the east of the oblast. The area of the district is 654.9 square kilometers (252.9 sq mi). Its administrative center is the town of Gusev. Population: 37,142 (2010 census); 37,461 (2002 Census); 37,533 (1989 Soviet census). The population of Gusev accounts for 76.1% of the district's total population.

== Geography ==
The district is situated in the east of the oblast and is sparsely populated. The rivers in the district include the Pissa and the Angrapa. The southern parts of the district are dominated by forests; in the northern parts forests and steppe pasture prevail.

== Administrative and municipal status ==
Within the framework of administrative divisions, Gusevsky District is one of the fifteen in the oblast. The town of Gusev serves as its administrative center.

As a municipal division, the district has been incorporated as Gusevsky Urban Okrug since June 10, 2013. Prior to that date, the district was incorporated as Gusevsky Municipal District, which was subdivided into one urban settlement and four rural settlements.

== Economy ==
The economy is centered on agriculture. The main railway line and road from Kaliningrad to Moscow pass through the district.
