= Pillkaller =

Liquor from Dobrovolsk, Kaliningrad Oblast, Russia

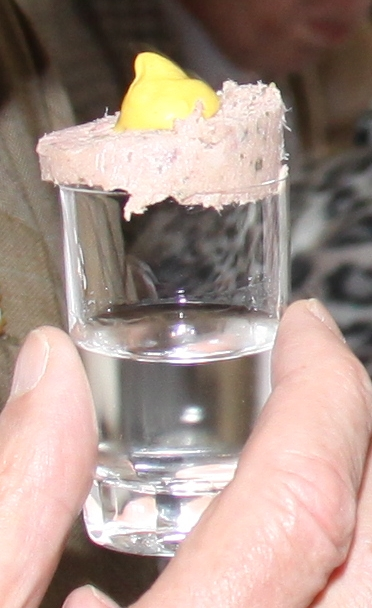
Pillkaller

Pillkaller Machandel or Pillkaller is a well-known liquor from Dobrovolsk, Kaliningrad Oblast, Russia. The name comes from the former name of the village Pillkallen. The drink is made using corn brandy/schnapps, liver sausage and mustard.

The drink was once made in Tapiau, now in Ahausen as Pillkaller Edel- Machandel and is still served as an Apéritif in East Prussian cuisine.

There are different types of consumption, such as eating a slice of spicy liver sausage topped with mustard and then immediately "washing it down" with the double grain. Another way is to put the liver sausage with mustard in the glass and pour the spirit over it. Then drink the drink in one sip and eat the liver sausage at the same time.
