= Polessk (air base) =

Polessk Labiau
- Polessk, Kaliningrad Oblast in Russia

Site information
- Type: Air Base
- Owner: Ministry of Defence
- Operator: Soviet Air Forces

Location
- Shown within Kaliningrad Oblast Polessk (Russia)
- Coordinates: 54°50′15″N 21°07′13″E

Site history
- Built: 1945
- In use: 1945 - 1970

Airfield information
- Identifiers: ICAO: ZD6S
- Elevation: 5 metres (16 ft) AMSL
Runways
Direction	Length and surface
08/26	2,000 metres (6,562 ft) Metall plate

Polessk is a former airbase of the Soviet Air Forces located near Polessk, Kaliningrad Oblast, Russia.

The base was home to the:

- 335th Assault Aviation Division between 1945 and 1946
- 60th Fighter Aviation Division between 1957 and 1960
  - 211th Fighter Aviation Regiment between 1957 and 1960 with the Mikoyan-Gurevich MiG-17 (ASCC: Fresco)
  - 938th Fighter Aviation Regiment between 1957 and 1960 with the MiG-17
  - 939th Fighter Aviation Regiment between 1957 and 1960 with the MiG-17
