= Deyma =

River in Kaliningrad Oblast, Russia

Coordinates: 54°53′37″N 21°05′22″E

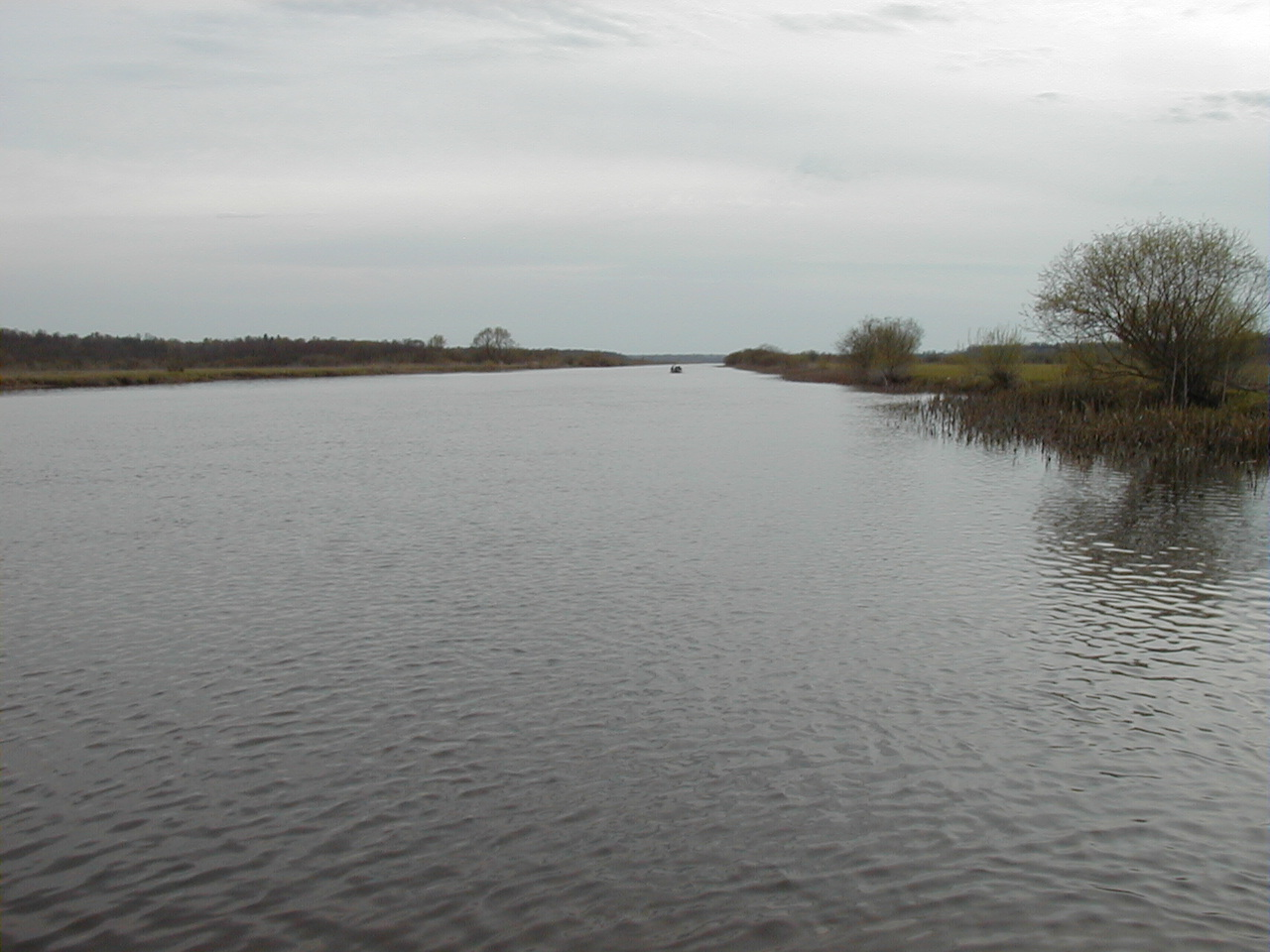
Deyma

The Deyma (Russian: Дейма; German: Deime; Lithuanian: Deimena) is a river in Russia's Kaliningrad Oblast. It separates from the Pregolya at Gvardeysk, flows through Polessk, and ends at the Curonian Lagoon. The Polessk Canal connects the Deima with the Nemunas.
