= Polessk =

Town in Kaliningrad Oblast, Russia

Polessk Полесск
- Town
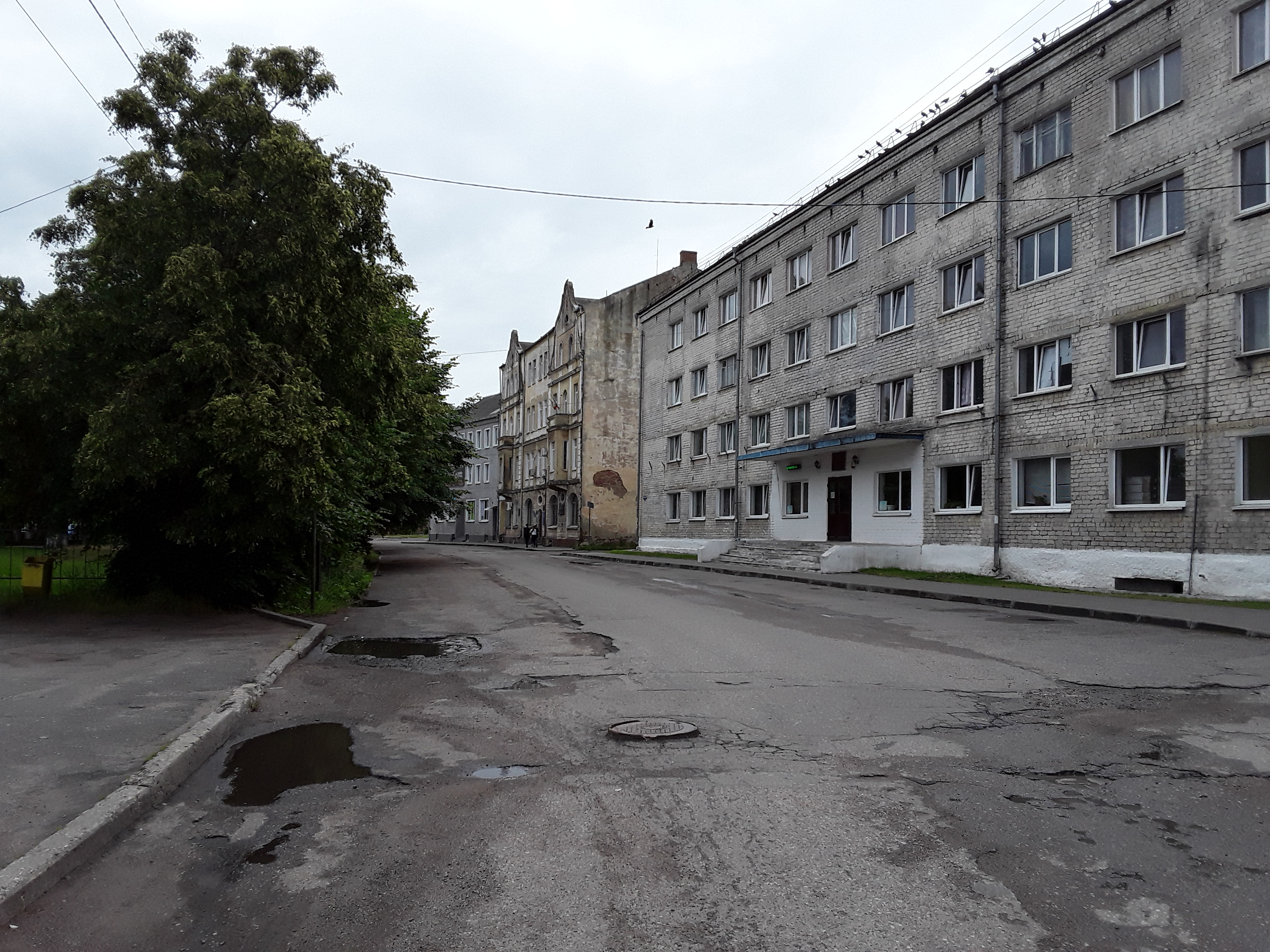

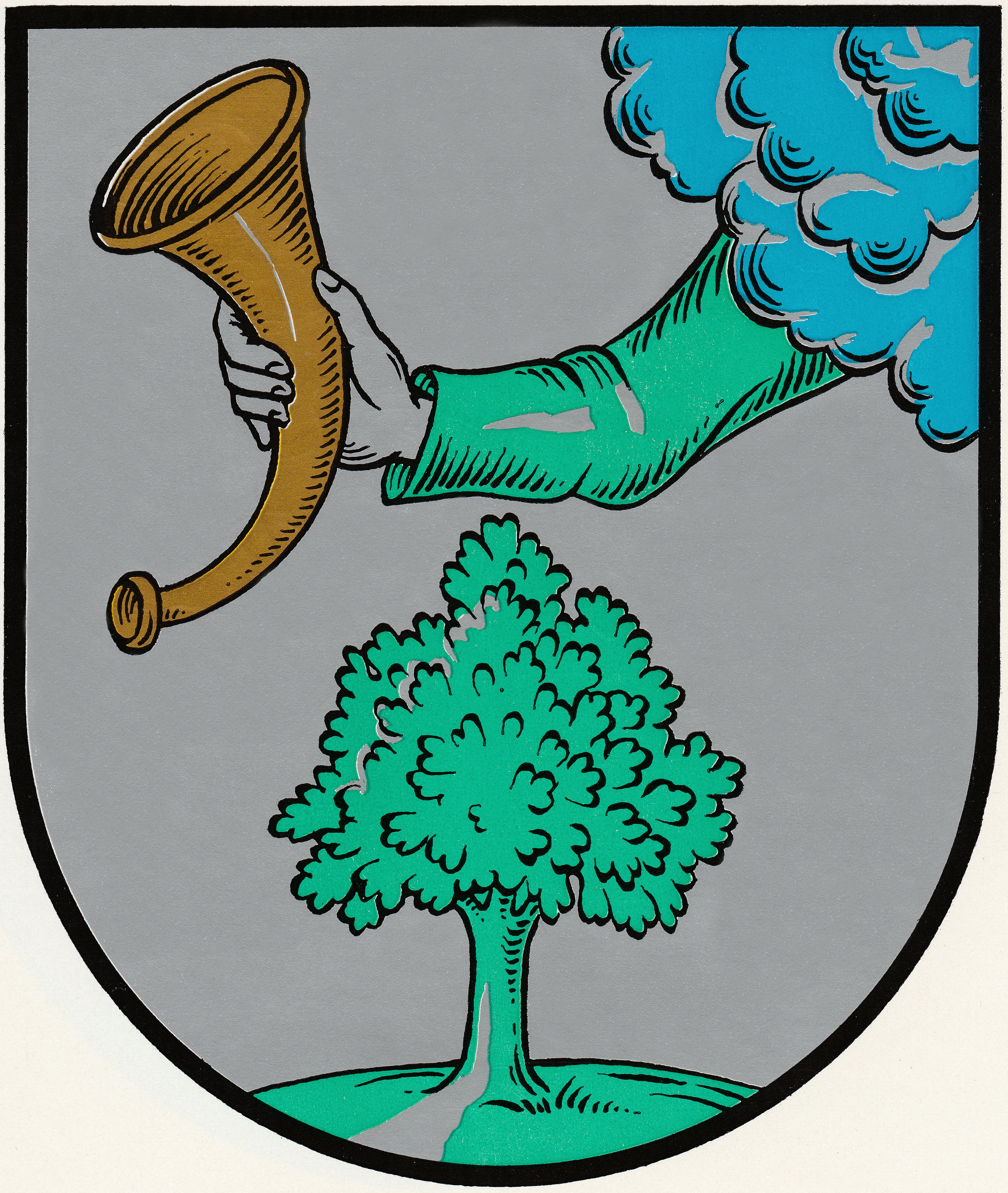
- Coat of arms
- Interactive map of Polessk
- Location of Polessk Polessk (European Russia) Polessk (Europe)
- Coordinates: 54°52′N 21°06′E
- Country: Russia
- Federal subject: Kaliningrad Oblast
- Administrative district: Polessky District
- Town of district significanceSelsoviet: Polessk
- Founded: 13th century
- Elevation: 3 m (9.8 ft)

Population (2010 Census)
  - Total: 7,581
  - Estimate (2023): 6,954 (−8.3%)

Administrative status
  - Capital of: Polessky District, town of district significance of Polessk

Municipal status
  - Municipal district: Polessky Municipal District
  - Urban settlement: Polesskoye Urban Settlement
  - Capital of: Polessky Municipal District, Polesskoye Urban Settlement
- Time zone: UTC+2 (MSK–1)
- Postal code: 238630
- OKTMO ID: 27718000001

Polessk (Russian: Полесск; German: Labiau; Lithuanian: Labguva; Polish: Labiawa) is a town and the administrative center of Polessky District in Kaliningrad Oblast, Russia, located 49 kilometers (30 mi) northeast of Kaliningrad, the administrative center of the oblast, at the junction of a main road and a railroad at the Deyma River, shortly before it enters the Curonian Lagoon. Population figures: 7,581 (2010 census); 7,681 (2002 census); 6,859 (1989 Soviet census); 4,744 (1885).

== Geography ==
The Polessk Canal begins in the town.

== History ==
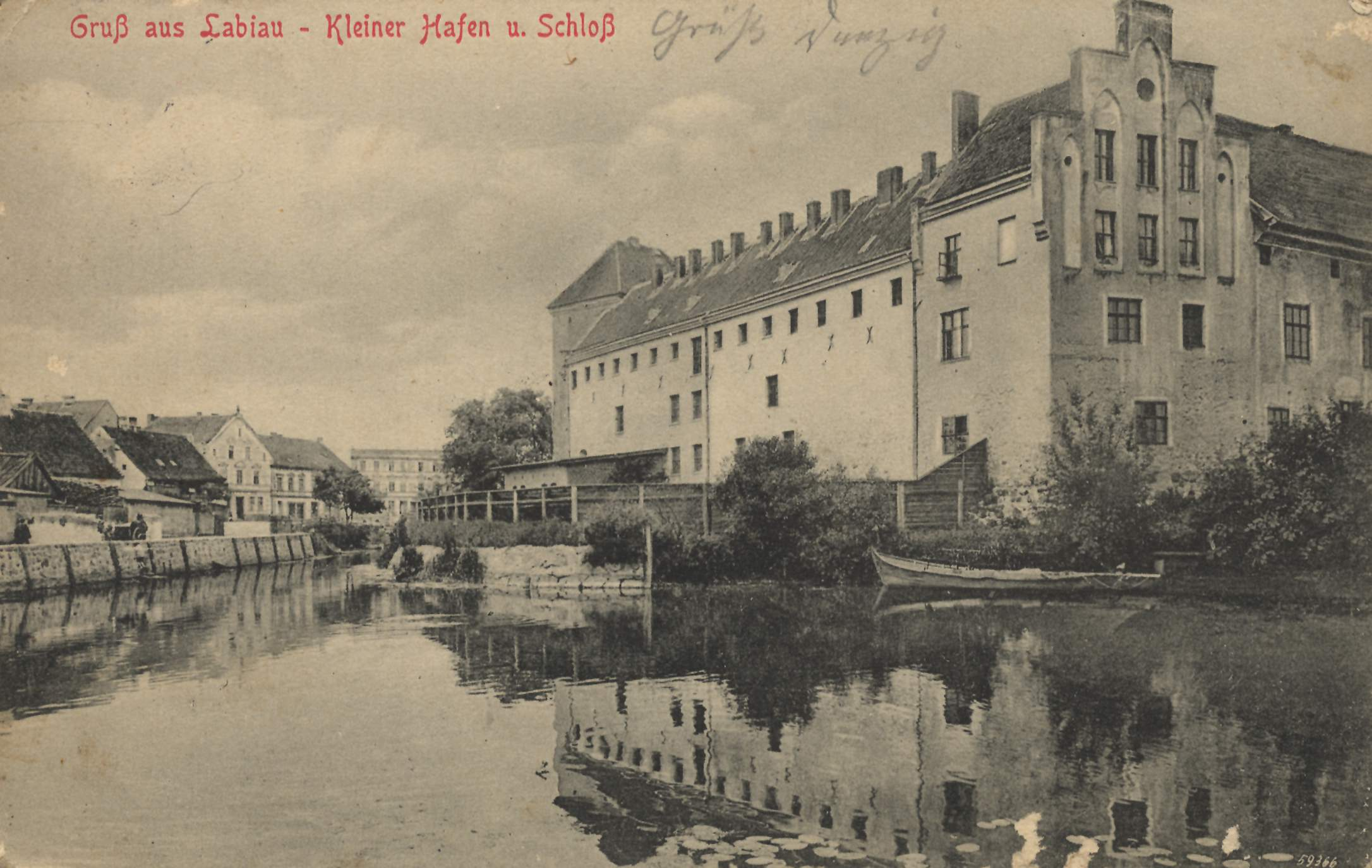
Labiau Castle in 1915

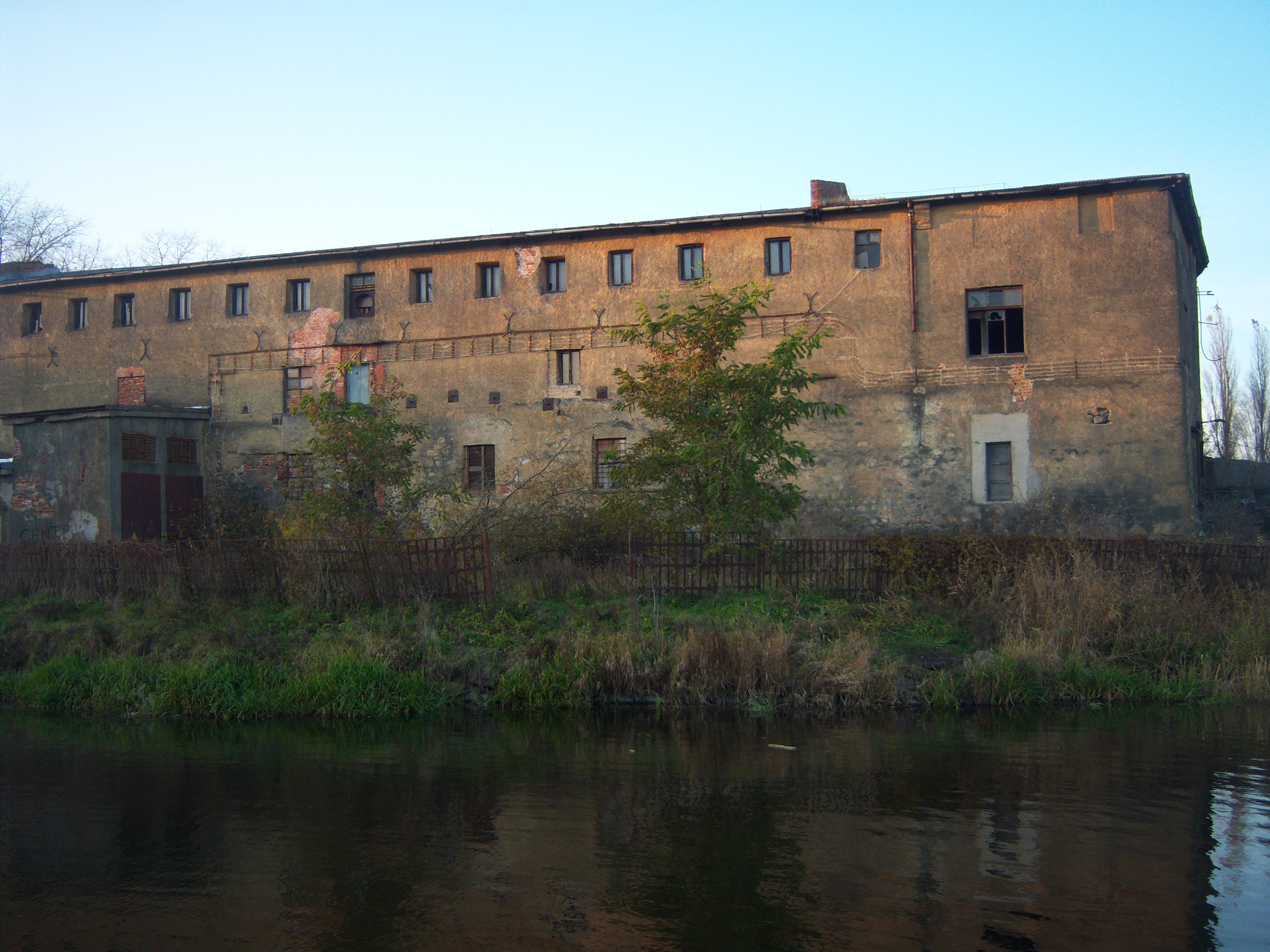
Labiau Castle in 2011

It was founded in the 13th century, by the Teutonic Order who erected a castle there and named it Labiau. Initially it was part of the State of the Teutonic Order. In 1454, King Casimir IV Jagiellon incorporated the region to the Kingdom of Poland upon the request of the anti-Teutonic Prussian Confederation. After the subsequent Thirteen Years' War (1454–1466) the settlement became a part of Poland as a fief held by the Teutonic Knights until 1525 and by Ducal Prussia afterwards. In this town, on November 20, 1656, was signed the Treaty of Labiau. Lithuanian church services were held at the local church. From the 18th century, it was part of the Kingdom of Prussia, and from 1871 it was also part of Germany, within which it was administratively located in the province of East Prussia. Labiau was a district seat in the administrative region of Königsberg. In 1885, Labiau had 4,744 inhabitants, almost all of whom were Lutherans.

Labiau was overrun by the Soviet Red Army in 1945 near the end of World War II. After Germany's defeat in the war in 1945, the town was transferred to Soviet Russia and the following year it was renamed Polessk. The German inhabitants were partly evacuated via the coast, or were subsequently expelled in accordance with the Potsdam Agreement and replaced with Soviet citizens.

The former Polessk (air base) is nearby.

== Administrative and municipal status ==
Within the framework of administrative divisions, Polessk serves as the administrative center of Polessky District. As an administrative division, it is, together with two rural localities, incorporated within Polessky District as the town of district significance of Polessk. As a municipal division, the town of district significance of Polessk is incorporated within Polessky Municipal District as Polesskoye Urban Settlement.

== Notable people ==
- Otto Brakat (1916–1978) Wehrmacht soldier
- Hans von Lehwaldt (1685-1768), Prussian field marshal
