= Gvardeysk =

Town in Kaliningrad Oblast, Russia

Gvardeysk Гвардейск
- Town
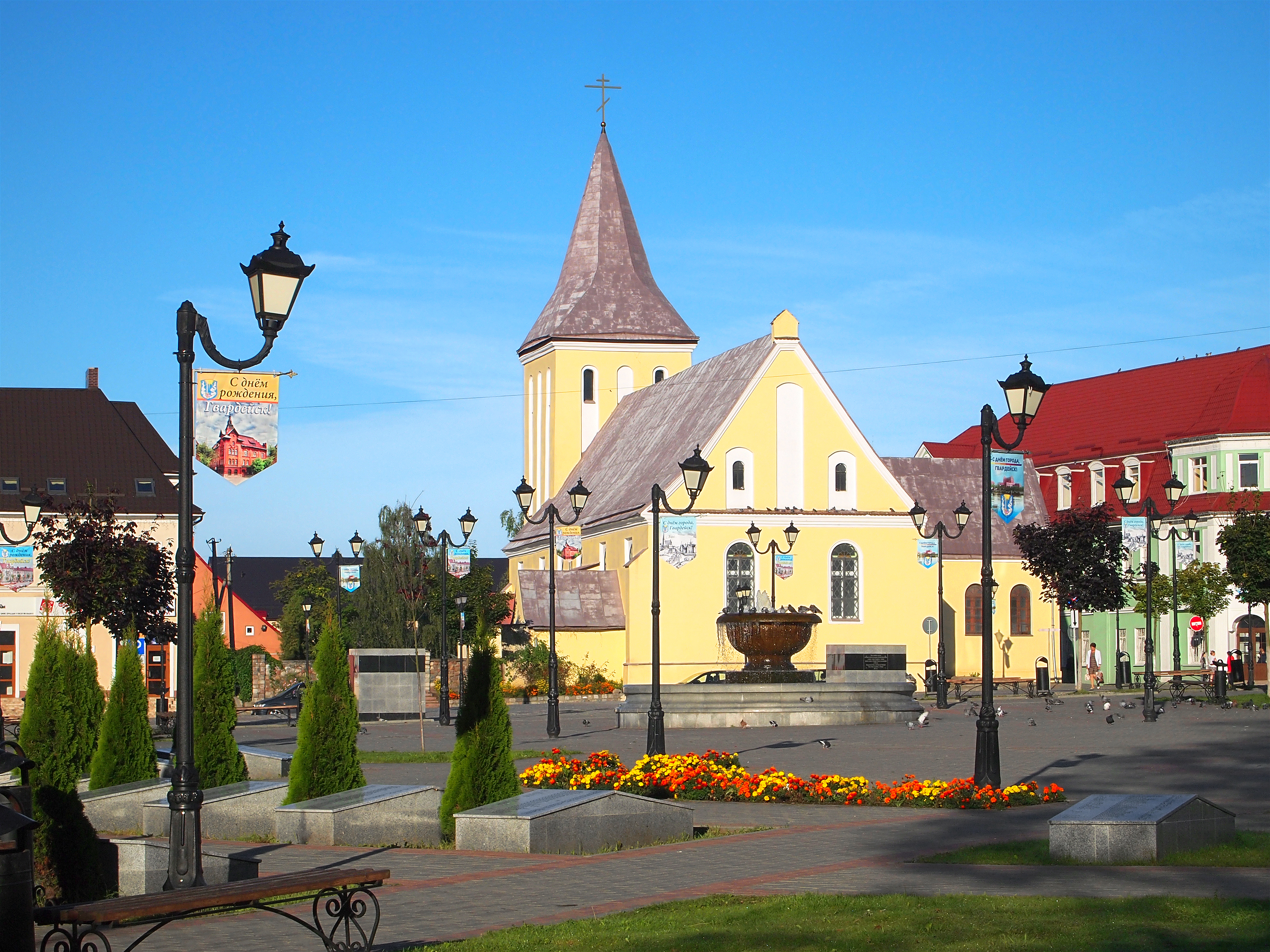
- Central square in Gvardeysk

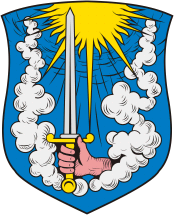
- Coat of arms
- Interactive map of Gvardeysk
- Location of Gvardeysk Gvardeysk (European Russia) Gvardeysk (Europe)
- Coordinates: 54°40′N 21°05′E
- Country: Russia
- Federal subject: Kaliningrad Oblast
- Administrative district: Gvardeysky District
- Town of district significanceSelsoviet: Gvardeysk
- First documented: 1254
- Town status since: 1722
- Elevation: 10 m (33 ft)

Population (2010 Census)
  - Total: 13,899
  - Estimate (2023): 13,962 (+0.5%)

Administrative status
  - Capital of: Gvardeysky District, town of district significance of Gvardeysk

Municipal status
  - Urban okrug: Gvardeysky Urban Okrug
  - Capital of: Gvardeysky Urban Okrug
- Time zone: UTC+2 (MSK–1)
- Postal code: 238210
- OKTMO ID: 27706000001
- Website: www.gvardeysk.org

Gvardeysk (Russian: Гвардейск, IPA: [ɡvɐrˈdʲejsk]; German: Tapiau ([ˈtaːpɪaʊ]); Polish: Tapiewo; historically Tapiawa; Lithuanian: Tepliava) is a town and the administrative center of Gvardeysky District in Kaliningrad Oblast, Russia, located on the right bank of the Pregolya River 38 kilometers (24 mi) east of Kaliningrad. Population figures: 13,353 (2021 census); 13,899 (2010 census); 14,572 (2002 census); 11,904 (1989 Soviet census). It is located within the historic region of Sambia.

== History ==
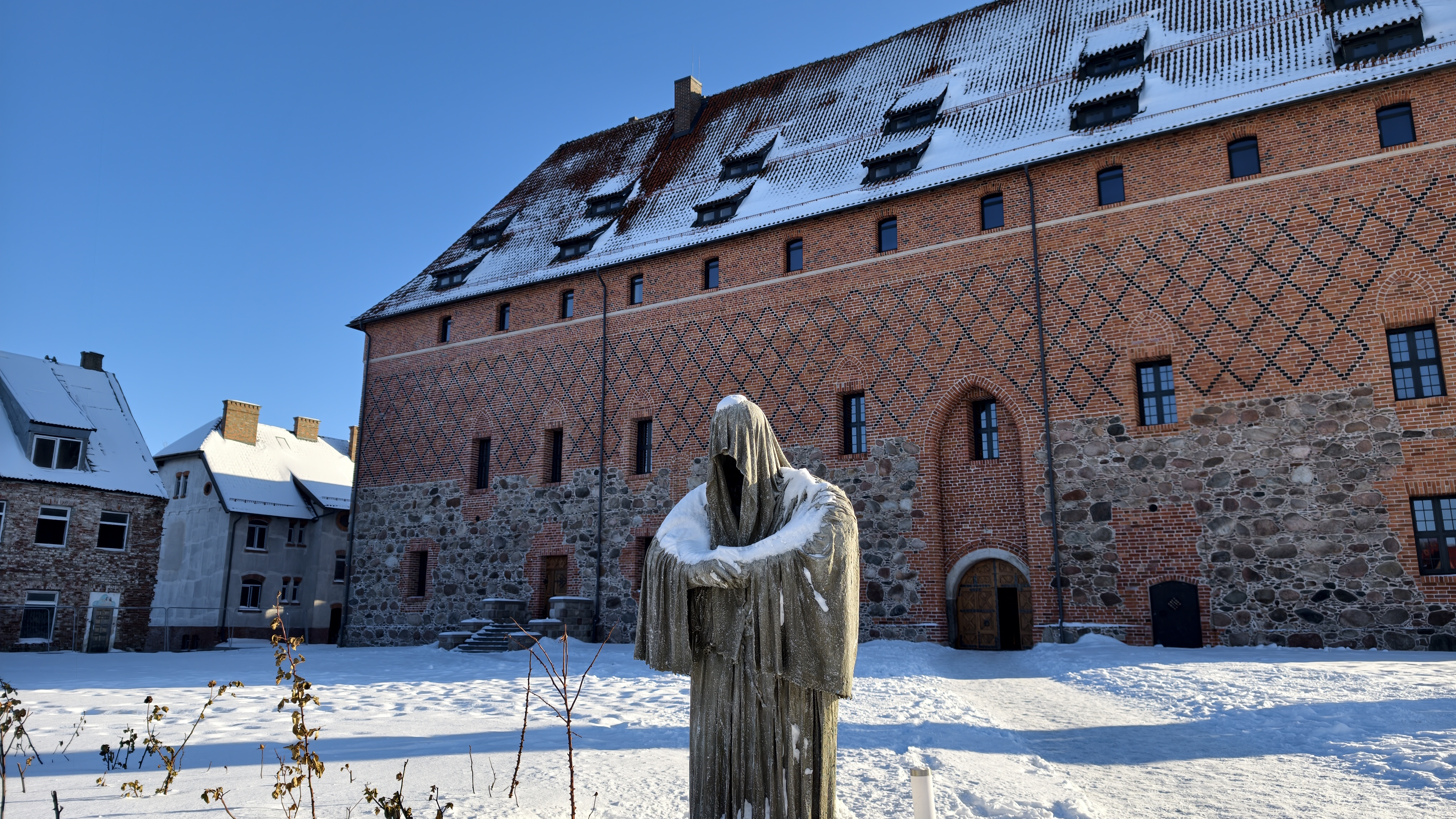
14th-century Teutonic Order Castle

Peter of Dusburg wrote of a settlement known as Tapiow, first documented in 1254, and the neighboring fort Surgurbi built by 1265. The Old Prussian names were derived from the words tape, teplu, toplu, tapi, meaning 'warm', and sur garbis, meaning 'around the mountain'. During the 13th century Prussian Crusade, the area was conquered by the Teutonic Knights. To protect Samland from the Nadruvians and Scalvians, the crusaders built a wooden fort between the Deime and Pregel Rivers in 1283–1290. This was replaced by Tapiau Castle, a stone Ordensburg, in 1351.

The settlement gradually became known by the German crusaders as Tapiau. Vytautas, the later Grand Duke of Lithuania, was baptized in Tapiau in 1385. After the transfer of the Grand Master's seat from Malbork to Königsberg, Tapiau became the site of the Order's archives and library from 1469 to 1722.

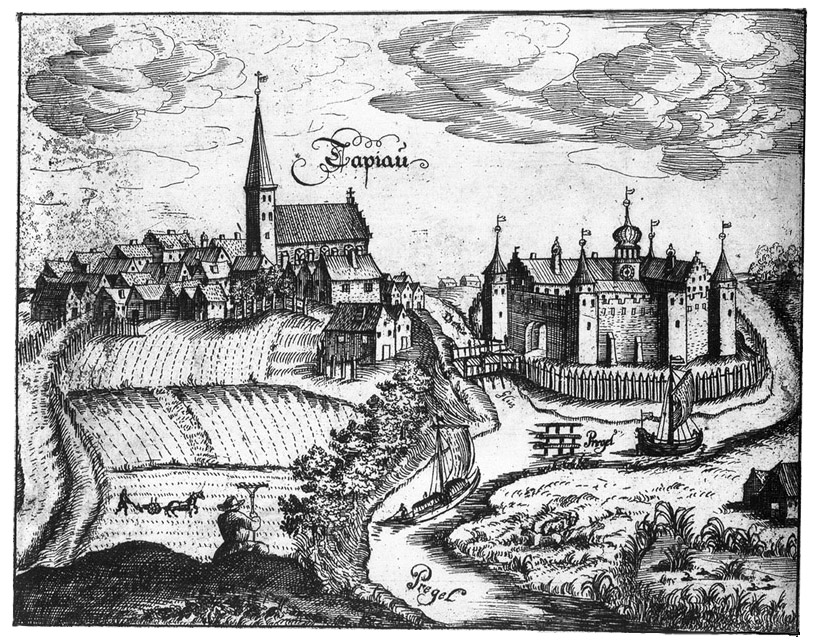
16th century depiction of Tapiau

Tapiau became a part of the Duchy of Prussia, a vassal state of Poland, in 1525. The Tapiau Castle was often used as a second residence of the Prussian dukes; Albert of Prussia died there in 1568. It became a part of the Kingdom of Prussia in 1701, receiving town privileges from King Frederick William I of Prussia in 1722. It became a part of the newly established Prussian Province of East Prussia in 1773 and was administered in Landkreis Wehlau (1818–1945). Tapiau became a part of the German Empire during the unification of Germany in 1871.

In August 1939, the Germans imprisoned the principal, teachers, other staff and 162 students of the Polish gymnasium in Kwidzyn in the town. They were held in the former psychiatric hospital. In September 1939, during the German invasion of Poland, which started World War II, it was converted into a prisoner-of-war camp for Polish POWs, and Polish teachers and youth were deported elsewhere. A Nazi prison for women was operated in the town.

Unlike most other towns in northern East Prussia, Tapiau was largely undamaged during World War II. Following the war's end in 1945, it was annexed by the Soviet Union and renamed Gvardeysk ('guard town') in 1946. The town's German population of more than 9,000 either fled or were killed during the war, and those remaining after the war were expelled and gradually replaced by Soviet residents.

== Administrative and municipal status ==
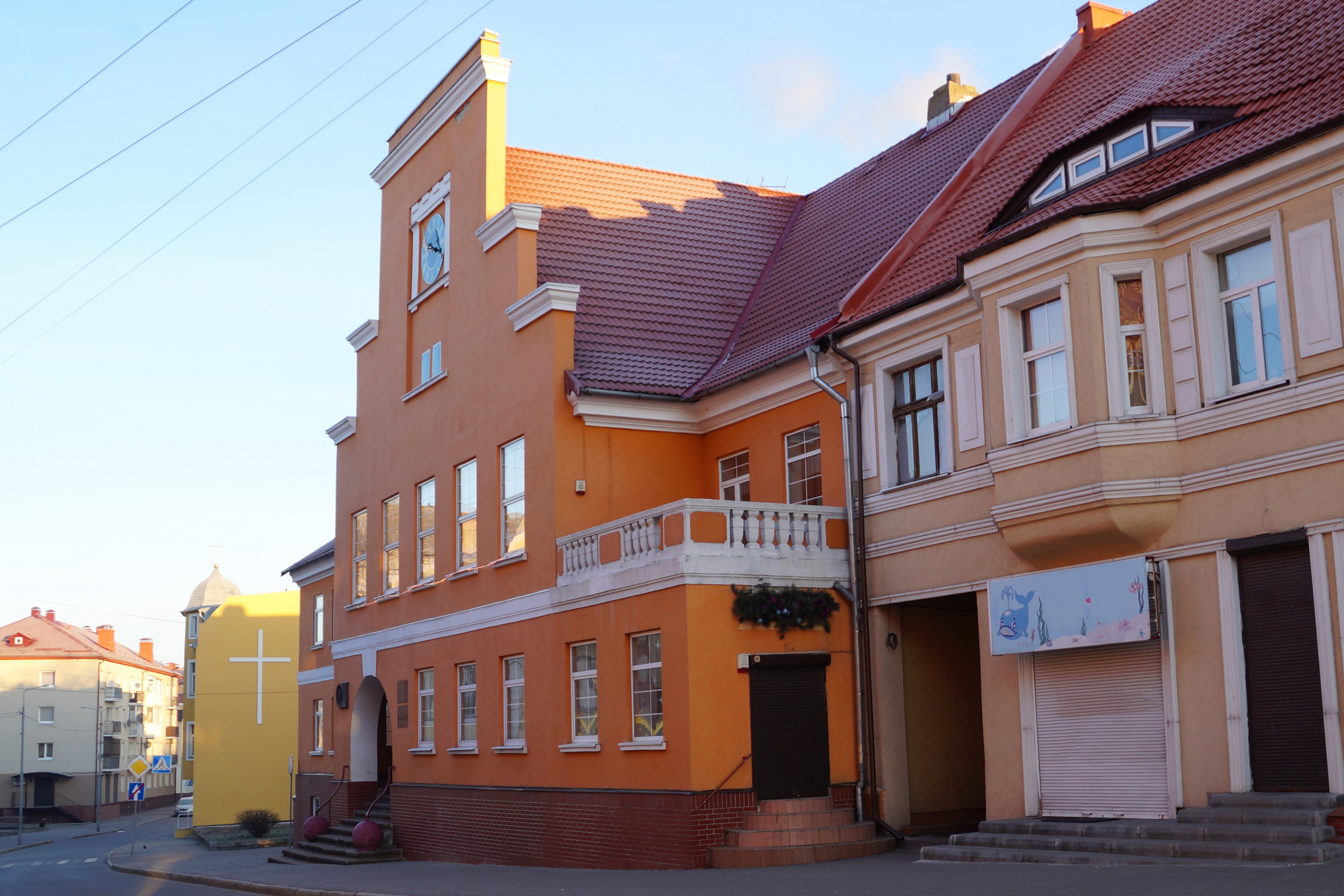
Old town hall

Within the framework of administrative divisions, Gvardeysk serves as the administrative center of Gvardeysky District. As an administrative division, it is, together with one rural locality (the settlement of Prigorodnoye), incorporated within Gvardeysky District as the town of district significance of Gvardeysk.

Within the framework of municipal divisions, since June 11, 2014, the territories of the town of district significance of Gvardeysk and of four rural okrugs of Gvardeysky District are incorporated as Gvardeysky Urban Okrug. Before that, the town of district significance was incorporated within Gvardeysky Municipal District as Gvardeyskoye Urban Settlement.

== Coat of arms ==
The coat of arms of Gvardeysk depicts a bare hand holding a sword amongst clouds, beneath a golden sun. When the town was known as Tapiau before 1946, the golden sun also included the Tetragrammaton (Jehova-Sonne).

== Sights ==
Sights of Gvardeysk include a church from 1502 and the ruined Tapiau Castle, reconstructed into an orphanage in 1879. It has been used as a prison since 1945.

== People ==
Tapiau's most famous resident was the German Impressionist painter Lovis Corinth (1858–1925), who donated the painting Golgatha for the altar of the town's church in 1910; the painting disappeared near the end of World War II. The house where Corinth was born still stands in Gvardeysk. Other notable people associated with the town include Albert, Duke of Prussia (1490–1568), who died in Tapiau.
