= Germanisation of Prussia =

The intermittent Germanisation of Prussia was a historical process that resulted in the region’s inclusion in various German states. Originating with the arrival of ethnically German groups in the Baltic region, it progressed sporadically with the development of the Teutonic Order and then much later under the Kingdom of Prussia, which continued to impact the region with germanising policies generally aimed at enhancing state control. Ultimately, attempts at Germanisation peaked as the Prussian state transitioned into the German Empire, which affected Germany's Lithuanian and Polish subjects, only to be halted by the outbreak of the First World War.

== Native inhabitants ==
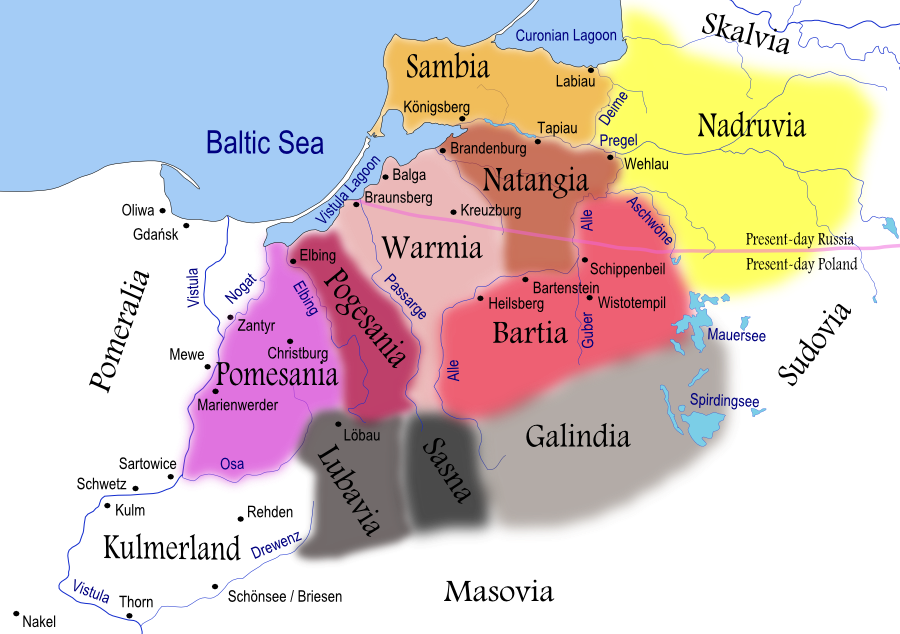
Map of native Prussian clans during the 13th century. The line in pink displays present-day borders.

Preceding Germanisation, numerous Prussian tribes inhabited Prussia, exhibiting pagan beliefs. Accordingly, religious as well as economic and political factors inspired eastward German expansion, in what was later regarded as the Drang nach Osten (push to the east). Whilst conquest was predominately violent and entailed large scale resettlement measures, there were cases of native nobles utilising the presence of foreigners in order to gain a local advantage, resembling to some extent a capacity for cooperation. However, the subjugation of native tribes did not ensure their immediate eradication, as natives otherwise retained their lifestyle, resulting in their gradual absorption into larger population sects over the following centuries. It is speculated that this preservation of local inhabitants' rights for so long can be attributed to their importance in fulfilling military functions for their new rulers. Conversely, the worth of Prussia and neighbouring territory has been questioned by some academics, thereby explaining the neglect of the broader Baltic region by its Christian neighbours until the 13th century. It is argued that in seeking to develop its trade networks with Russia, the Hanseatic League opened the Baltic to foreign interests. This assertion is supported by the absence of written sources pre-Christianity regionally, as well as archaeological analysis of maritime infrastructure indicating that any mercantile activity was limited.

== The Teutonic Order ==
=== Origins ===
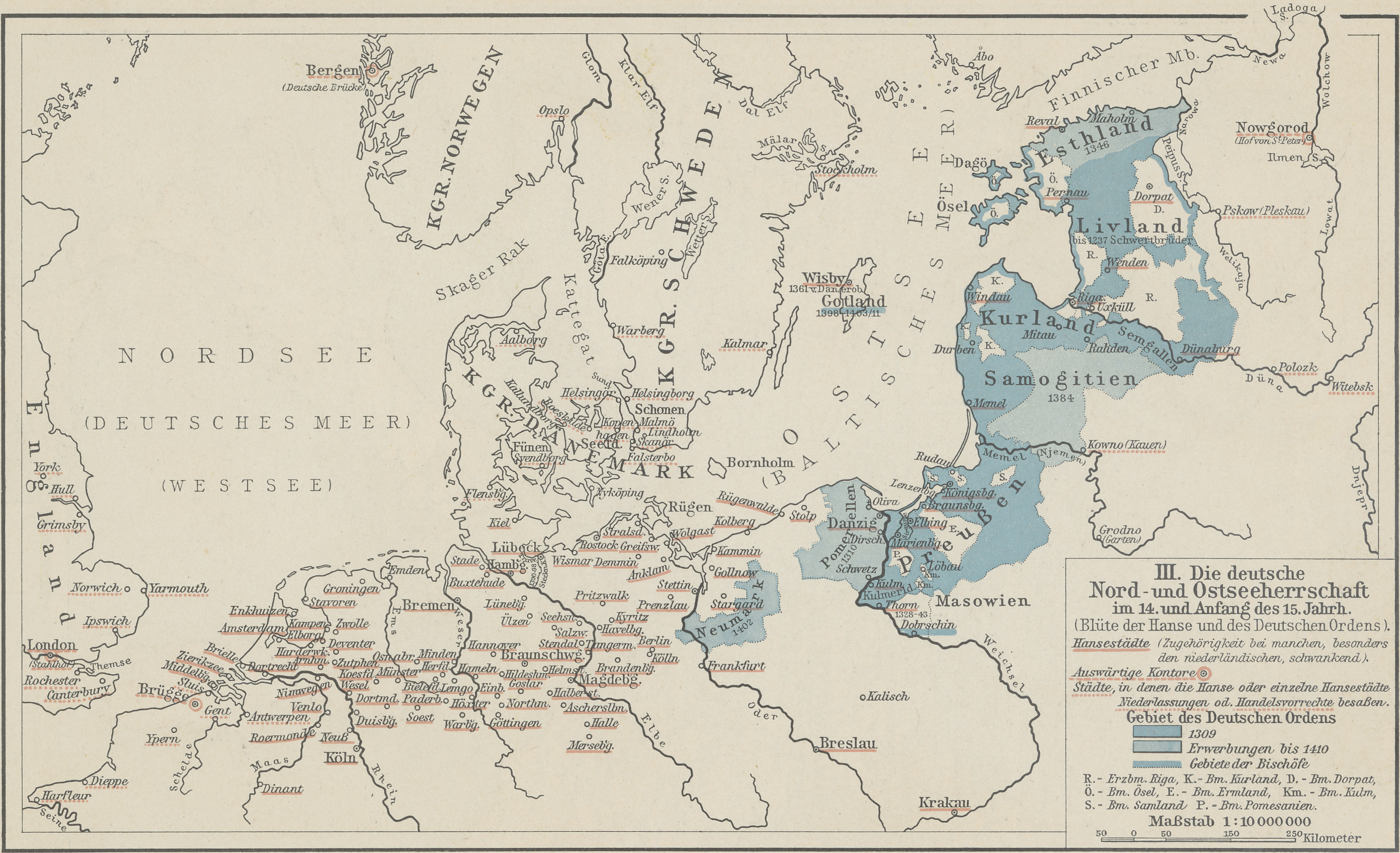
Map depicts the extent of the Teutonic Order (Ordensstaat) in blue and the Hanseatic League at their peak in the early 15th century. Overall, this displays the extent of German influence beyond traditional ethnic borders. Cities underlined in red are members of the Hanseatic League's trade network.

From the early 13th century the establishment of trade settlements in the Baltic began, advancing the economic interests of a powerful German, mercantile, ruling-class. Consequently, this settlement coincided with growth of the Hanseatic League, particularly north of Prussia with the growth of the Brothers of the Sword Order. This established a definitively German presence in the region, allowing for future expansion, contemporarily promoted as crusading. This was especially the case for Prussia, which scholars have contrasted to other incursions such as those into Livonia and Lithuania as the best example of conventional crusading, with religious justifications remaining central rather than political or economic motivations taking precedence.

Following their defeat in Lithuania at the Battle of Saule in 1236, the Sword Brothers, who had previously seen success in conquering Livonia and eventually Estonia (with the help of the Danes), amalgamated with the Knights of the Cross. Thus began the Teutonic Order, which retained the territory the Knights of the Cross had garnered in Prussia. Aside from ensuring a long-term German presence in Prussia, these developments did little more to rapidly alter the religious or ethnic composition of the region, due to the aforementioned concerns of Teutonic leadership with the compliant mobilisation of its subjects for military functions. Nonetheless, the inclusion of civilising measures taken by the Teutonic Order by past academics does imply some degree of Germanisation. As a consequence, the Teutonic Order's contributions include productive agrarian reforms and infrastructure construction: namely towns, roads and canals. Once again, the implementation of a feudal hierarchy and the civic notion of conscription duties are central to the Order's impact on Prussia, although whether this constitutes Germanisation is implicitly contentious.

=== Decline ===
Ultimately, the Teutonic Order did not survive as a dominant force in the region, with their decline markedly accelerating with their defeat at the Battle of Tannenberg. Increasingly pressured by their Polish neighbours with the theatres of continual conflict shifting away from neighbouring lands to within their domain, the financial burden on the Order's subjects was especially taxing. As a consequence, opposition to the Order had begun with the establishment of the Lizard League in 1397, a group which notably retained a Polish element in its allegiances. Similarly, the emergent Prussian Union (Preußischer Bund), composed of various dissatisfied local estates, later grew to oppose Teutonic rule. Over the course of 1454 the Union not only withdrew from the rule of the Order but allied themselves with the Poland, offering themselves as subjects. In doing so, the Thirteen Years' War began, resulting in the Teutonic Order's defeat. Thus, Prussia was partitioned, with the western portion being reclaimed by the Polish crown and the east remaining a largely autonomous fief. Yet, as a result, this minor state was forced to abide by Polish laws alongside their own, with local institutions enduring.

== Kingdom of Prussia ==
=== Formation and reclamation of Teutonic territory ===
The possessions of the Brandenburg-Prussia personal union at its inception in 1618 (red). The Prussian territories are visibly located outside the Holy Roman Empire.

Having formally crowned himself King in Prussia, Frederick III (then Frederick I of Prussia) cemented the unification of the remaining secularised possessions of the Teutonic Order with the Duchy of Brandenburg in 1701, ending Brandenburg-Prussia. Frederick I's father, Frederick William the Great Elector, had been previously granted full sovereignty over Ducal Prussia, the eastern portion of Prussia, for his eventual support of Poland in the Second Northern War. The 'in' rather than 'of' in 'King in Prussia' was stipulated so as to reconcile a desire for greater political clout with the appeasement of the Polish crown by not directly threatening its titles.

This re-iterated geographical concerns associated with the separation of Prussian possessions, which Frederick the Great, the grandson of Frederick I, sought to remedy. By 1772, Frederick the Great had acquired the vast majority of West Prussia from Poland through a diplomatic fait accompli, backed by Russia and Austria in what was the First Partition of Poland. Thus, Frederick restored much of the Teutonic Order's former territory to Germanic ownership, bar the cities of Danzig and Thorn which remained for a short while longer in Poland's possession. Moreover, this united the region of Prussia with the remainder of the Kingdom as predominately a singular landmass.

=== Policies ===
Under Frederick the Great's father, Frederick William I of Prussia, any historical records linking Prussia to the Polish crown were erased, so as to assert the region's independence and justify the continuance of The Prussian Kingdom.

Importantly, Frederick the Great considered the Polish to be an inferior people, underscoring the resumption of Germanisation policies, albeit with greater vigour than previous historical occurrences. Altogether, his reforms were numerous and formative in encouraging efficient integration, with every fifth Prussian being involved in the mass resettlement across Prussia at the time of his death.

On top of this, the resumption in the flow of German settlers to the region entailed the implementation of numerous reforms also aimed at germanising Prussia's new subjects. Of these, serfdom was effectively abolished as it was under Polish standards, through being modified to meet Prussian standards. This was also the case for the replacement of previously existing legal and bureaucratic systems in West Prussia. Finally, following partition, large-scale educational expansion occurred, with approximately 750 schools having been constructed, comprehensively improving education in areas previously left untouched. Importantly, this expansion did include a preference for teachers competent in Polish, as well as German, which experts identify as indicative of the extent to which Germanisation was comparatively soft-handed at this stage. Later, following an uprising catalysed by the partitions of Poland, the Prussian bureaucracy responded with confiscations of local nobles' property.

== Bismarckian Era ==
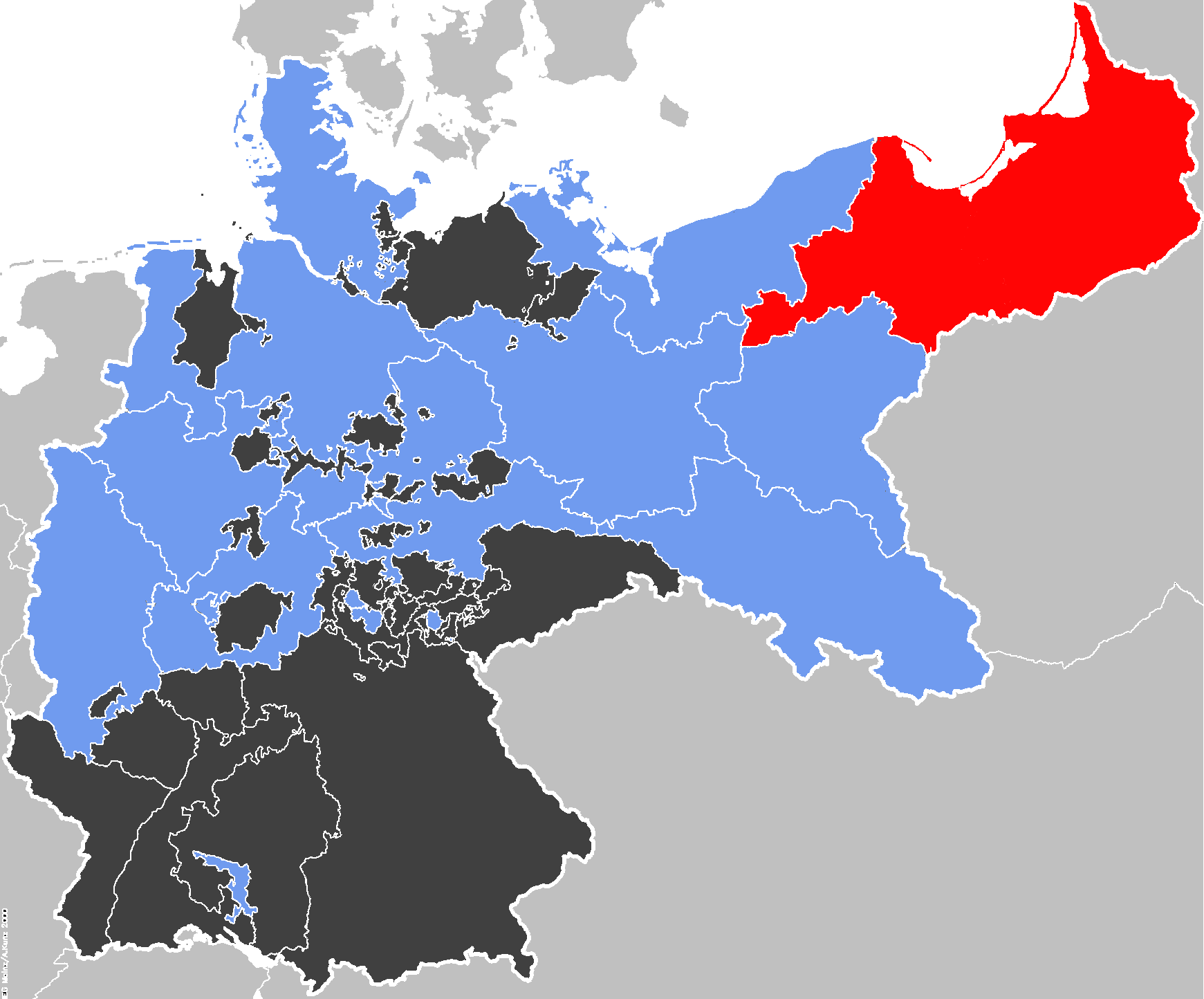
West and East Prussia (red) within the Kingdom of Prussia (blue). Combined with the states in Black they formed the German Empire.

While policy norms established by Frederick the Great focused upon tolerance, regarding Poles as inferior but still respecting their cultural differences, the policy shift under Otto von Bismarck following the unification of Germany was significant. Correspondingly, a determination to eradicate non-German cultural aspects exhibited themselves again amongst the Prussian region, targeting particularly education and land ownership. Moreover, the targeting and disempowerment of the Polish and other minorities was also driven by martial interests, due to the strategic proximity of Polish populations to the capital in Berlin. Here, the security interests of the military additionally saw Polish soldiers diffused throughout the German army, so as to prevent a concentration of Polish soldiers at a regimental level.

Especially in the aftermath of Germany's formation, education in schools became a major tool in government efforts to unify various ethnic groups, albeit primarily Germanic ones, residing within the newly created state. As such, the intensification of Germanisation policies pertaining to education saw stringent restrictions on the speaking of Polish as well as its education in schools. Although, policies across this period were, at times, subject to adjustment. The appointment of different chancellors, such as Leo von Caprivi, brought with it the possibility of policy change. Caprivi particularly sought to moderate the oppressive measures of his predecessors through the provision of religious exemptions from Polish language restrictions, as well as offering voluntary Polish language education. However, such reforms were met with opposition from groups such as the Pan-German League and the Eastern Marches Association, forcing Caprivi's eventual resignation. By 1900, religious teaching had reverted to once again being taught solely in German. Accordingly, strikes ensued as in 1906–07 Polish students in Western Prussia sought to defend their language and culture, garnering international attention. In response to protests and objections from the imposed curriculum, corporal punishment and detention were utilised, with resistance to these germanising policies framed under various criminal charges.

In 1885, the state government of Prussia specifically pursued increased land possession, when 30,000 Poles, as well as Jews, were expelled based on their retention of solely either Russian or Austrian citizenship. The following year, the Prussian Settlement Commission was formed by the Bismarck government, with the hope of reinvigorating German settlement, particularly in the countryside, at the expense of the Polish. By 1908, this sentiment had progressed to the point where the Commission could confiscate Polish estates under an Expropriation Law. Whilst academics have noted the severity of this policy agenda shift, in numerical terms the success of its outcomes are less emphatic. Although, there is consensus among experts as to the high extent to which these policies stoked nationalism in Prussia's Polish citizens' collective conscience, encouraging their continued resistance to assimilation. For instance, newspapers such as the Torun Gazette (Gazeta Toruńska) specifically opposed the Germanisation of Polish-speaking provinces, contributing to the cultural resistance of the Polish. Overall, opposition to German rule was successful as in the wake of the First World War, Poland was restored to Europe as an independent nation at Germany's territorial expense, with the separation of East Prussia from the remainder of Germany.
