= Krasnoznamensk, Kaliningrad Oblast =

Town in Kaliningrad Oblast, Russia

Krasnoznamensk Краснознаменск
- Town
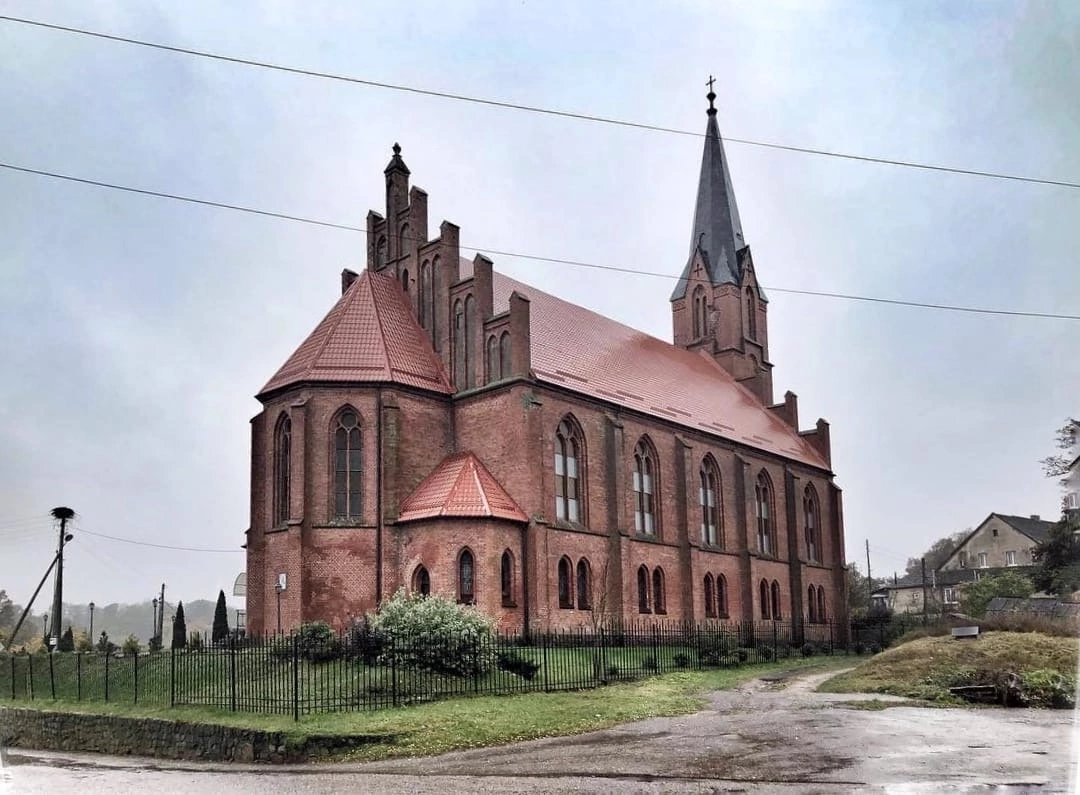
- Saints Peter and Paul church

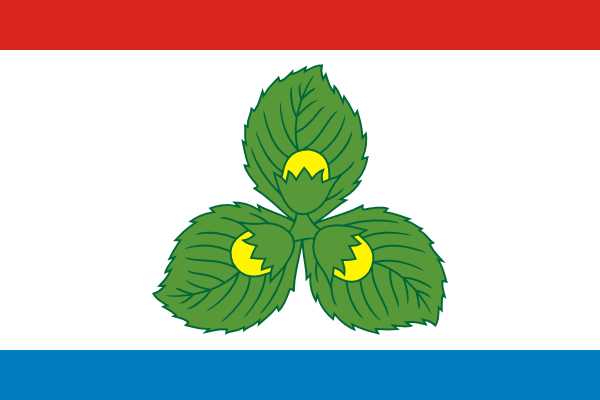
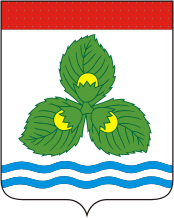
- Flag Coat of arms
- Interactive map of Krasnoznamensk
- Location of Krasnoznamensk Krasnoznamensk (European Russia) Krasnoznamensk (Russia)
- Coordinates: 54°56′32″N 22°29′23″E
- Country: Russia
- Federal subject: Kaliningrad Oblast
- Administrative district: Krasnoznamensky District
- Town of district significanceSelsoviet: Krasnoznamensk
- Founded: 1734
- Elevation: 30 m (98 ft)

Population (2010 Census)
  - Total: 3,522
  - Estimate (2023): 3,374 (−4.2%)

Administrative status
  - Capital of: Krasnoznamensky District, town of district significance of Krasnoznamensk

Municipal status
  - Urban okrug: Krasnoznamensky Urban Okrug
  - Capital of: Krasnoznamensky Urban Okrug
- Time zone: UTC+2 (MSK–1)
- Postal code: 238730
- OKTMO ID: 27513000001

Krasnoznamensk (Russian: Краснозна́менск, lit. Red Banner Town; German: Lasdehnen (1734–1938), Haselberg (1938–1946); Lithuanian: Lazdynai; Polish: Lasdeny) is a town and the administrative center of Krasnoznamensky District in Kaliningrad Oblast, Russia, located on the Šešupė River, 163 kilometers (101 mi) northeast of Kaliningrad, the administrative center of the oblast, and approximately 10 kilometers (6.2 mi) to the south of the border with Lithuania. It has a population of 3,522 (2010 census).

== History ==
The earliest surviving German language record of the settlement dates from 1521 under the name Haselpusch, meaning hazel bush in German, while Russian sources give the date of the earliest record as 1576 and other sources state that it was established in 1734. The village had a church by 1578, but it burned down in 1661 and the replacement building had to be taken down in 1869 due to severe structural defects. In 1584, a Lithuanian parish school was established. The town was part of the State of the Teutonic Order until 1525 and of Ducal Prussia afterwards.

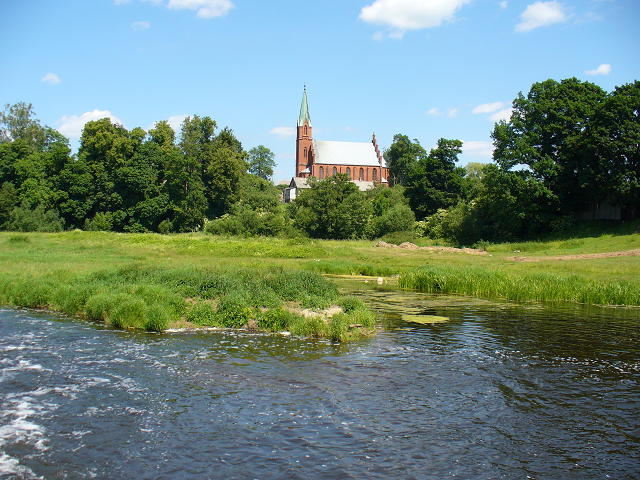
Church and Šešupė River

It belonged to the Kingdom of Prussia since 1701 and the German Empire since the unification of Germany in 1871, and was located in the province of East Prussia. In the early 18th century the town's name was changed to Lasdehnen, based on the Old Prussian language term for hazel bushes, and the current Gothic Revival church was built between 1874 and 1877. Four annual fairs were held in the town in the late 19th century. For centuries, the area was inhabited primarily by Lithuanians. As a result of Germanisation, the percentage of Lithuanians in the local Protestant parish fell, according to official Prussian statistics, from 57% in 1870 to 33% in 1907. Youth was prepared for confirmation in Lithuanian until 1890, and Lithuanian-language church services were held until 1938. Local printing houses still sold publications in Lithuanian in the interbellum. In 1938, during a massive Nazi campaign of renaming of placenames, it was Germanized to Haselberg (literally "hazel mountain") due to the Baltic origins of its prior name.

By 1945, during World War II, Haselberg's ethnic German population had largely fled before the advance of the Red Army in 18 January. Following the end of the war Haselberg was included in the portion of the former province of East Prussia annexed by the Soviet Union that was organized into Kaliningrad Oblast of the Russian SFSR. The historical regional capital of nearby Schloßberg (still commonly known by its pre-1938 name Pillkallen, now Dobrovolsk) had been severely damaged during the course the war, so Soviet authorities relocated Pillkallen's former administrative functions to Haselberg, which had suffered less damage. On 7 April 1946, the Soviets renamed the town as Krasnoznamensk, literally "Red Banner Town", and the following year became the administrative center of the new Krasnoznamensky District. The hazelnuts on the flag and the coat of the arms of the city keep the association with the historical name of the city.

== Administrative and municipal status ==
Within the framework of administrative divisions, Krasnoznamensk serves as the administrative center of Krasnoznamensky District. As an administrative division, it is, together with two rural localities, incorporated within Krasnoznamensky District as the "town of district significance of Krasnoznamensk".

Within the framework of municipal divisions, since May 5, 2015, the territories of the town of district significance of Krasnoznamensk and of three rural okrugs of Krasnoznamensky District are incorporated as Krasnoznamensky Urban Okrug. Before that, the town of district significance was incorporated within Krasnoznamensky Municipal District as "Krasnoznamenskoye Urban Settlement".

== Demographics ==
=== Population trends ===
Historical population

| Year | Pop. | ±% |
|---|---|---|
| 1885 | 1,294 | — |
| 1910 | 1,857 | +43.5% |
| 1933 | 2,065 | +11.2% |
| 1939 | 2,070 | +0.2% |
| 1959 | 2,843 | +37.3% |

| Year | Pop. | ±% |
|---|---|---|
| 1970 | 2,911 | +2.4% |
| 1979 | 3,392 | +16.5% |
| 1989 | 3,894 | +14.8% |
| 2002 | 3,751 | −3.7% |
| 2010 | 3,522 | −6.1% |

Source: (1979 Census) (1989 Soviet census) (2002 census) (2010 census)

=== Ethnic composition ===
According to the 2010 census: Russians - 87.4%, Lithuanians - 2.8%, Ukrainians - 2.5%, Belarusians - 2.5%, Roma - 1%, Armenians - 1%, Germans - 0.9%, Tatars - 0.6%, Poles - 0.5%, others - 0.8%

Krasnoznamensk is in the ethnographic region known as Lithuania Minor, and Lithuanian cultural organizations exist in the town.

Where religion is recorded from the census process, pre-1945 census data show the religious affiliation of the population as Prussian Evangelical.
