= Slavsk =

Town in Kaliningrad Oblast, Russia

Slavsk Славск
- Town
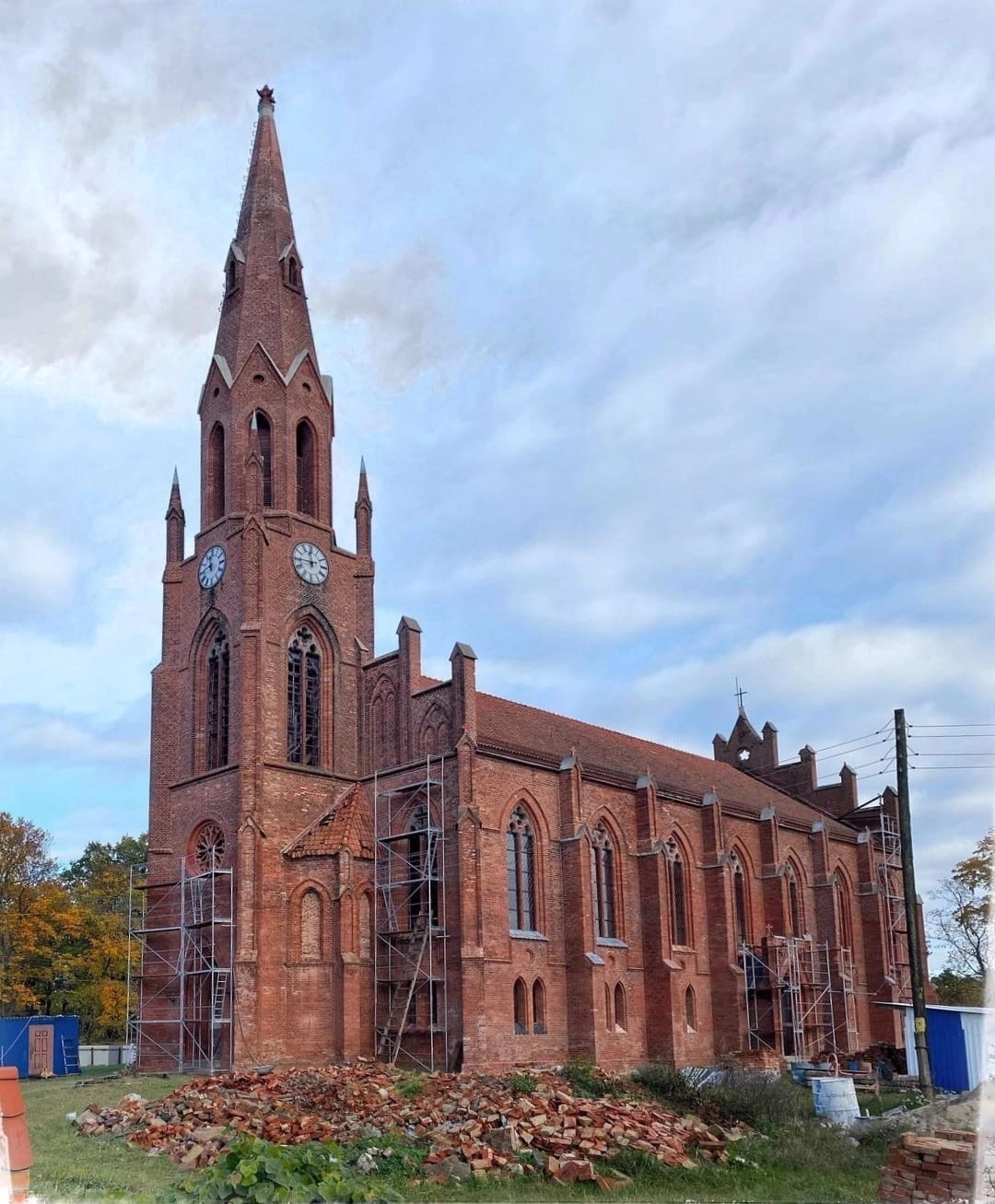
- Church in Slavsk

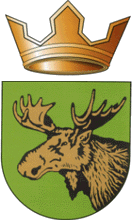
- Coat of arms
- Interactive map of Slavsk
- Location of Slavsk Slavsk (European Russia) Slavsk (Europe) Slavsk (Russia)
- Coordinates: 55°05′N 21°40′E
- Country: Russia
- Federal subject: Kaliningrad Oblast
- Administrative district: Slavsky District
- Town of district significanceSelsoviet: Slavsk
- Founded: 1292
- Elevation: 2 m (6.6 ft)

Population (2010 Census)
  - Total: 4,614
  - Estimate (2023): 4,013 (−13%)

Administrative status
  - Capital of: Slavsky District, town of district significance of Slavsk

Municipal status
  - Municipal district: Slavsky Municipal District
  - Urban settlement: Slavskoye Urban Settlement
  - Capital of: Slavsky Municipal District, Slavskoye Urban Settlement
- Time zone: UTC+2 (MSK–1)
- Postal code: 238600
- OKTMO ID: 27727000001

Slavsk (Russian: Славск; German: Heinrichswalde; Lithuanian: Gastos; Polish: Jędrzychowo) is a town and the administrative center of Slavsky District in the Kaliningrad Oblast, Russia, located 105 kilometers (65 mi) northeast of Kaliningrad. Population figures: 4,614 (2010 census); 5,172 (2002 census); 4,682 (1989 Soviet census).

== History ==
The town was established in 1292 by the Teutonic Knights. In 1454, King Casimir IV Jagiellon incorporated the territory to the Kingdom of Poland upon the request of the anti-Teutonic Prussian Confederation. After the subsequent Thirteen Years' War (1454–1466), it became a part of Poland as a fief held by the Teutonic Knights, and by Ducal Prussia afterwards. The local church was consecrated in 1686. Lithuanian-language church services were held here.

From 1701, it formed part of the Kingdom of Prussia, and in 1819 it became seat of the Prussian Elchniederung district. In 1871 it became part of Germany. In the late 19th century, it had a population of over 1,800, partially Lithuanian. According to German data 16,000 Lithuanians lived in the district in 1890 (29% of the population). Two annual fairs were held in the town in the late 19th century.

== Demographics ==
Historical population
Year	Pop.	±%
1989	4,682	—
2002	5,172	+10.5%
2010	4,614	−10.8%
2018	4,074	−11.7%
2021	4,153	+1.9%

Distribution of the population by ethnicity according to the 2021 census:

	percent
Russians	89.77%
Lithuanians	2.72%
Belarusians	1.93%
Armenians	1.18%
Ukrainians	0.96%
Germans	0.39%
Ingush	0.31%
Poles	0.19%
Refused answer, no nationality or no data	0.94%

== Administrative and municipal status ==
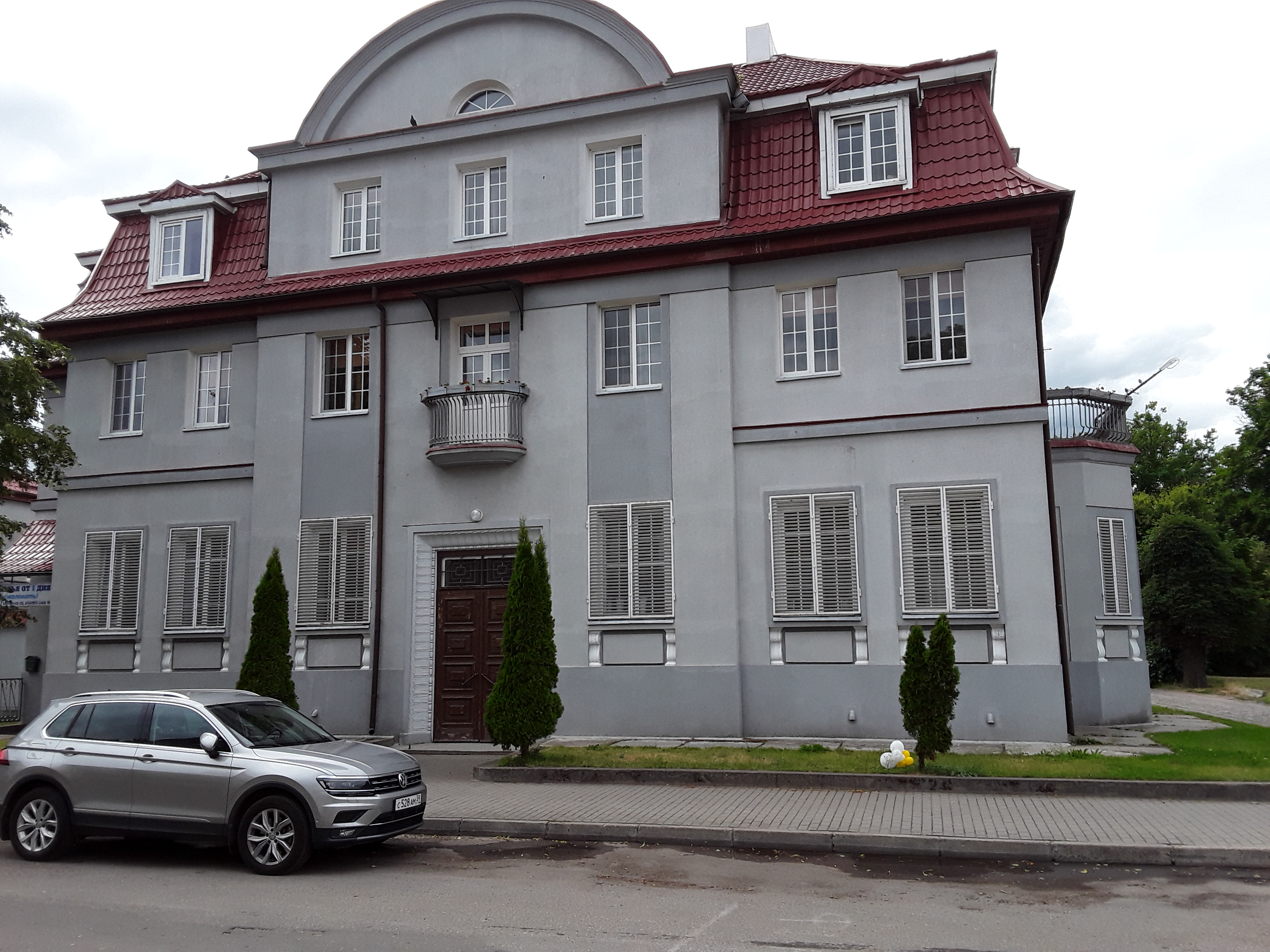
Former district savings bank

Within the framework of administrative divisions, Slavsk serves as the administrative center of Slavsky District. As an administrative division, it is, together with six rural localities, incorporated within Slavsky District as the town of district significance of Slavsk. As a municipal division, the town of district significance of Slavsk was incorporated within Slavsky Municipal District as Slavskoye Urban Settlement.

== Transportation ==
The town has a railway station on the Sovetsk-Kaliningrad railroad.

== Notable people ==
- Ernst Siehr (1869–1945), German lawyer and politician
- Arthur Ewert (1890–1959), German politician
- Andrei Voronkov (1967–), Russian former volleyball player

== Twin towns and sister cities ==
Slavsk is twinned with:

- Ronneby, Sweden
