= Krasnoznamensky, Vladimir Oblast =

Krasnoznamensky Краснознаменский
- Settlement
- Location within Vladimir Oblast Location within Russia
- Coordinates: 56°27′N 40°59′E
- Country: Russia
- Region: Vladimir Oblast
- District: Kameshkovsky District
- Time zone: UTC+3:00

Krasnoznamensky (Russian: Краснознаменский) is a rural locality (a settlement) in Vakhromeyevskoye Rural Settlement, Kameshkovsky District, Vladimir Oblast, Russia. The population was 184 as of 2010. There are 4 streets.

== Geography ==
Krasnoznamensky is located on the Talsha River, 19 km north of Kameshkovo (the district's administrative centre) by road. Vakurino is the nearest rural locality.
