= Slavsky District =

Slavsky District Славский район (Russian)
- District
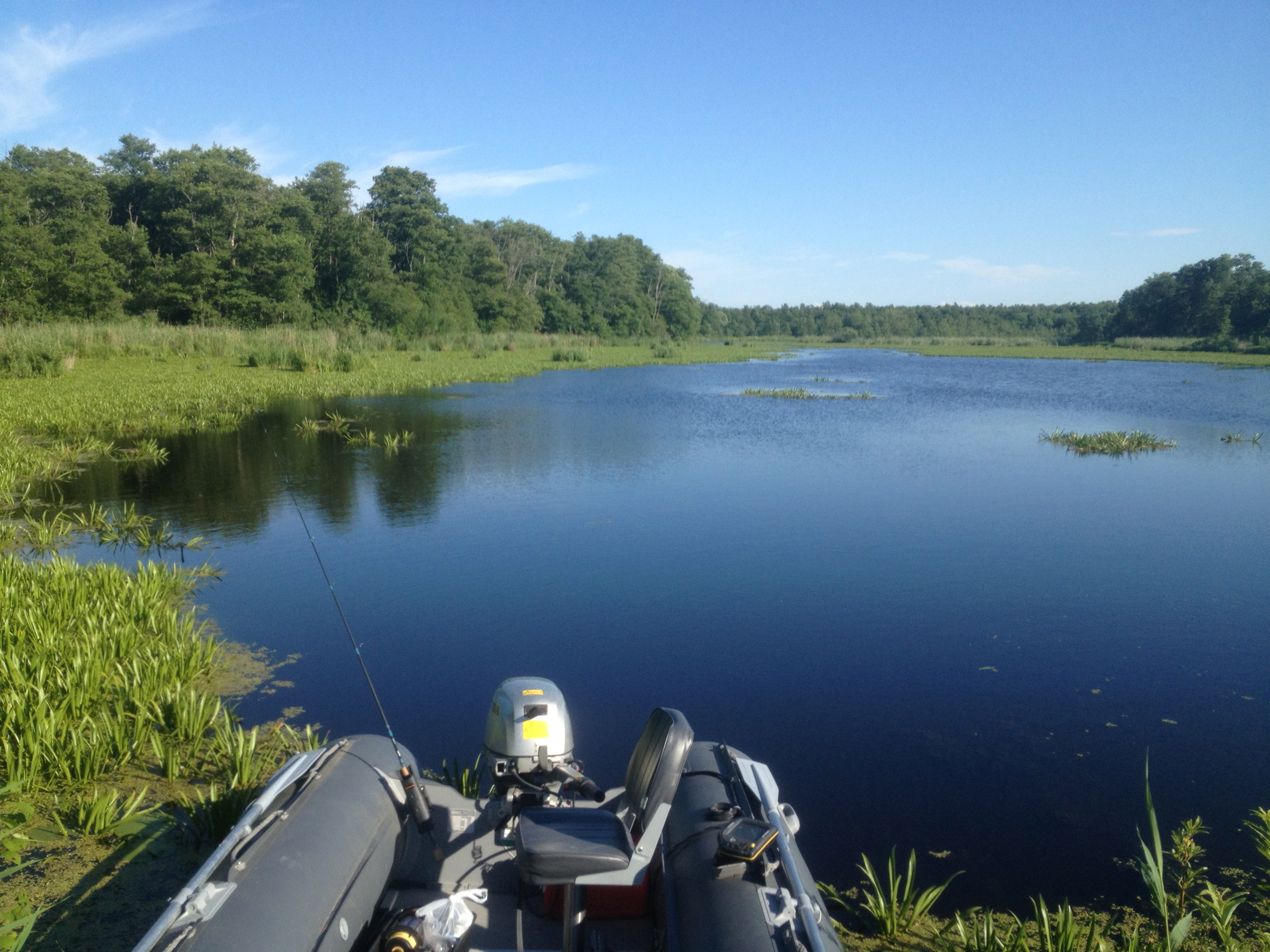
- Landscape in Slavsky District

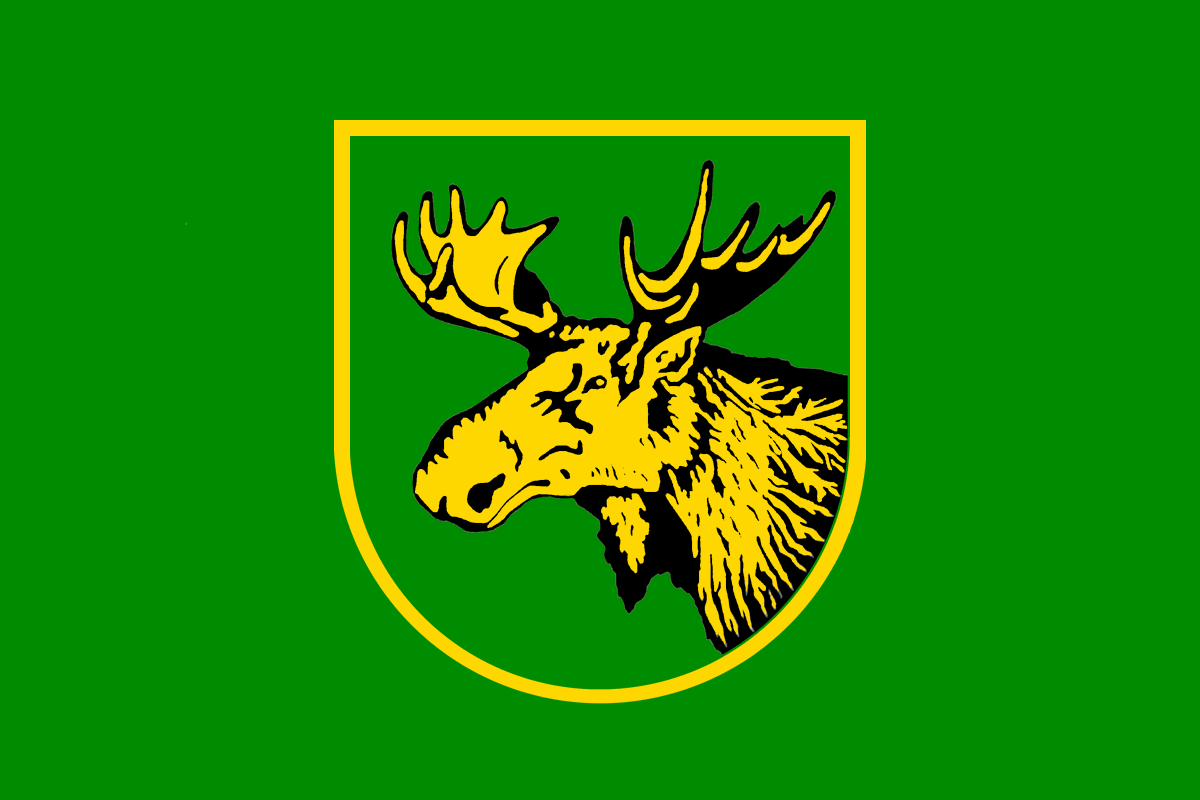
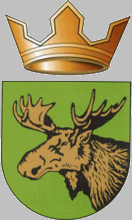
- Flag Coat of arms
- Location of Slavsky District in Kaliningrad Oblast
- Coordinates: 55°03′N 21°40′E
- Country: Russia
- Federal subject: Kaliningrad Oblast
- Established: 7 April 1946
- Administrative center: Slavsk

Area
  - Total: 1,349 km^{2} (521 sq mi)

Population (2010 Census)
  - Total: 21,015
  - Density: 15.58/km^{2} (40.35/sq mi)
  - Urban: 22.0%
  - Rural: 78.0%

Administrative structure
  - Administrative divisions: 1 Towns of district significance, 3 Rural okrugs
  - Inhabited localities: 1 cities/towns, 57 rural localities

Municipal structure
  - Municipally incorporated as: Slavsky Municipal District
  - Municipal divisions: 1 urban settlements, 3 rural settlements
- Time zone: UTC+2 (MSK–1)
- OKTMO ID: 27527000
- Website: http://www.slavsk.info/

Slavsky District (Russian: Сла́вский райо́н) is an administrative district (raion), one of the fifteen in Kaliningrad Oblast, Russia. As a municipal division, it is incorporated as Slavsky Municipal District. It is located in the northern and central parts of the oblast. The area of the district is 1,349 square kilometers (521 sq mi). Its administrative center is the town of Slavsk. Population: 21,015 (2010 census); 21,918 (2002 Census); 20,864 (1989 Soviet census). The population of Slavsk accounts for 22.0% of the district's total population.
