= Krasnoznamensky, Altai Krai =

Krasnoznamensky Краснознаменский
- Settlement
- Location within Altai Krai Location within Russia
- Coordinates: 51°39′N 82°15′E
- Country: Russia
- Region: Altai Krai
- District: Kuryinsky District
- Time zone: UTC+7:00

Krasnoznamensky (Russian: Краснознаменский) is a rural locality (a settlement) in Krasnoznamensky Selsoviet, Kuryinsky District, Altai Krai, Russia. The population was 77 as of 2013. There is 1 street.

== Geography ==
Krasnoznamensky is located 8 km north of Kurya (the district's administrative centre) by road. Novoznamenka is the nearest rural locality.
