= Krasnoznamensky District =

Krasnoznamensky District Краснознаменский район (Russian)
- District
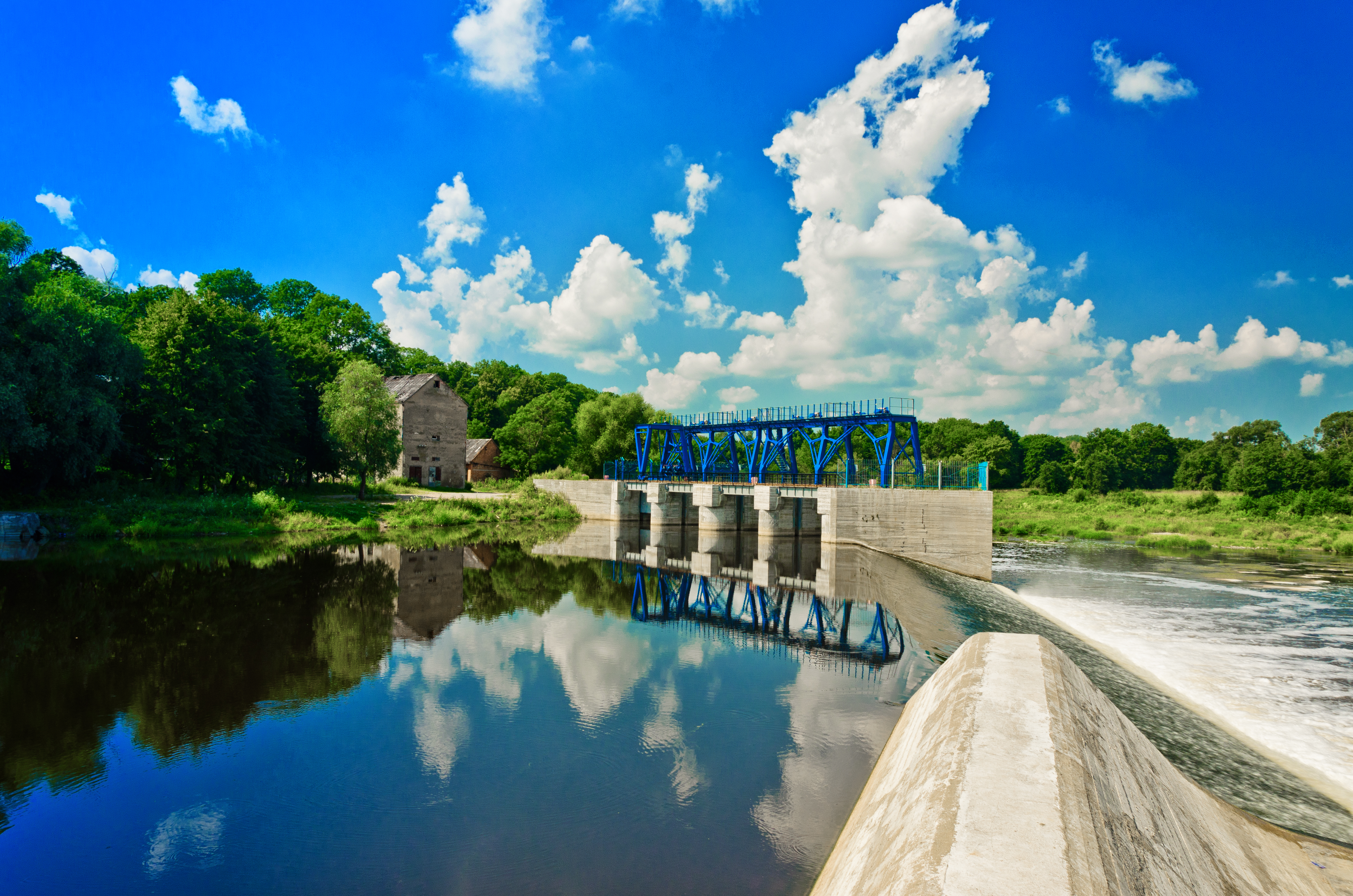
- A damb on the Sheshupe River in Krasnoznamensky District

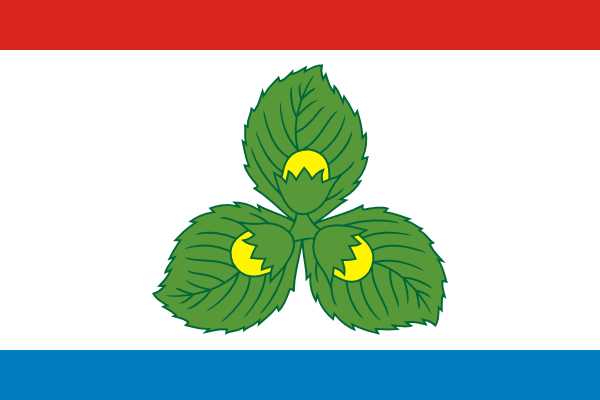
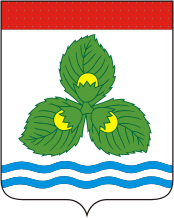
- Flag Coat of arms
- Location of Krasnoznamensky District in Kaliningrad Oblast
- Coordinates: 54°57′N 22°30′E
- Country: Russia
- Federal subject: Kaliningrad Oblast
- Established: September 7, 1946
- Administrative center: Krasnoznamensk

Area
  - Total: 1,280.47 km^{2} (494.39 sq mi)

Population (2010 Census)
  - Total: 12,905
  - Density: 10.078/km^{2} (26.103/sq mi)
  - Urban: 27.3%
  - Rural: 72.7%

Administrative structure
  - Administrative divisions: 1 Towns of district significance, 3 Rural okrugs
  - Inhabited localities: 1 cities/towns, 54 rural localities

Municipal structure
  - Municipally incorporated as: Krasnoznamensky Urban Okrug
- Website: http://krasnoznamensk.gov39.ru

Population of Krasnoznamensky District
- 2010 Census: 12,905
- 2002 Census: 12,961
- 1989 Census: 12,488
- 1979 Census: 12,737

Krasnoznamensky District (Russian: Краснозна́менский райо́н) is an administrative district (raion), one of the fifteen in Kaliningrad Oblast, Russia. It is located in the northeast of the oblast. The area of the district is 1,280.47 square kilometers (494.39 sq mi). Its administrative center is the town of Krasnoznamensk. As of the 2010 Census, the total population of the district was 12,905, with the population of Krasnoznamensk accounting for 27.3% of that number. It is the least densely populated District in Kaliningrad Oblast.

== Geography ==
The district is situated in the far northeast of the oblast, at the border with Lithuania. The Neman River forms its northern border; another river in the district is the Sheshupe.

== History ==
The district was established on September 7, 1946.

== Administrative and municipal status ==
Within the framework of administrative divisions, Krasnoznamensky District is one of the fifteen in the oblast. The town of Krasnoznamensk serves as its administrative center.

As a municipal division, the district has been incorporated as Krasnoznamensky Urban Okrug since May 5, 2015. Prior to that date, the district was incorporated as Krasnoznamensky Municipal District, which was subdivided into one urban settlement and three rural settlements.

== Economy ==
The economy of the district is agrarian. Forests and steppe pasture-land prevail. No major roads or railways pass through, with public transportation being provided mostly by bus routes.
