= Tylzha =

Tylzha Tilse
- Native name: Тыльжа (Russian)

Physical characteristics
- Mouth: Neman
  - coordinates: 55.0814°N 21.9091°E
- Length: 27 km (17 mi)

Basin features
- Progression: Neman→ Baltic Sea

The Tylzha (Russian: Тыльжа, German: Tilse, from Lithuanian: tilžus, meaning "swampy, wet", Greek: Τύλισος) is a 27-kilometre-long (17 mi) river in Kaliningrad Oblast, Russia, discharging into the river Neman at Sovetsk, which until 1946 was called the Tilsit in accordance with it.

== Name and course ==
The river Tilsot or Tilsete is mentioned in reports of the Teutonic Knights. The Lithuanians who immigrated in the 15th and 16th century made Tilszele of it which then became its colloquial name.

=== Sources ===
The source of the Tylzha is located in the southern part of the former district Ragnit, 5 km from the railway station Paballen on the rail line Tilsit - Szillen - Grünheide - Insterburg - Königsberg. In a grove consisting of alders, birches and spruces near Meldienen-Patilßen several streams flow together to form the river Tylzha.

=== Course ===
It flows relatively quickly in the stony river bed in which large erratic boulders lie near Buttkuhnen. There the Tylzha is already 1.5 m wide and a bridge crosses it on the road from Szillen to Kraupischken. Turning northward from here, it passes through Tilsewischken, Balandßen, Ruddecken, Podßuhnen, Pucknen, Kindschen, Jonienen, Kurschen, Schuppinnen, Woydehnen, Moritzkehmen and Tilsit-Kallkappen. On the partially rather high banks groves and meadows stretch out. Picturesque landscapes are the castle hill between Kurschen and Schuppinnen and the gorge at Kurschen. The Grauden forest was an impenetrable wilderness. In the grove of Kindschen the Tylzha takes in the Liepart stream and at Kurschen the Malan stream.

=== Cultivation ===
Since the Tylzha flows through low-lying terrain, the adjacent lands could be well drained. The district administration Tilsit-Ragnit determined in 1931/32 to conduct it into a new bed near Woydehnen. At the same time the lower Tylzha between Kurschen and Tilsit was regulated. At the Willmann hill a 20-metre-long (66 ft) bridge for the railway Stallupönen - Tilsit was built. Through Moritzkehmen and Kallkappen the river reaches the castle mill pond and passes through the Tilszele harbor into the Neman.

=== Castle Mill Pond at Tilsit ===
1562 the reigning governor of Tilsit Kaspar von Nostitz had the castle mill pond dammed, because, when the water volume was sufficient, Duke Albrecht of Brandenburg wanted to construct a water mill for economic reasons.
