= Lithuanian Church, Sovetsk =

Former Lutheran church in Lithuania

Lithuanian Church Lietuvininkų bažnyčia Litauische Kirche
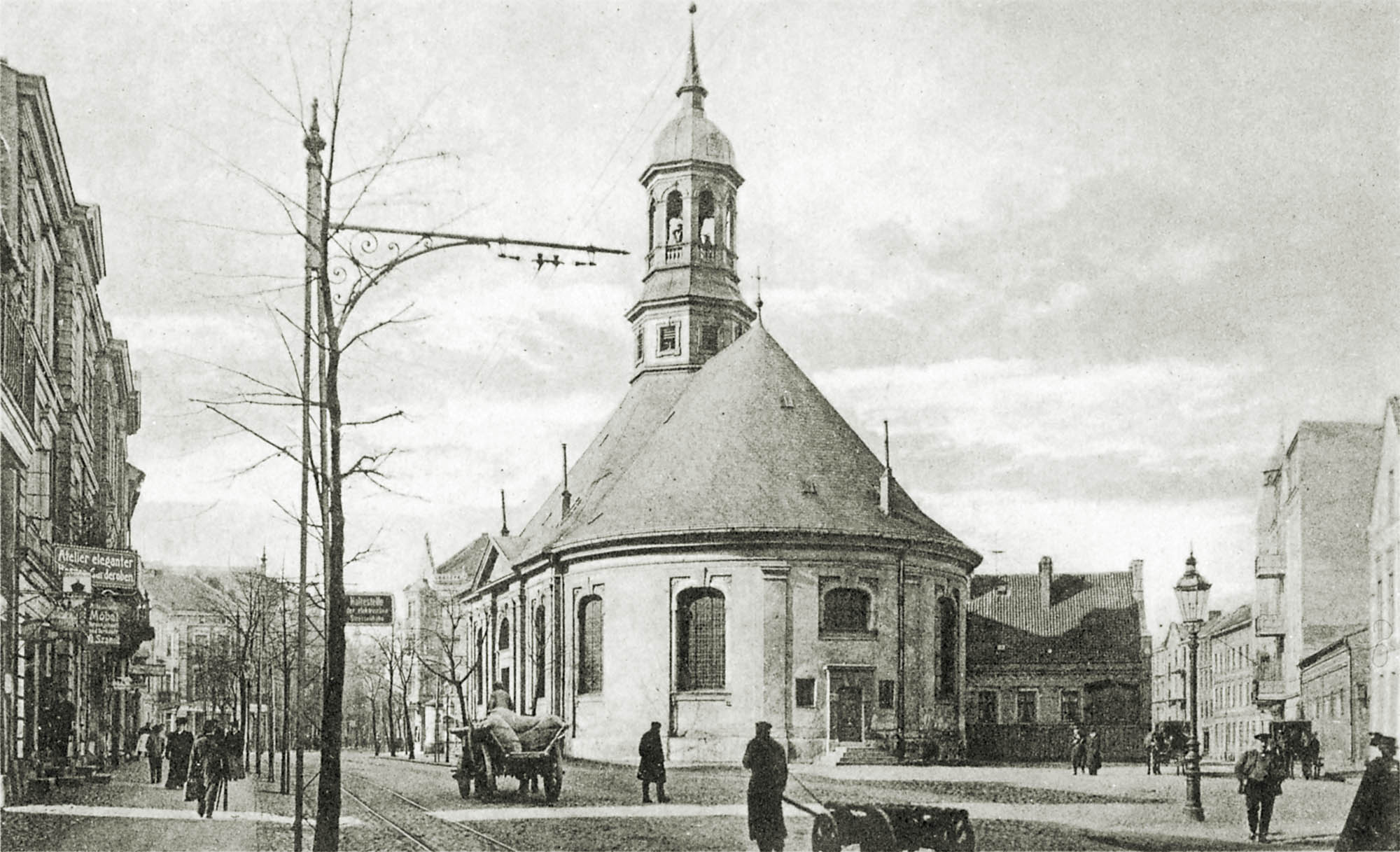
- Façade of the church in 1910–1930

Religion
- Affiliation: Lutheranism
- District: Tilsit Old Town
- Ecclesiastical or organizational status: Demolished
- Leadership: Ecclesiastical Province of East Prussia, Prussian Union of Churches
- Year consecrated: 1757

Location
- Location: Tilsit (now Sovetsk), Russia
- Interactive map of Lithuanian Church; Lietuvininkų bažnyčia Litauische Kirche
- Coordinates: 55°05′N 21°54′E

Architecture
- Architect: Carl Ludwig August Bergius
- Type: Church
- Completed: 1757
- Demolished: 1951/1952
- Materials: Brick masonry

The Lithuanian Church (Lithuanian: Lietuvininkų bažnyčia; German: Litauische Kirche) was a Lutheran church in Tilsit (now Sovetsk), which was completed in 1757 and in it Protestant liturgy were held also in Lithuanian language for Prussian Lithuanians. The church was burned down during the World War II and demolished in 1951/1952.

== Gallery ==
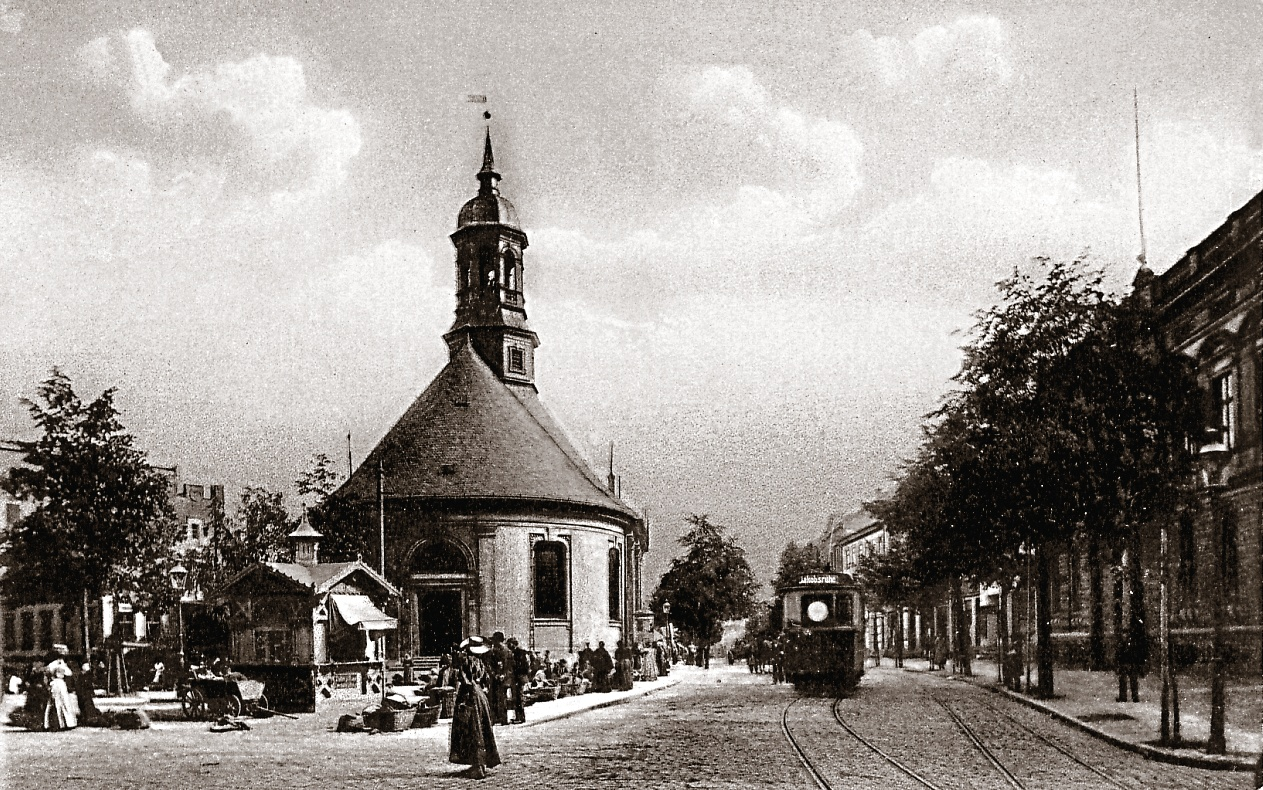
The church in early 20th century

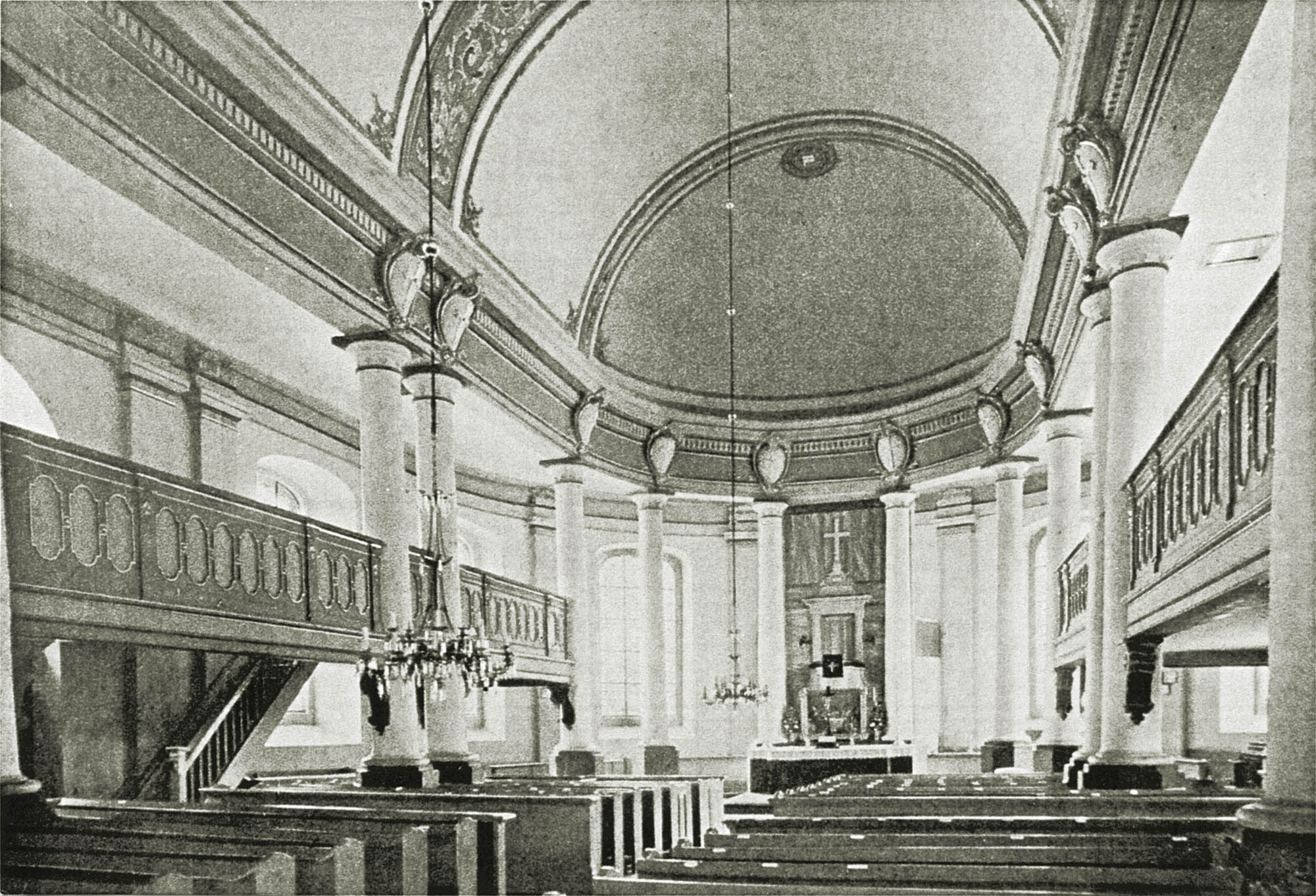
Interior of the church in 1925–1943

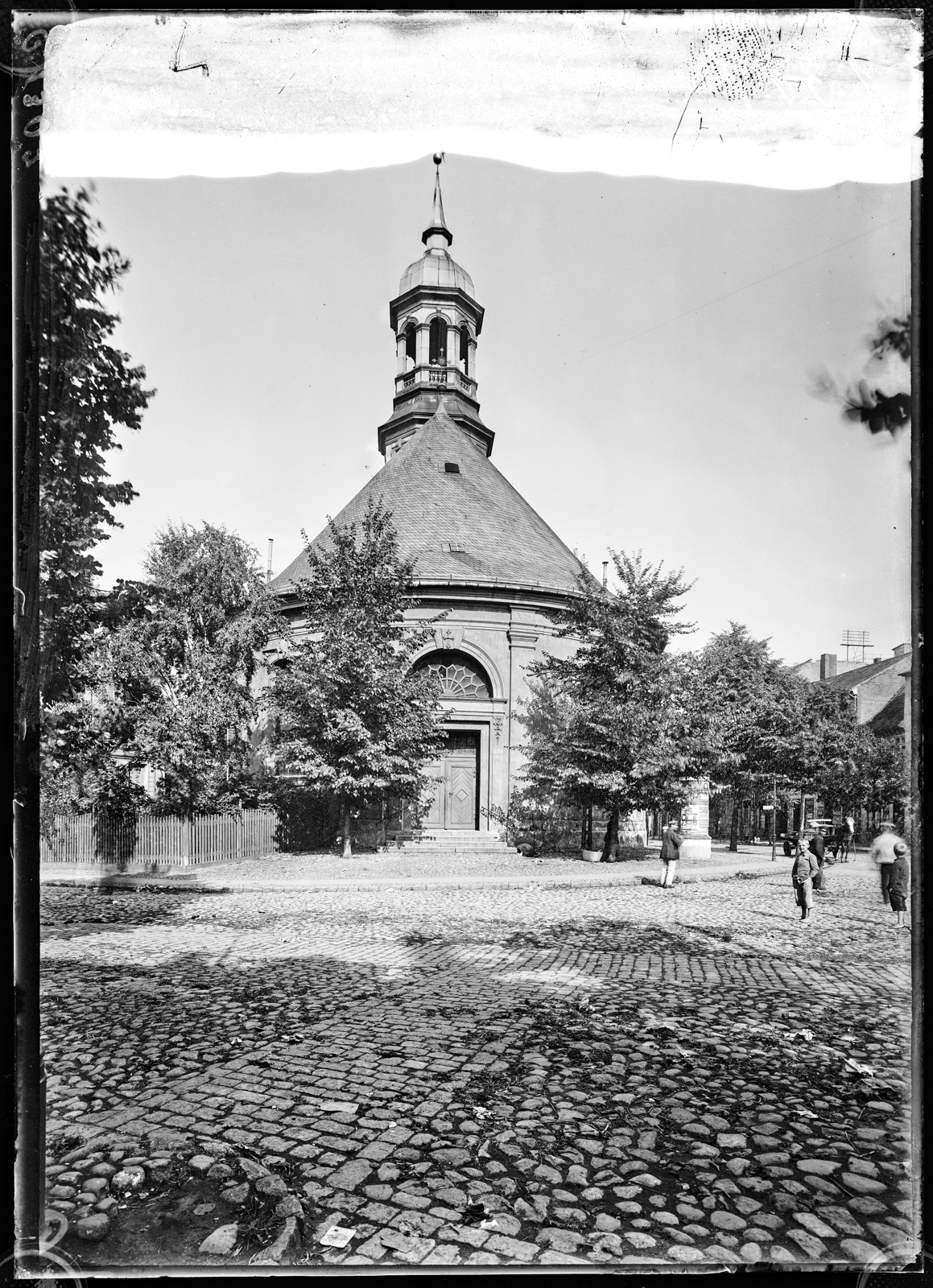
The church in 1920–1938

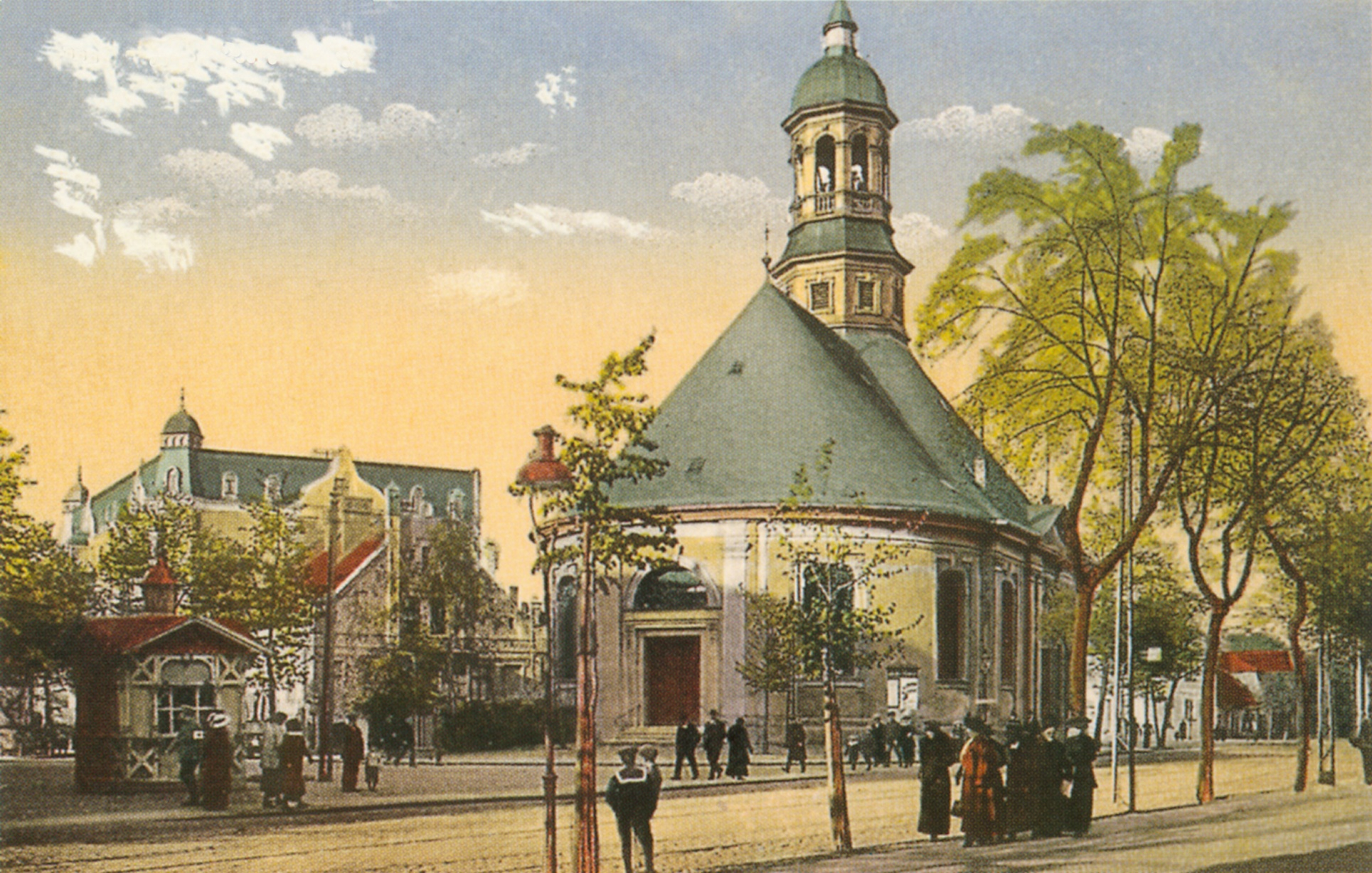
The church before 1944
