= Sovetsk, Kaliningrad Oblast =

Town in Kaliningrad Oblast, Russia

Sovetsk Советск
- Town
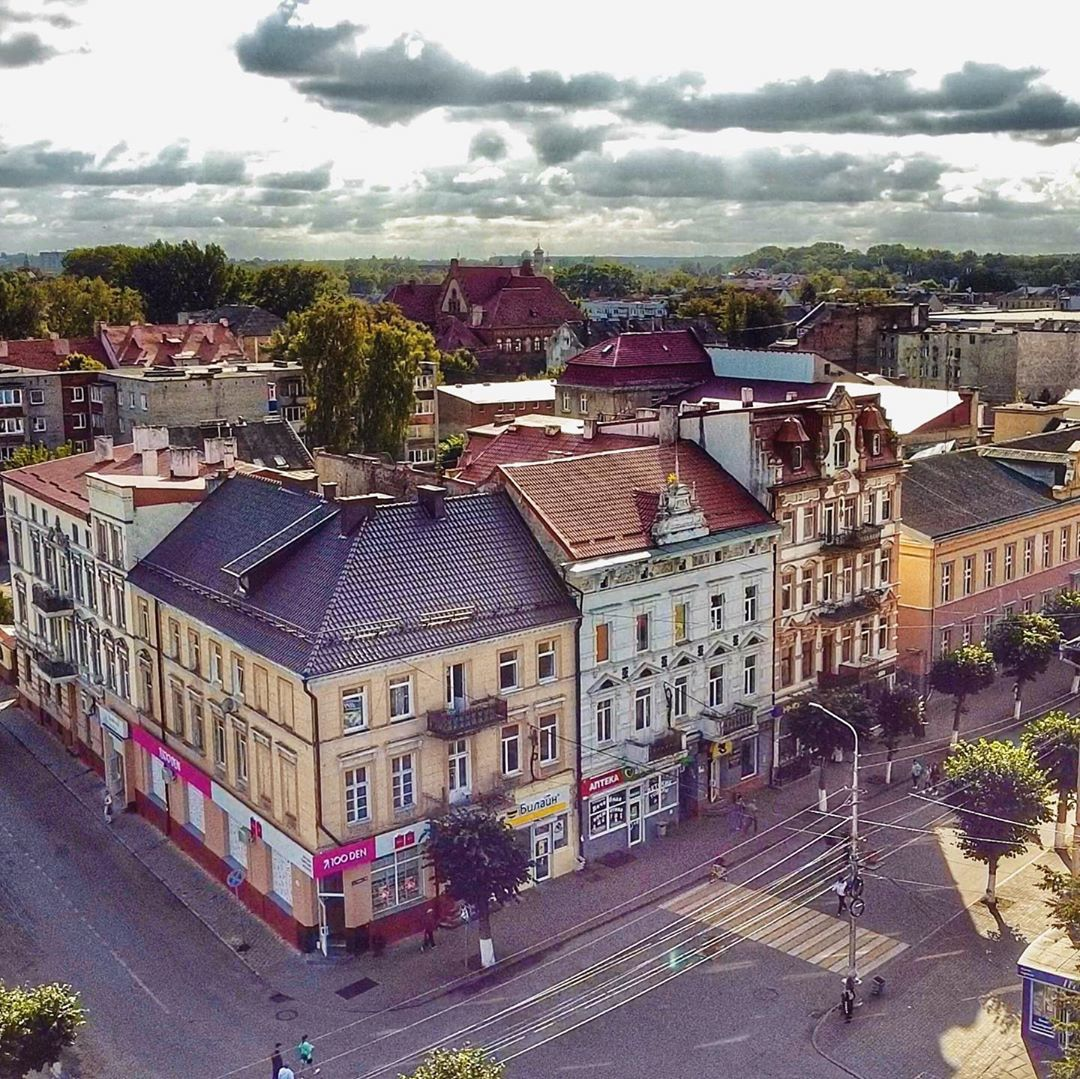
- Historic city center with preserved old townhouses

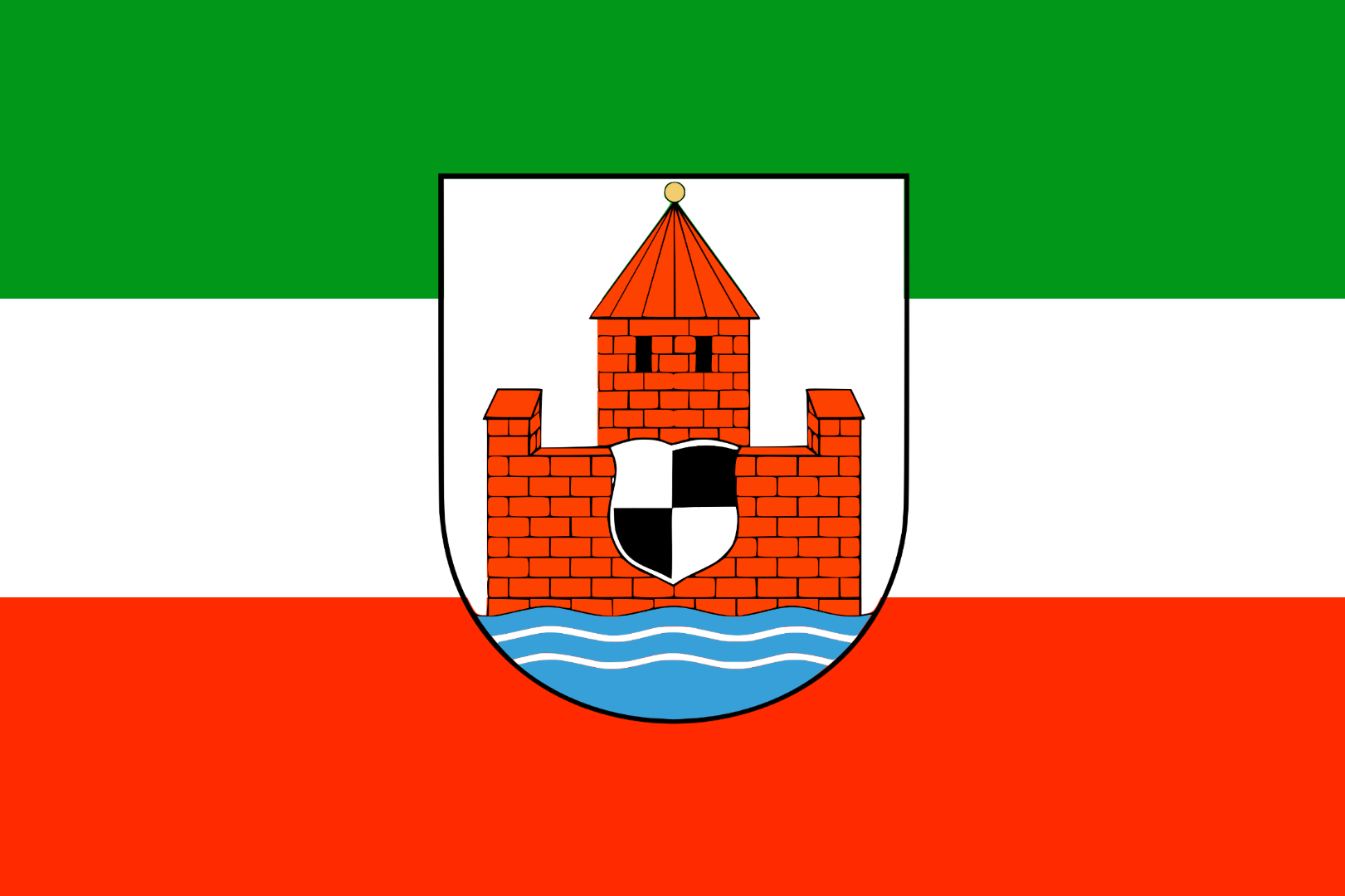
- Flag Coat of arms
- Interactive map of Sovetsk
- Location of Sovetsk Sovetsk (European Russia) Sovetsk (Europe)
- Coordinates: 55°04′51″N 21°53′11″E
- Country: Russia
- Federal subject: Kaliningrad Oblast
- Founded: 1288
- Town status since: 1552

Government
  - Head: Viktor Smilgin
- Elevation: 10 m (33 ft)

Population (2010 Census)
  - Total: 41,705
  - Estimate (2025): 43,224 (+3.6%)

Administrative status
  - Subordinated to: town of oblast significance of Sovetsk
  - Capital of: town of oblast significance of Sovetsk

Municipal status
  - Urban okrug: Sovetsky Urban Okrug
  - Capital of: Sovetsky Urban Okrug
- Time zone: UTC+2 (MSK–1)
- Postal code: 238750
- Dialing code: +7 40161
- OKTMO ID: 27730000001
- Website: sovetsk.gov39.ru

Sovetsk (Russian: Сове́тск; German: Tilsit [ˈtɪlzɪt]; Lithuanian: Tilžė; Polish: Tylża) is a town in Kaliningrad Oblast, Russia, located on the south bank of the Neman River which forms the border with Lithuania.

Founded in the medieval period and granted municipal rights in 1552, it is one of the historically most important towns of the oblast and the traditional capital of the region of Lithuania Minor. It was the place where two treaties were concluded, of great importance in the history of France, Poland, Lithuania, Germany and Russia. It is the place of origin of the Tilsit cheese.

With a population of 38,614 as of 2023 it is the second largest city of the Kaliningrad Oblast.

== History ==
=== Early history ===
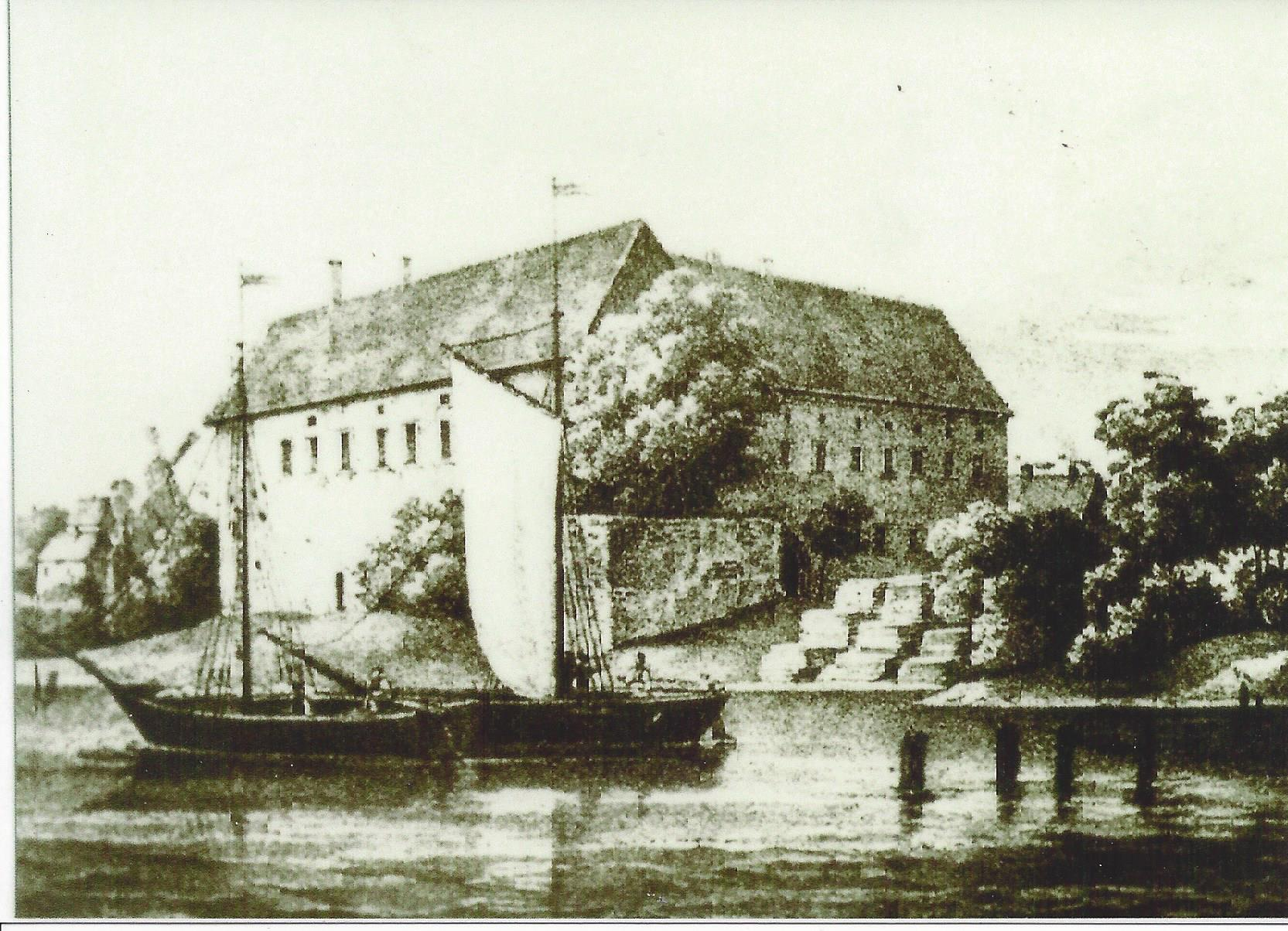
Castle in c. 1800

Tilsit developed around a castle of the Teutonic Knights, known as the Schalauer Haus, founded in 1288. In 1454, King Casimir IV Jagiellon incorporated the region to the Kingdom of Poland upon the request of the Prussian Confederation, which rebelled against the Teutonic Order. After the subsequent Thirteen Years' War (1454–1466), the settlement became a fief of Poland held by the Teutonic Knights, and thus was located within the Polish–Lithuanian union, later elevated to the Polish–Lithuanian Commonwealth. It was granted town rights by Albert, Duke of Prussia in 1552. The town was predominantly Lutheran by confession.

The town developed thanks to its favorable riverside location, becoming an important place for Polish grain transit and linseed trade. Following a legal dispute with the nearby town of Ragnit, it was decided that Tilsit would have exclusive rights to purchase and store Polish grain in the area. In 1586, a provincial school was established. In 1647 a guild of traders and brewers was established. A Reformed school was built in 1701–1703.

As of 1552, there was one church, in which Lithuanian and German services were held, but soon a new separate Lithuanian church was built. Notable 17th-century preachers were Daniel Klein, author of Grammatica Litvanica, the first grammar book of the Lithuanian language, and Jan Malina, author of Polish religious works and panegyrics, including one of the oldest Polish hymnals, and simultaneously superintendent of the Lutheran congregations of the Grand Duchy of Lithuania.

The Polish Doręgowski, Kospot-Pawłowski and Pierzcha noble families lived in Moritzkehmen (now within town limits). The Doręgowski family built a chapel in 1663, renovated in 1692, in which Polish, Lithuanian and German Catholic services were held by the Jesuits. In 1725, 1732 and 1738, King Frederick William I of Prussia ordered the expulsion of the Jesuits from the town, but after interventions by Polish bishops of Warmia, they were allowed to stay.

In the winter of 1678–1679, during the Scanian War, the town was occupied by Sweden. From the 18th century, it was part of the Kingdom of Prussia. During the Great Northern War, several Polish–Lithuanian dignitaries stayed in the town, including Bishop of Vilnius Konstanty Kazimierz Brzostowski, voivode of Vilnius Kazimierz Jan Sapieha, voivode of Brześć Krzysztof Aleksander Komorowski, starost of Minsk Krzysztof Stanisław Zawisza, plus various Polish nobles, and Jesuits fleeing Swedish invaders from Kražiai and Vilnius. Over 1,000 people died during the Great Northern War plague outbreak in 1709–1710. During the Seven Years' War, in 1757–1762, the town was under Russian control. Afterwards it fell back to Prussia. The Russians built the first local pontoon bridge, but after their withdrawal it ceased to exist and ferry crossings were resumed. Then, in 1767, a new bridge, known as the Polish Bridge or Pile Bridge, was built.

=== Late modern period ===
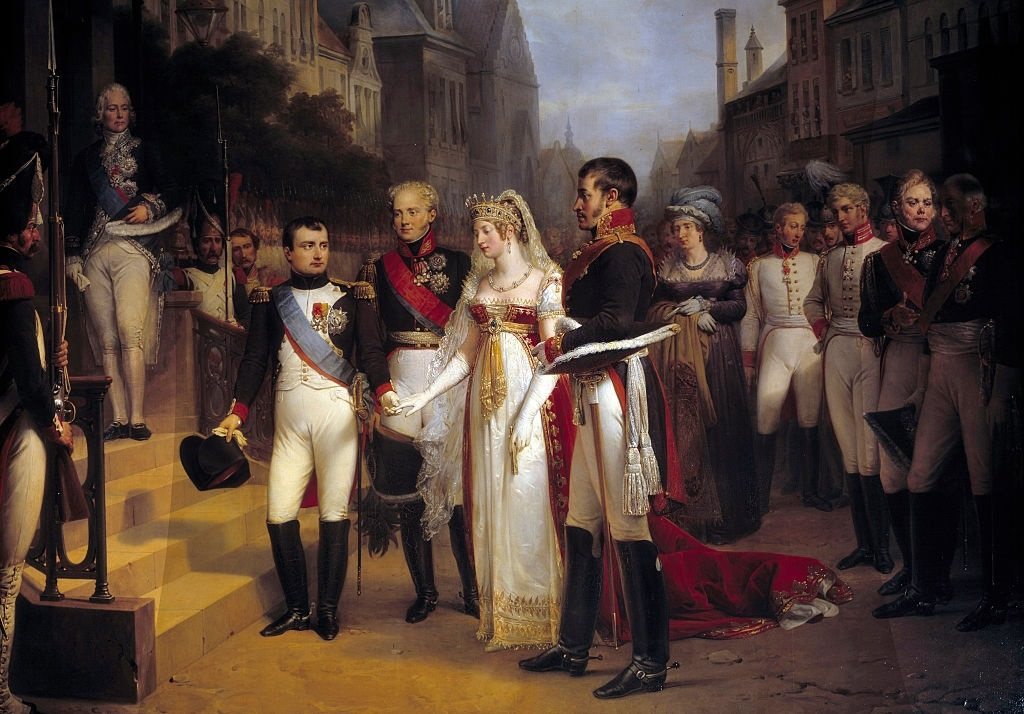
Napoleon, Alexander I, Queen Louise, and Frederick William III in Tilsit, 1807; painted by Nicolas Gosse

The Treaties of Tilsit were signed here in July 1807, the preliminaries of which were settled by the emperors Alexander I of Russia and Napoleon I of France on a raft moored in the Neman River. This treaty, which created the Kingdom of Westphalia and the Duchy of Warsaw, completed Napoleon's humiliation of the Kingdom of Prussia, when it was deprived of one half of its dominions. Three days before its signing, the Prussian queen Louise (1776–1810) tried to persuade Napoleon in a private conversation to ease his hard conditions on Prussia; though unsuccessful, Louise's effort endeared her to the Prussian people.

In 1811, a new ship-of-the-line of the French navy was named Tilsitt, to commemorate this treaty. This ship of 80 guns of the Bucentaure class was built in Antwerp. After the fall of the French empire, the ship was transferred to the new Dutch navy and named Neptunus.

Until 1945, a marble tablet marked the house in which King Frederick William III of Prussia and Queen Louise resided. Also, in the former Schenkendorf Platz was a monument to the poet Max von Schenkendorf (1783–1817), a native of Tilsit; a statue of Lenin was erected in its place in 1967.

Following the unsuccessful Polish November Uprising, hundreds of Polish insurgents, including professors and students of the Wilno University, were interned in the town in 1832. During the January Uprising, a branch of the Polish insurgent organization from Königsberg was based in the city. It was involved in arms trafficking to insurgents in nearby Samogitia.

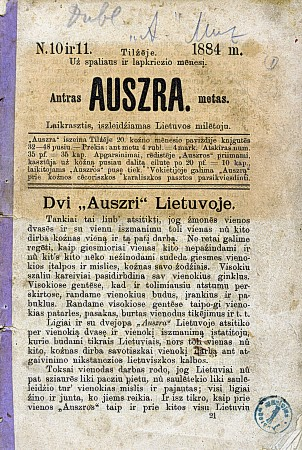
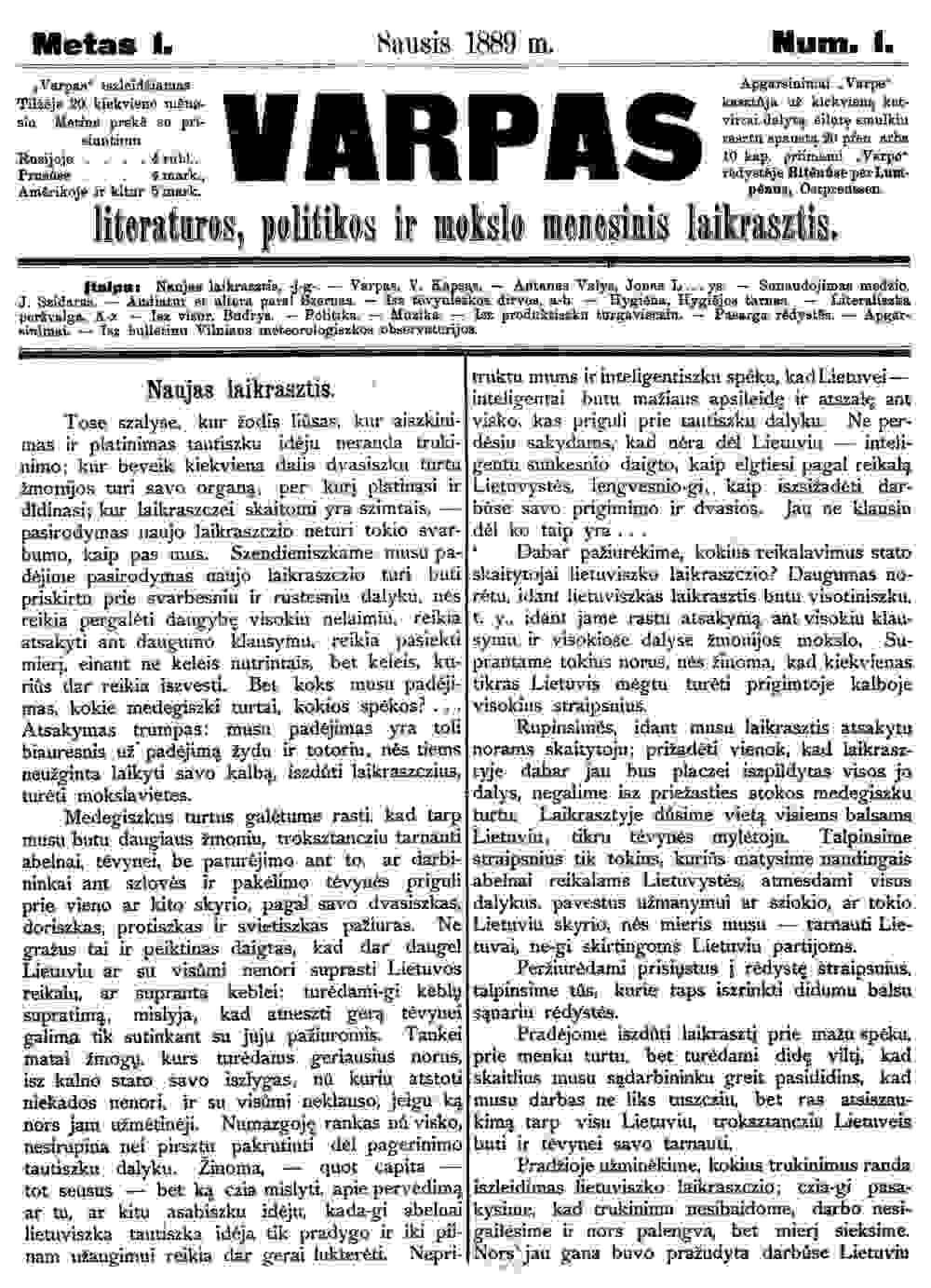
Auszra and Varpas, local 19th-century Lithuanian newspapers

During the 19th century when the Lithuanian language in Latin characters was banned within the Russian Empire, Tilsit was an important centre for printing Lithuanian books which then were smuggled by Knygnešiai to the Russian-controlled part of Lithuania. The Lithuanian Literary Society with a library and an archaeological collection was active in the town. Several Lithuanian newspapers and magazines were published in the city, including Auszra, Šviesa, Varpas, Ūkininkas and Apžvalga.

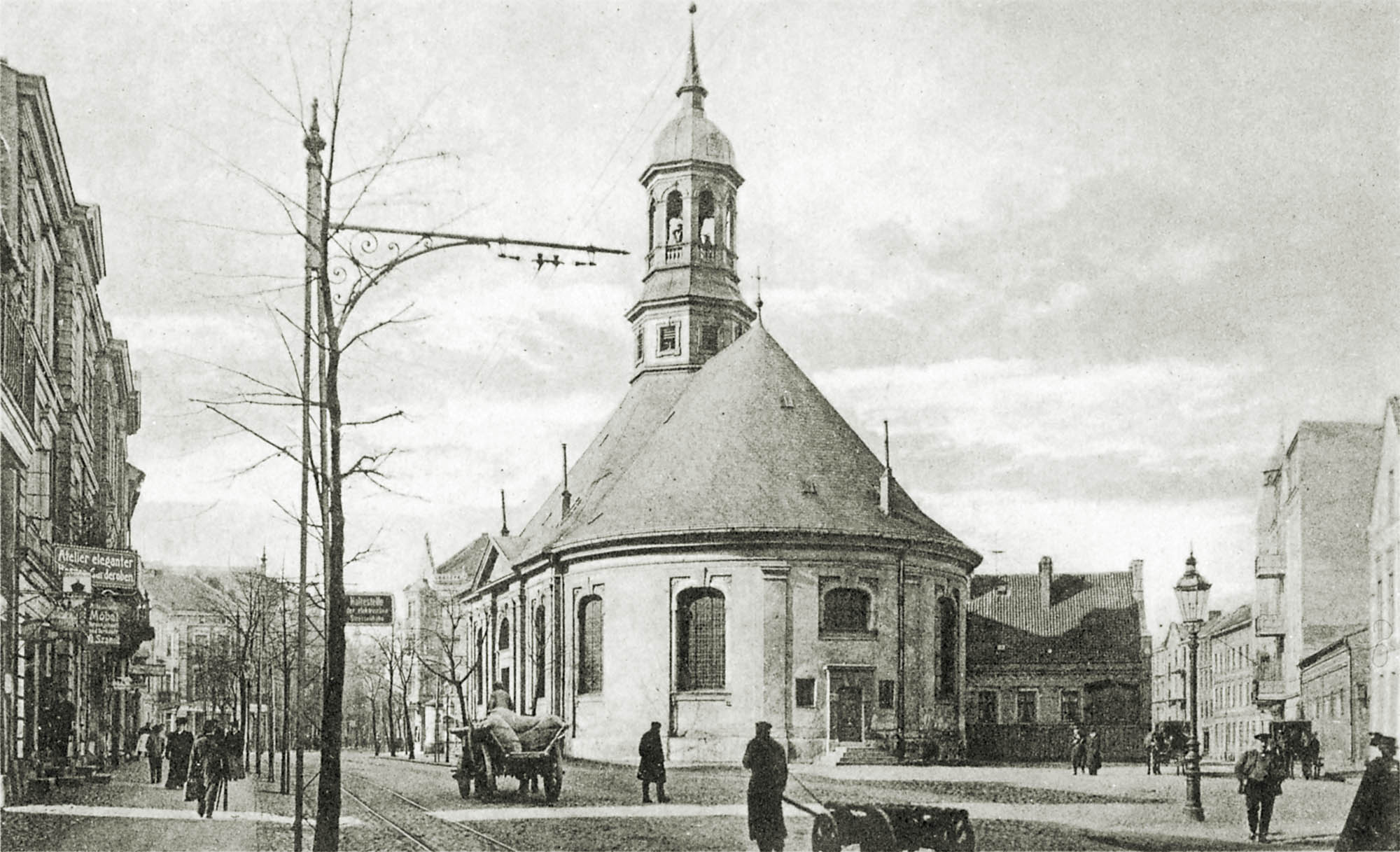
Lithuanian Church, between 1910 and 1930

In the 19th century, there were four churches in the town: two Lutheran (one Lithuanian and one German), one Calvinist, and one Catholic, as well as a synagogue. In general, Tilsit thrived and was an important town. The Geographical Dictionary of the Kingdom of Poland from 1892 referred to the town as the capital of Lithuania Minor. The local Lithuanian population was subjected to Germanisation policies, intensified after the city became part of the German Empire in 1871, which resulted in a decrease in the share of Lithuanians in the town's population. In 1877, weekly German-language services were introduced in the Lithuanian church, alongside the Lithuanian services. In 1884, Lithuanians formed 13% of the town's population. By 1900 it had electric tramways and 34,500 inhabitants; a direct railway line linked it to Königsberg (Kaliningrad) and Labiau (Polessk) and steamers docked there daily. According to the Prussian census of 1905, the city of Tilsit had a population of 37,148, of which 96% were Germans and 4% were Lithuanians. The bridge was built in 1907 and rebuilt in 1946. The town was occupied by Russian troops between 26 August 1914 and 12 September 1914 during World War I. The Act of Tilsit was signed here by leaders of the Lietuvininks in 1918.

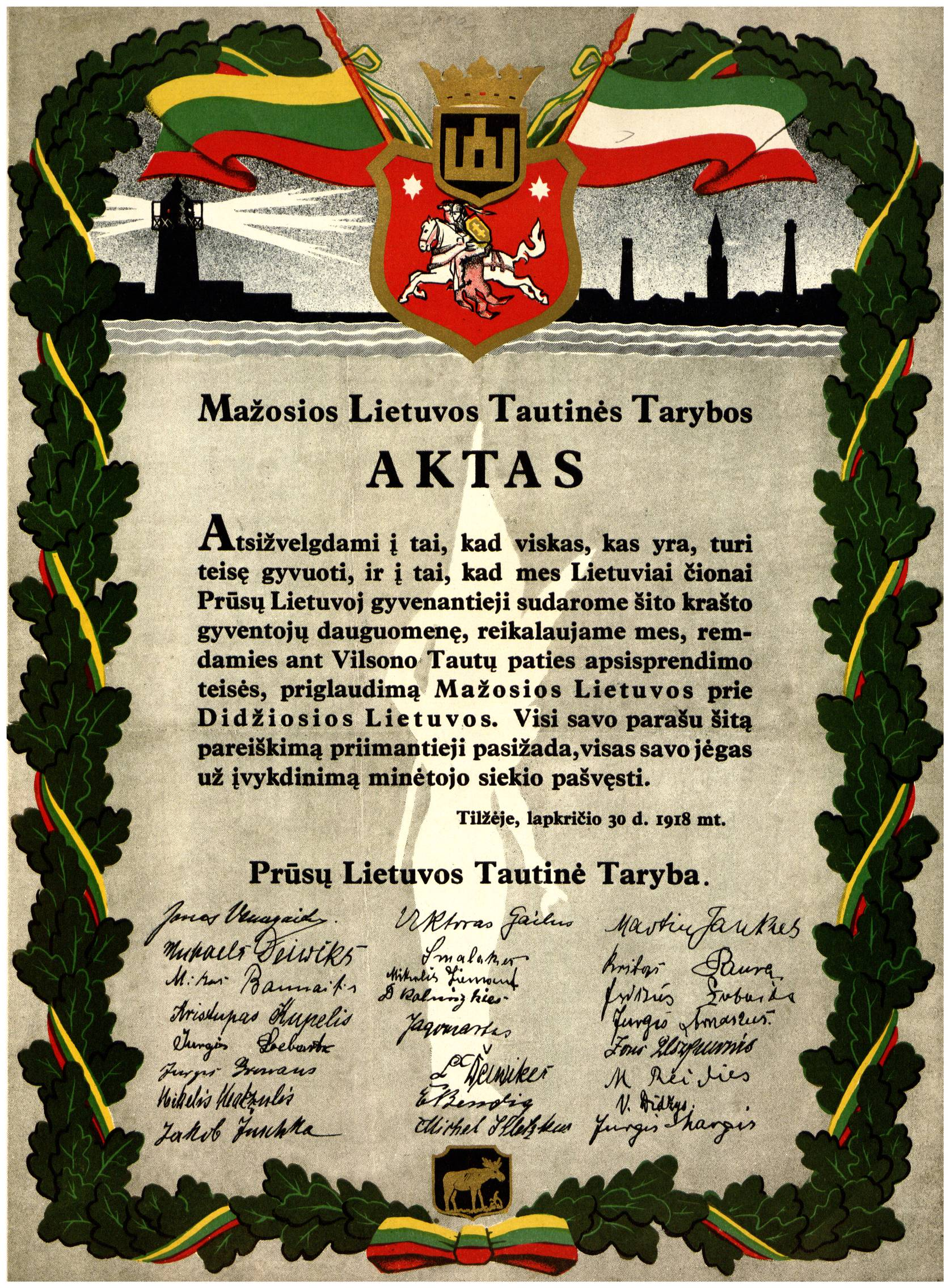
Act of Tilsit

In 1938, six districts of the city were renamed by the Nazis to erase traces of non-German origin.

=== World War II and post-war period ===
Hitler visited the town just before World War II, and a photo was taken of him on the famous bridge over the Neman River. During the war, the Germans operated a forced labour subcamp of the Stalag I-A prisoner-of-war camp for Allied POWs in the town, and expelled Poles from German-occupied Poland were also enslaved as forced labour in the town's vicinity. Tilsit was occupied by the Red Army on January 20, 1945 (during the East Prussian offensive), and was annexed by the Soviet Union in 1945. The remaining Germans who had not evacuated were subsequently expelled in accordance with the Potsdam Agreement and replaced with Soviet citizens. The town was renamed Sovetsk in honor of Soviet rule.

Modern Sovetsk has sought to take advantage of Tilsit's tradition of cheese production (Tilsit cheese), but the new name ("Sovetsky cheese") has not inherited its predecessor's reputation.

Since the dissolution of the Soviet Union in 1991, there has been some discussion about the possibility of restoring the town's original name. In 2010, the Kaliningrad Oblast's then-governor Georgy Boos of the ruling United Russia Party proposed restoring the original name and combining the town with the Neman and Slavsk Districts to form a new Tilsit District. Boos emphasized that this move would stimulate development and economic growth, but that it could happen only through a referendum. The idea was opposed by the Communist Party of Russia; in particular, Igor Revin, the Kaliningrad Secretary of the Communist Party, accused Boos and United Russia of Germanophilia.

In April 2007, government restrictions on visits to border areas were tightened, and for foreigners, and Russians living outside the border zone, travel to the Sovetsk and Bagrationovsk areas required advance permission from the Border Guard Service (in some cases up to 30 days beforehand). It was alleged that this procedure slowed the development of these potentially thriving border towns. In June 2012, these restrictions were lifted (the only restricted area is the Neman river shoreline), which gave a boost to local and international tourism.

== Geography ==
Sovetsk lies in the historic region of Lithuania Minor at the confluence of the Tylzha and Neman rivers. Panemunė in Lithuania was formerly a suburb of the town; after Germany's defeat in World War I, the trans-Neman suburb was detached from Tilsit (with the rest of the Klaipėda Region) in 1920.

=== Climate ===
Sovetsk has a borderline oceanic climate (Cfb in the Köppen climate classification) using the −3 °C or 26.6 °F boundary, or a humid continental climate (Dfb) using the 0 °C or 32 °F boundary.

Climate data for Sovetsk
Month	Jan	Feb	Mar	Apr	May	Jun	Jul	Aug	Sep	Oct	Nov	Dec	Year
Mean daily maximum °C (°F)	−0.6 (30.9)	0.7 (33.3)	5.4 (41.7)	12.3 (54.1)	17.5 (63.5)	20.2 (68.4)	22.8 (73.0)	22 (72)	17.5 (63.5)	11.1 (52.0)	6 (43)	2.1 (35.8)	11.4 (52.6)
Daily mean °C (°F)	−2.7 (27.1)	−1.8 (28.8)	1.8 (35.2)	7.8 (46.0)	13.1 (55.6)	16.4 (61.5)	19 (66)	18.3 (64.9)	14 (57)	8.4 (47.1)	4.2 (39.6)	0.4 (32.7)	8.2 (46.8)
Mean daily minimum °C (°F)	−5 (23)	−4.5 (23.9)	−1.8 (28.8)	2.9 (37.2)	8 (46)	11.8 (53.2)	14.8 (58.6)	14.4 (57.9)	10.5 (50.9)	5.8 (42.4)	2.3 (36.1)	−1.4 (29.5)	4.8 (40.6)
Average precipitation mm (inches)	59 (2.3)	50 (2.0)	51 (2.0)	46 (1.8)	56 (2.2)	75 (3.0)	95 (3.7)	83 (3.3)	65 (2.6)	68 (2.7)	60 (2.4)	57 (2.2)	765 (30.2)
Source: https://en.climate-data.org/asia/russian-federation/kaliningrad/sovetsk-12841

== Administrative and municipal status ==
Within the framework of administrative divisions, it is incorporated as the town of oblast significance of Sovetsk—an administrative unit with the status equal to that of the districts. As a municipal division, the town of oblast significance of Sovetsk is incorporated as Sovetsky Urban Okrug.

== Architecture ==
Many of the town's buildings were destroyed during World War II. However, the old town centre still includes several pre-war buildings, including those of Jugendstil design. The Queen Louise Bridge, now connecting the town to Panemunė in Lithuania, retains an arch – all that is left of a more complex pre-war bridge structure built in 1907. The carved relief portrait of Queen Louise above the arch still exists; however, the German inscription "KÖNIGIN LUISE-BRÜCKE" was removed after the Soviets took over the town.

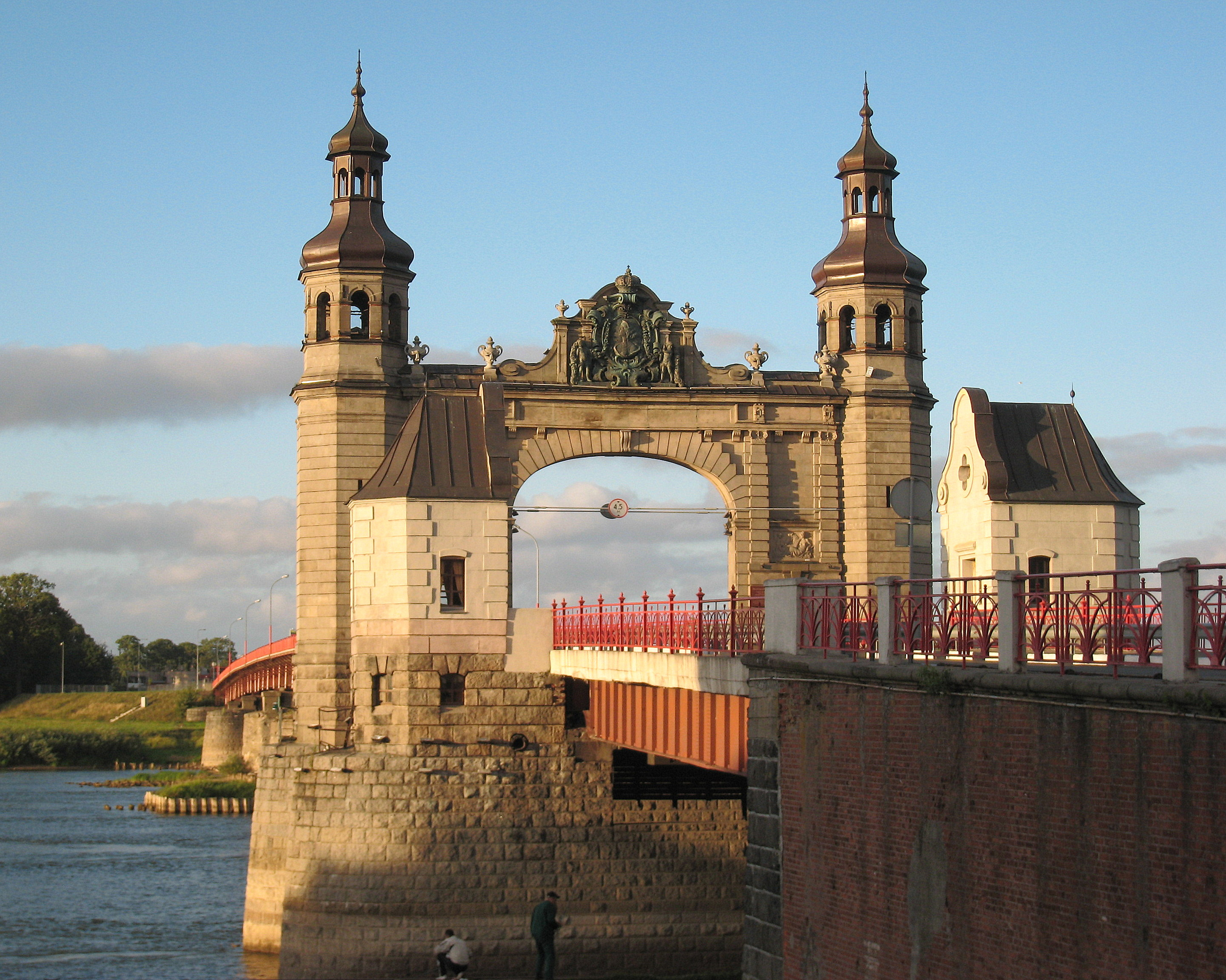
Queen Louise bridge

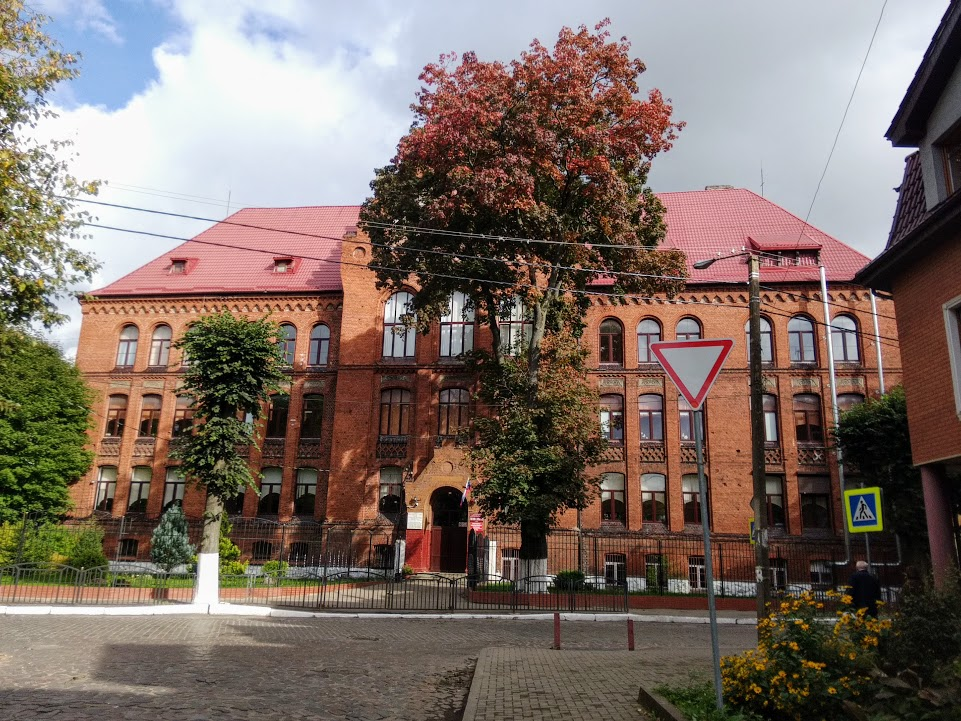
Gymnasium

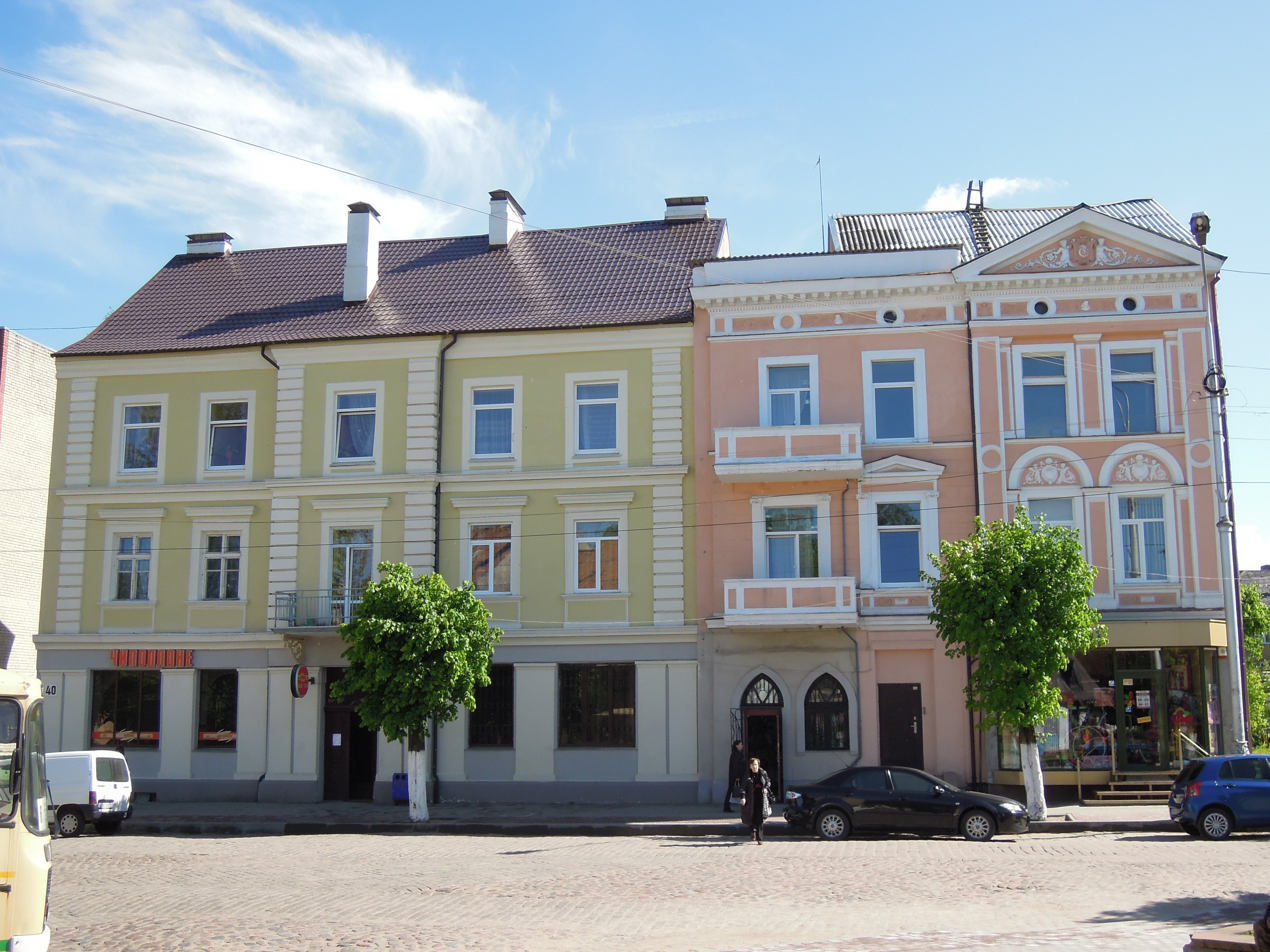
Old townhouses

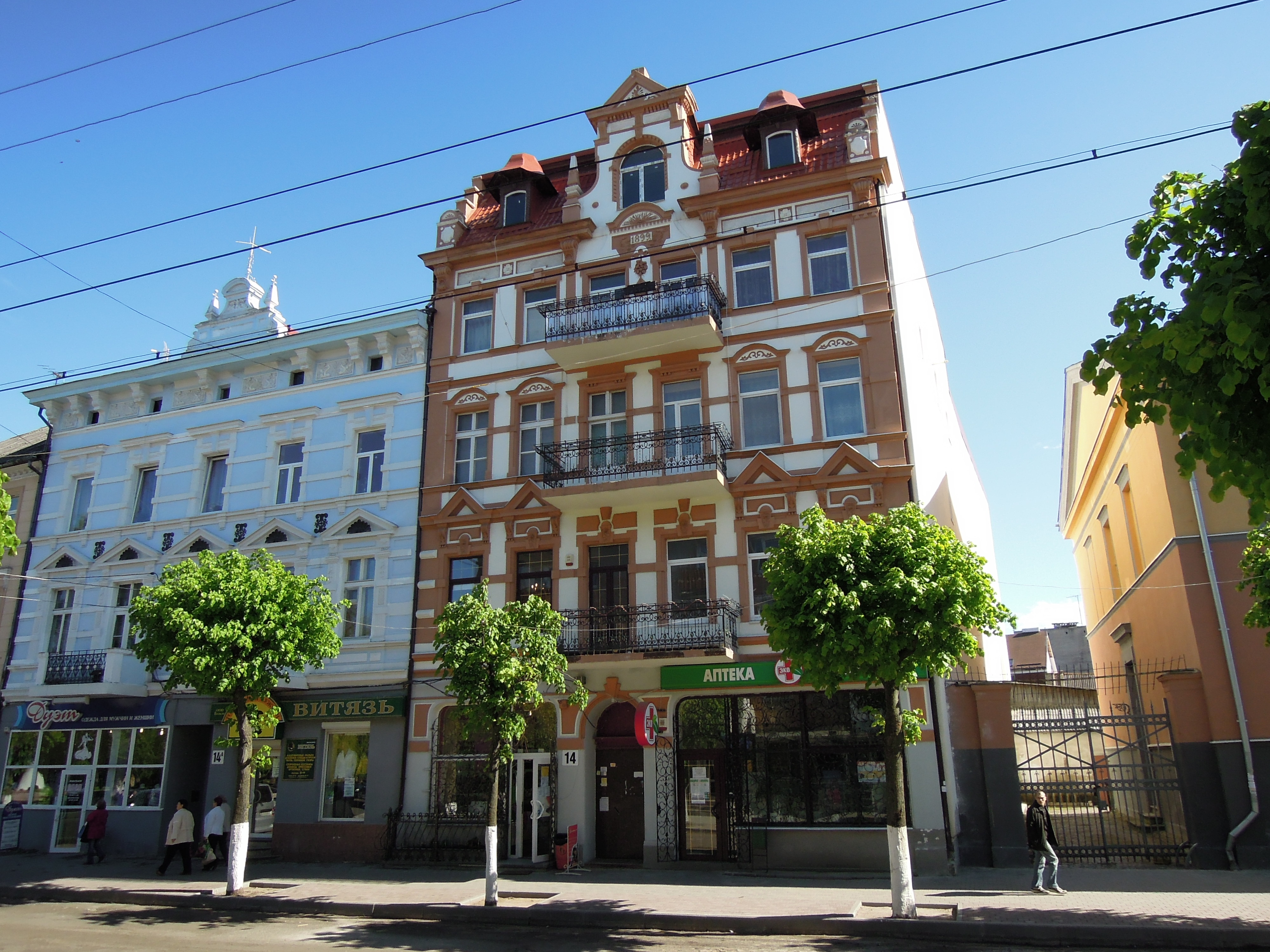
Old townhouses

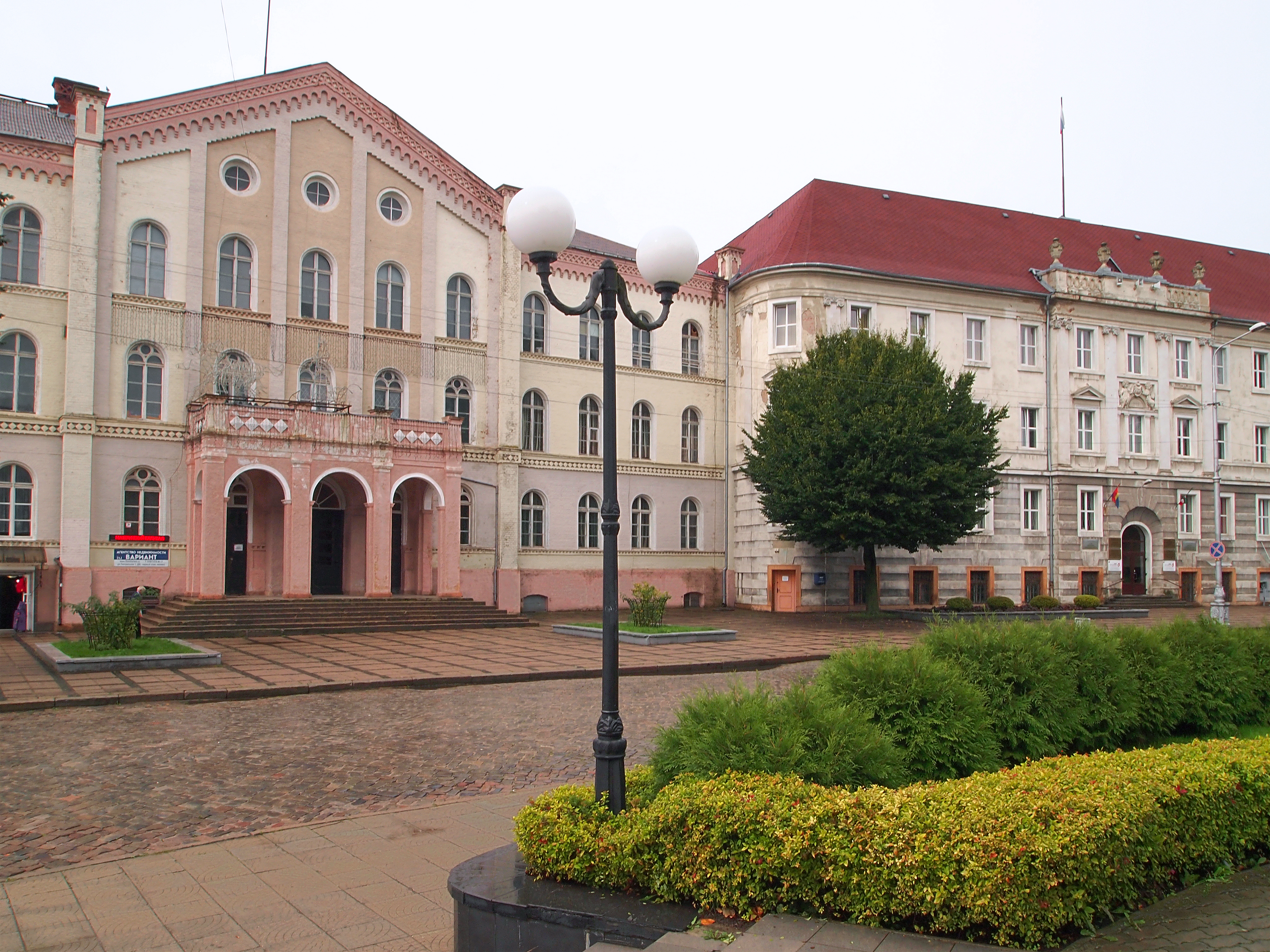
Court buildings

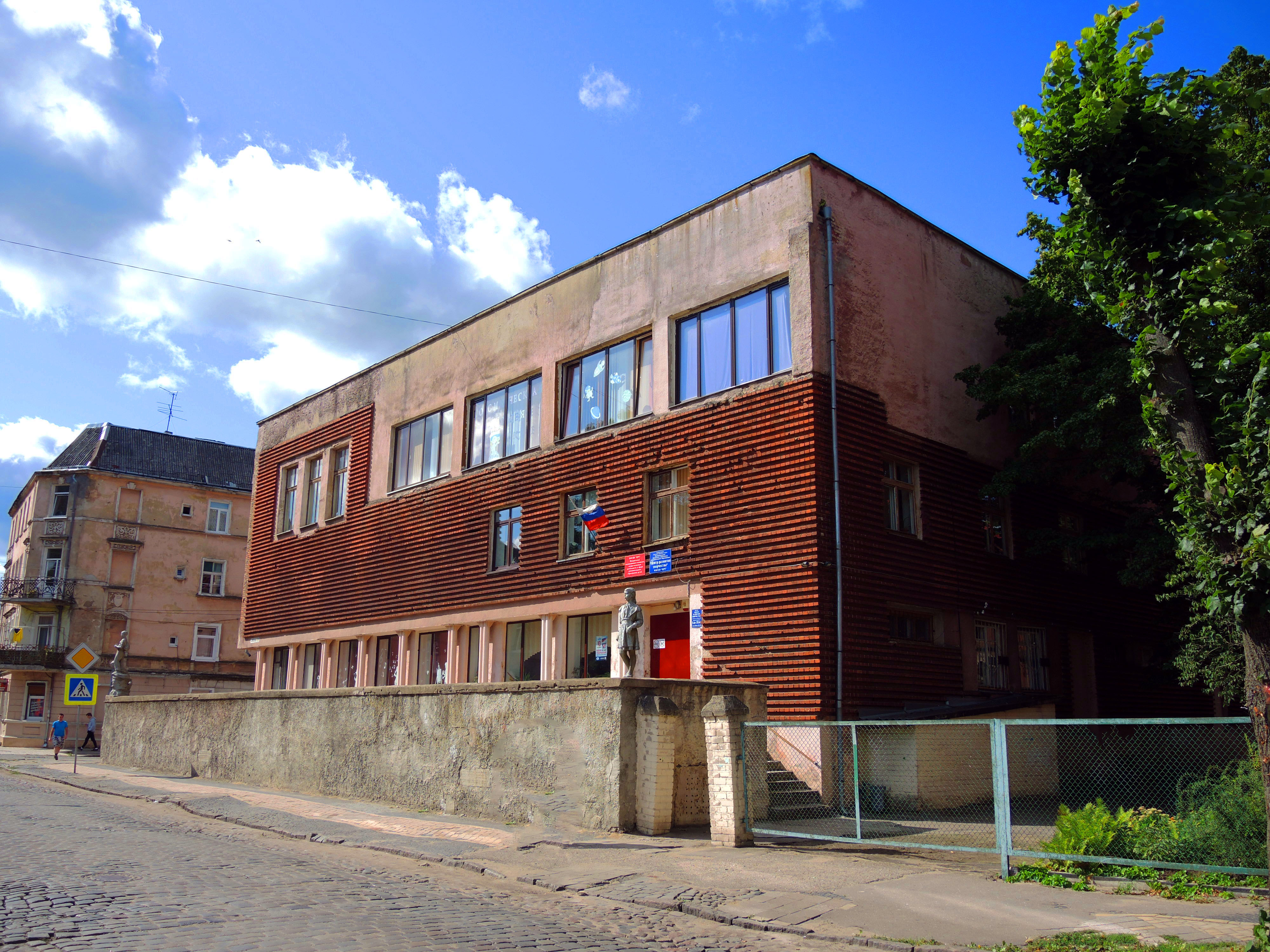
New Loge, built 1925–1926 by Erich Mendelsohn

== Historical population ==
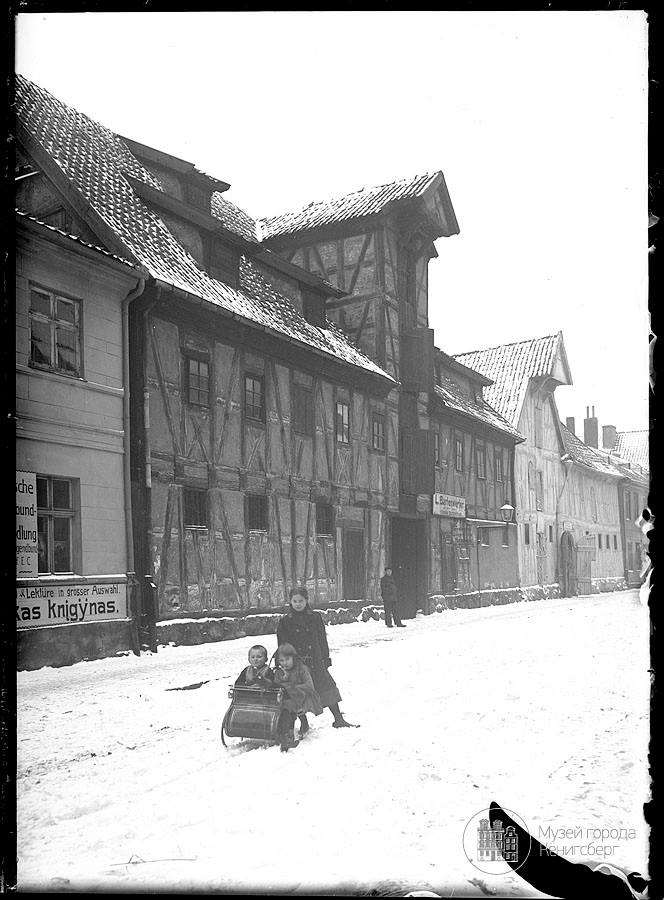
Half-timbered warehouses in Tilsit in 1910. One of them has a billboard in Lithuanian language Knįgÿnas (book store)

Historical population

Year	Pop.	±%
1816	10,548	—
1821	11,248	+6.6%
1880	21,400	+90.3%
1891	24,126	+12.7%
1900	34,539	+43.2%
1910	39,013	+13.0%

Year	Pop.	±%
1925	50,834	+30.3%
1933	57,286	+12.7%
1939	59,105	+3.2%
1946	6,500	−89.0%
1959	31,941	+391.4%
1989	41,881	+31.1%

Year	Pop.	±%
2002	43,224	+3.2%
2004	43,300	+0.2%
2010	41,705	−3.7%
2021	38,910	−6.7%

Ethnic composition in 2021:

- Russians: 86.0%
- Lithuanians: 1.23%
- Ukrainians: 1.01%
- Belarusians: 0.71%
- Romani: 0.44%
- Armenians: 0.33%
- Tatars: 0.23%
- Germans: 0.21%
- Azeris: 0.17%
- Uzbeks: 0.15%
- Poles: 0.11%
- Tajiks: 0.08%
- Kazakhs: 0.07%
- Georgians: 0.06%
- Kyrgyz: 0.06%
- Lezgins: 0.06%

== Twin towns – sister cities ==
Sovetsk is twinned with:

- Kiel, Germany
- Považská Bystrica, Slovakia

== Notable people ==
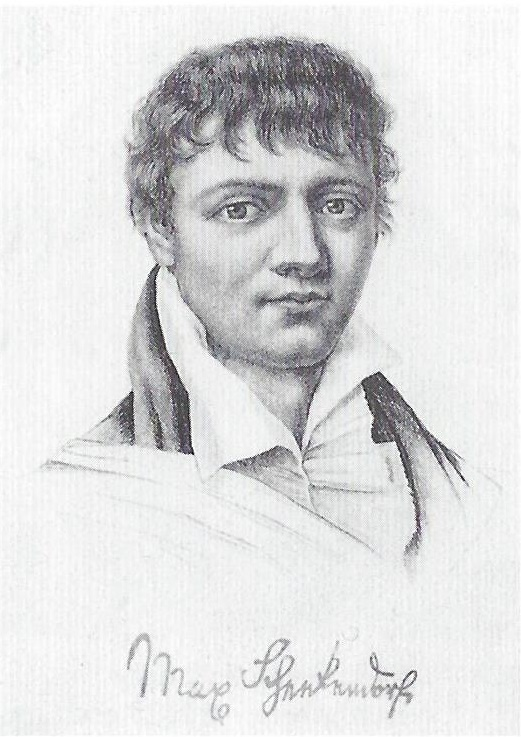
Max von Schenkendorf

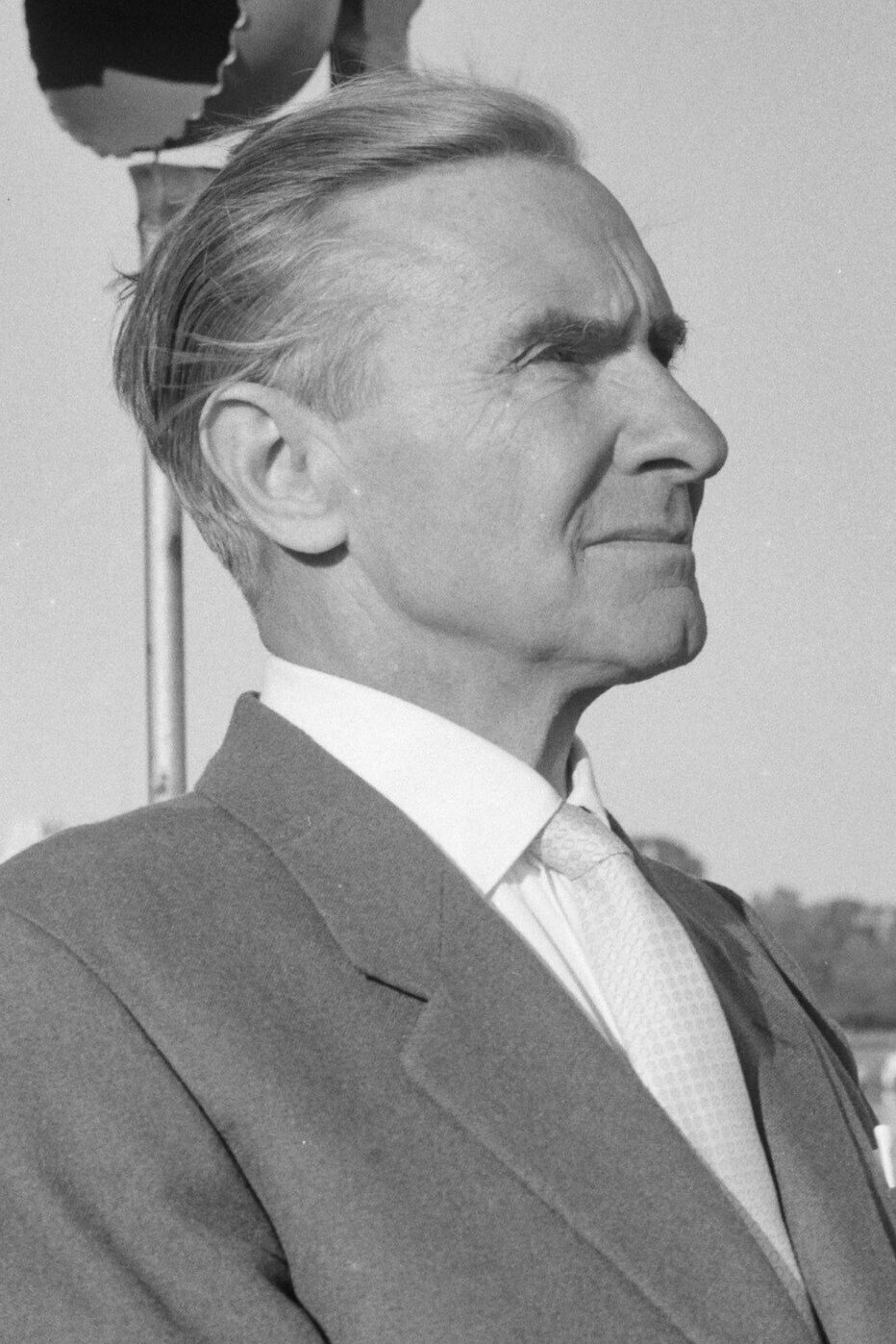
Frank Wisbar, 1959

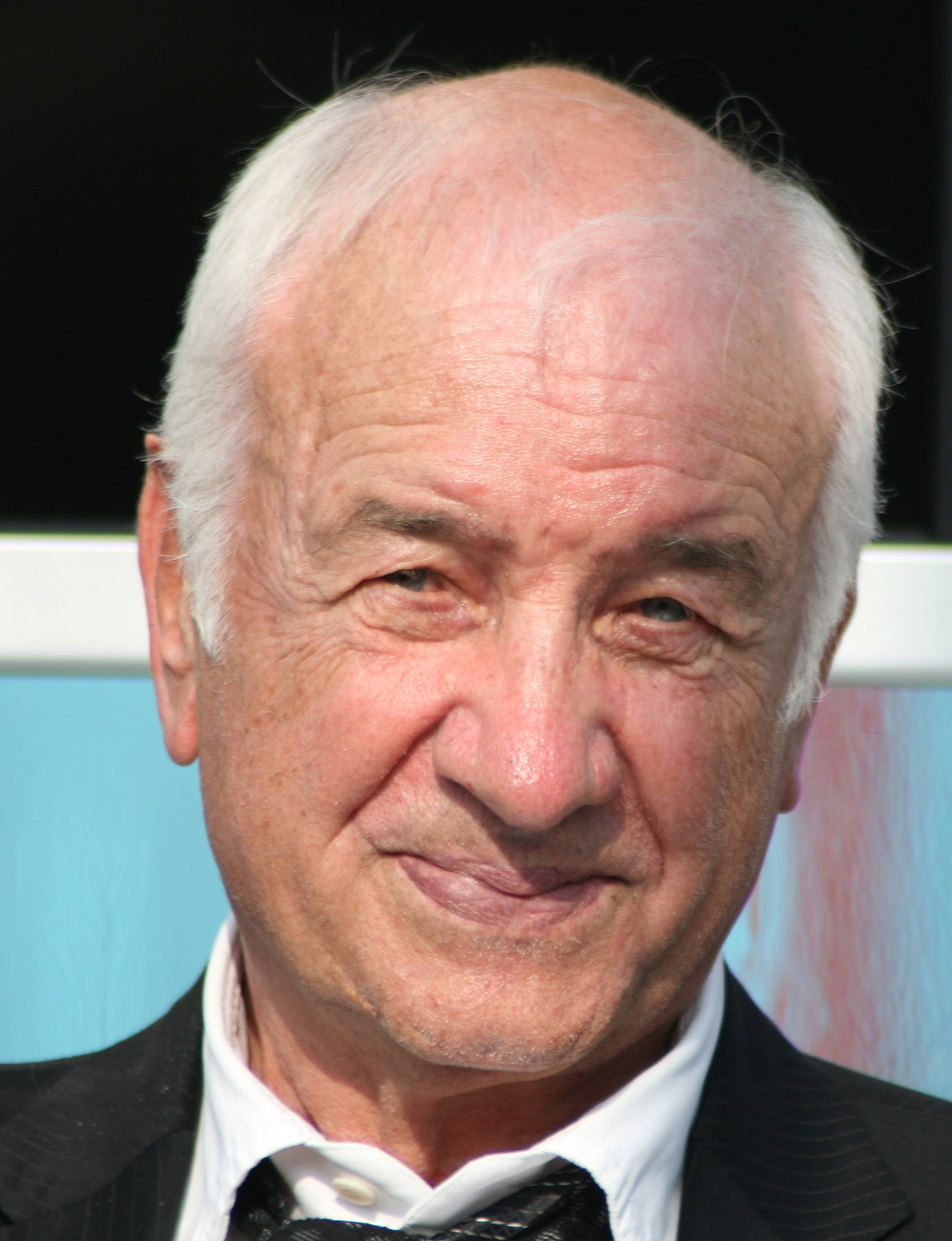
Armin Mueller-Stahl, 2007

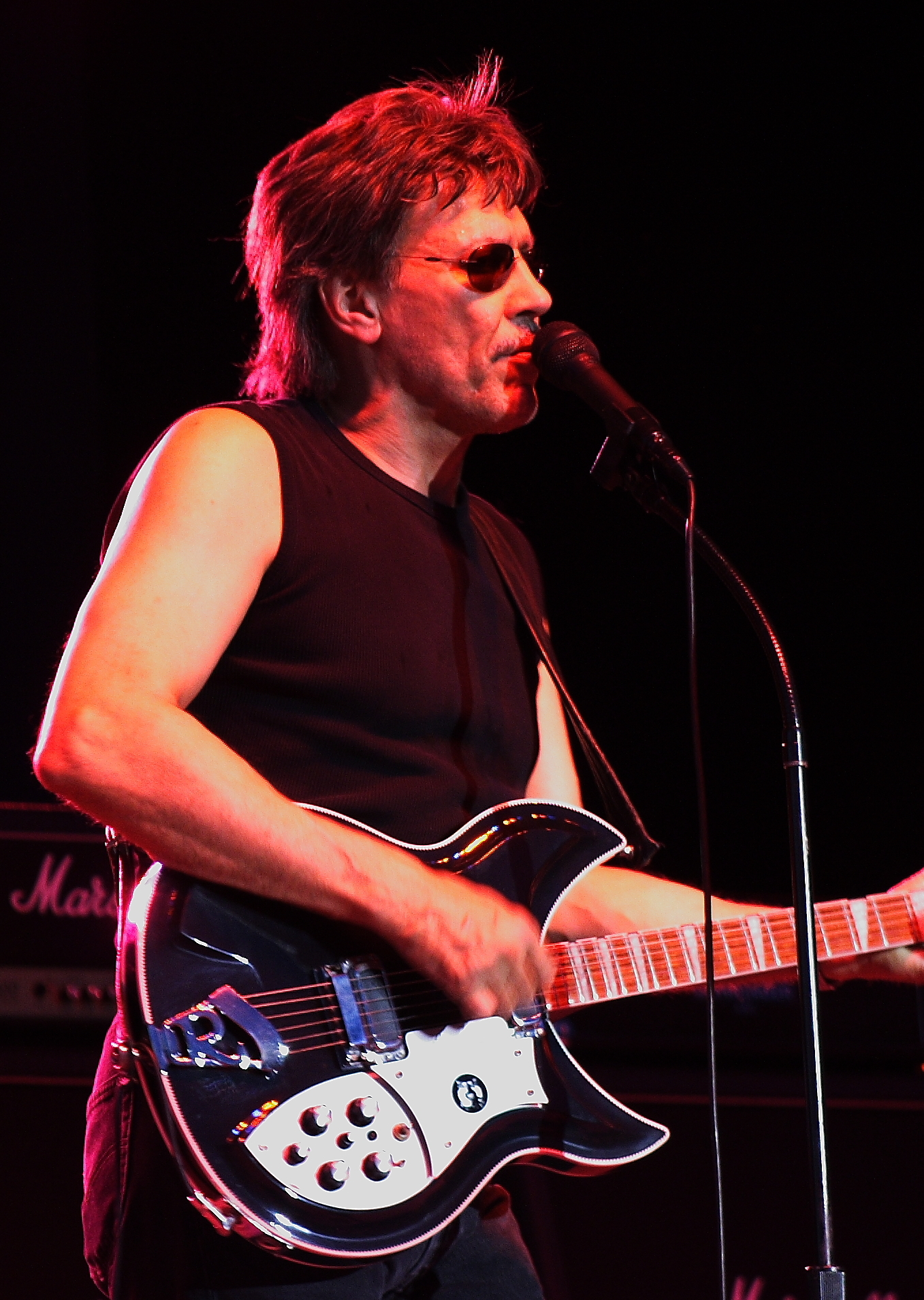
John Kay, 2007

- Daniel Klein (1609–1666), Lithuanian pastor and grammarian
- Johann Christian Jacobi (1719–1784), German oboist
- Max von Schenkendorf (1783–1817), German poet and author
- Franz Meyen (1804–1840), German botanist
- Hans Victor von Unruh (1806–1886), German politician and technician
- Louis Kolitz (1845–1912), German artist
- Wilhelm Voigt (1849–1922), the inspiration for The Captain of Köpenick
- Margarete Poehlmann (1856–1923), German educator and politician, first woman to speak in a Prussian parliament
- Gustaf Kossinna or Kossina (1858–1931), archaeologist
- Johanna Wolff (1858–1943), German author
- Oscar Friedheim (1858–1928), British businessman of German-Jewish descent
- Max Scherwinsky (1859–1909) German-born architect working mainly in Riga, Latvia
- Emil Wiechert (1861–1928), German geophysicist
- Raphael Friedeberg (1863–1940), German physician and politician
- Max Gülstorff (1882–1947), German actor
- Carl Brinkmann (1885–1954), German sociologist and economist
- Franz Scheidies (1890–1942) general in the Wehrmacht during WWII
- Walter Weiß (1890–1967), German general during WWII
- Friedrich Schröder Sonnenstern (1892–1982), illustrator
- Dick Shikat (1897–1968) German professional wrestler and World Heavyweight Champion
- Frank Wisbar (1899–1967) German director
- Karl Hermann Martell (1906–1966), German actor
- Franz Abromeit (1907–1964), SS officer, Reichssicherheitshauptamt (Judenreferent)
- Joachim Sadrozinski (1907–1944), officer and resistance fighter
- Erna Dorn (1911–1953) victim of injustice in the German Democratic Republic
- Siegfried Graetschus (1916–1943), SS-Oberscharführer, killed during revolt in Sobibor extermination camp
- Johannes Bobrowski (1917–1965), German writer
- Werner Abrolat (1924–1997), German actor
- Gunter Wyszecki (1925–1985), German-Canadian physicist
- Armin Mueller-Stahl (born 1930), German actor, honorary citizen since 8 December 2011
- Sabine Bethmann (1931–2021), German actress
- Jürgen Kurbjuhn (1940–2014), football player
- Klaus-Dieter Sieloff (1942–2011), football player
- John Kay (born 1944), lead singer of the late 1960s rock band Steppenwolf
- Edgar Froese (1944–2015), German founder and leader of the electronic music group Tangerine Dream
- Victor Ivrii (born 1949) a Soviet, Canadian mathematician
- Andrei Sosnitskiy (born 1962) a Belarusian professional football coach and a former player

== Popular culture ==
The town is the location of a scene in Leo Tolstoy's War and Peace (Book Two Part Two Chapter 21). Tilsit is the setting for part of the 1939 film The Journey to Tilsit, which is based on a 1917 novella of the same name written by Hermann Sudermann.
