= Johanna Wolff =

German writer (1858–1943)

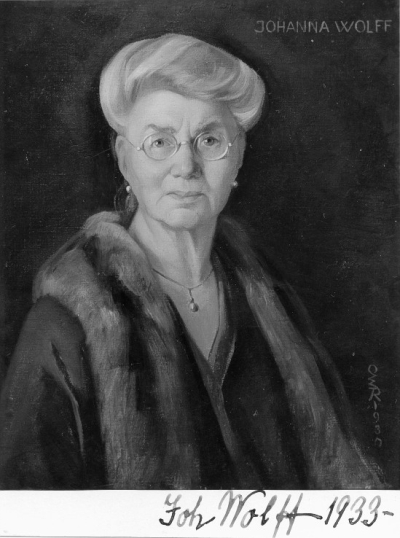
- German writer
- Born: Kielich; 30 January 1858; Tilsit, Prussia
- Died: 3 May 1943 (aged 85); Orselina, Switzerland
- Occupation: Writer

Johanna Wolff, née Kielich (30 January 1858 – 3 May 1943) was a popular German writer.

== Life ==
Johanna, the daughter of Adolf Kielich by his marriage to Caroline Lukoschewitz, was orphaned at the age of seven. With the support of Father Urbschat, a preacher of the Mucher movement, she received a formal training as a nursery nurse. She worked from 1877 as a deaconess and from 1887 as a Red Cross Sister in Hamburg, and later in Vienna. In 1897 she married Otto Gustav Wolff in Hamburg.

With Agnes Miegel she was an important figure of East Prussian women's literature. She was influenced by the works of Friedrich Nietzsche, Detlev von Liliencron and Richard Dehmel. Johanna Wolff's first published work was Namenlos - Frauenlieder in 1896 during her time in Vienna. Her most successful work was the autobiographical novel Hanneken: Ein Buch der Armut und Arbeit (1912). Until 1939 she published numerous poetry books, plays and novels.

In 1930 Johanna Wolff received the honorary citizenship of Tilsit and in 1943 the Meerwischer Elementary School in Tilsit was named after her and still honors Johanna Wolff today.

== Works ==
- 1896 Namenlos - Frauenlieder (Verlag der Wiener Mode, Vienna)
- 1899 Ahasver (102 pages, Verlag des Dramaturgischen Instituts Abteilung III (E. Ebering), Co-Author: O. Gustav Wolff
- 1907 Du schönes Leben: Dichtungen (Berlin: Schuster & Loeffler, Berlin, 144 p.)
- 1912 Die Meisterin: Schauspiel in vier Akten (Schuster & Loessler, Berlin, 78 p.)
- 1912 Das Hanneken: Ein Buch von Arbeit und Aufstieg (Rütten & Löning, Frankfurt a.M.)
- 1917 Von Mensch zu Mensch: Gedichte (Rütten & Löning, Frankfurt a.M.)
- 1918 Du schönes Leben: Gedichte (Schuster & Loeffler, Berlin)
- 1918 Schwiegermütter: Kleine Geschichten (J. G. Cotta Nachf., Stuttgart)
- 1919 Die Töchter Sauls ((J. G. Cotta Nachf., Stuttgart, 150 p.)
- 1920 Die Totengräberin (deutsche Dichter-Gedächnis-Stiftung, Hamburg Großborstel)
- 1921 Hans Peter Kromm der Lebendige: Eine Geschichte von Ufer zu Ufer (Schuster & Loeffler, Berlin)
- 1922 Drei Märchen von Ernst Moritz Arndt - 3 Holzschnitte von Johanna Wolff (F. L. Habbel, * Regensburg)
- 1924 Ganz verwaist (Julius Beltz, Langensalza)
- 1926 Der liebe Gott auf Urlaub: Zeitlose Legenden (Georg Müller, Munich, 236 pp.)
- 1929 Sonnenvögel (H. Schaffstein, Cologne)
- 1929 Grüne Märchen (H. Schaffstein, Cologne)
- 1930 Frauen zwischen gestern und heute: Lebensstücke (Deutsche Verlags-Anstalt, Stuttgart, 359 pp.)
- 1930 Ruhe ein wenig (Julius Beltz, Langensalza)
- 1930 Die Grabe-Dore (H. Eichblatt, Leipzig)
- 1930 Notturno, in Literarische Beilage Nr. 10 der Ostdeutschen Monatshefte (G. Stilke, Danzig)
- 1931 Lebendige Spur: Gedichte (Deutsche Verlags-Anstalt, Stuttgart)
- 1931 Die Totengräberin (Hillger, Berlin)
- 1932 Die Beichte (Heyer, Berlin)
- 1932 Mutter Trapp (H. Eichblatt, Leipzig)
- 1933 Andres Verlaten (H. Wollermann, Brunswick, 287 pp.)
- 1935 Hannekens Große Fahrt (Gräfe und Unzer, Königsberg, 356 p.)
- 1935 Wir bleiben jung - eine heitere Hanseatengeschichte (Gräfe und Unzer, Königsberg)
- 1936 Das Wunderbare: Eine Geschichte von Seelen und Geigen (Gräfe und Unzer, Königsberg)
- 1937 Ein bißchen Freude (Gräfe und Unzer, Königsberg)
- 1937 Der Fischpastor: Aus dem Merkbüchlein des Pfarrers Ulrich Drossel (Gräfe und Unzer, Königsberg)
- 1938 Vogelreuthers Mühle (Steuben Verlag P.G. Esser, Berlin, 214 p.)
- 1939 Wanderer wir: Ausgewählte Gedichte (Gräfe und Unzer, Königsberg, 143 pp.)
- 1940 Mutter auf Erden (Gräfe und Unzer, Königsberg)
