= Grauden forest =

The Grauden was a jungle between Pregola and Neman in what is now the Kaliningrad Oblast.

The forest consisted of oaks, alders, birches and dense, thorny underbrush. It was traversed by the courses of the Ossat, Schillup, Budup and Arge.

Johannes Voigt writes in Geschichte Preussens, von den ältesten Zeiten bis zum Untergang der Herrschaft des Deutschen Ordens (History of Prussia: from the earliest times to the downfall of the Teutonic Order), volume 4, page 38, that at the beginning of the year 1289 Meinhard von Querfurt, Country Master of Prussia of the Teutonic Order, gathered all the military force of the country. "On 11 January he moved with the army under great difficulties on the unblazed trails of the bleak forest wilderness which at that time was called the Grauden to Schalauen."

In 1377 Marshal Gottfried von Linden crossed the Grauden with Duke Albrecht III of Austria and his army of 30,000 men on their way back from Ragnit to Königsberg. Peter Suchenwirt, who accompanied Duke Albrecht III, described it as an almost impenetrable wilderness.

In his travel report of 1384 the chronicler Wiegand von Marburg writes about the road no. 43 of the Teutonic Order which was the first regular road through the Grauden from Insterburg to Kraupischken and on to Ragnit.

== Further links ==
- http://www.tilsit-ragnit.de/download/koenigskirch_kspchronik1a.pdf
- https://docs.google.com/viewer?a=v&q=cache:fu3YQVrgWT0J:www.tilsit-ragnit.de/download/koenigskirch_kspchronik1a.pdf+Graudenwald&hl=en&gl=de&pid=bl&srcid=ADGEESgnKMa1hJPSn2RNR4bOl0wHDVZspFxVeiKu8ijV-DmG8_R7WEjeXqrJTTgRyHxMJQTeL6QOTVAFtVqNy0Ph15QJ3C_7dElNZ98hfrWVwMIgaCnUTuaPzjPZ6AsDGZBxdxBqMR1F&sig=AHIEtbQF4TmXfldAHD7r7Oi6FmibfO4RUA
