= Margarete Poehlmann =

German politician and educator

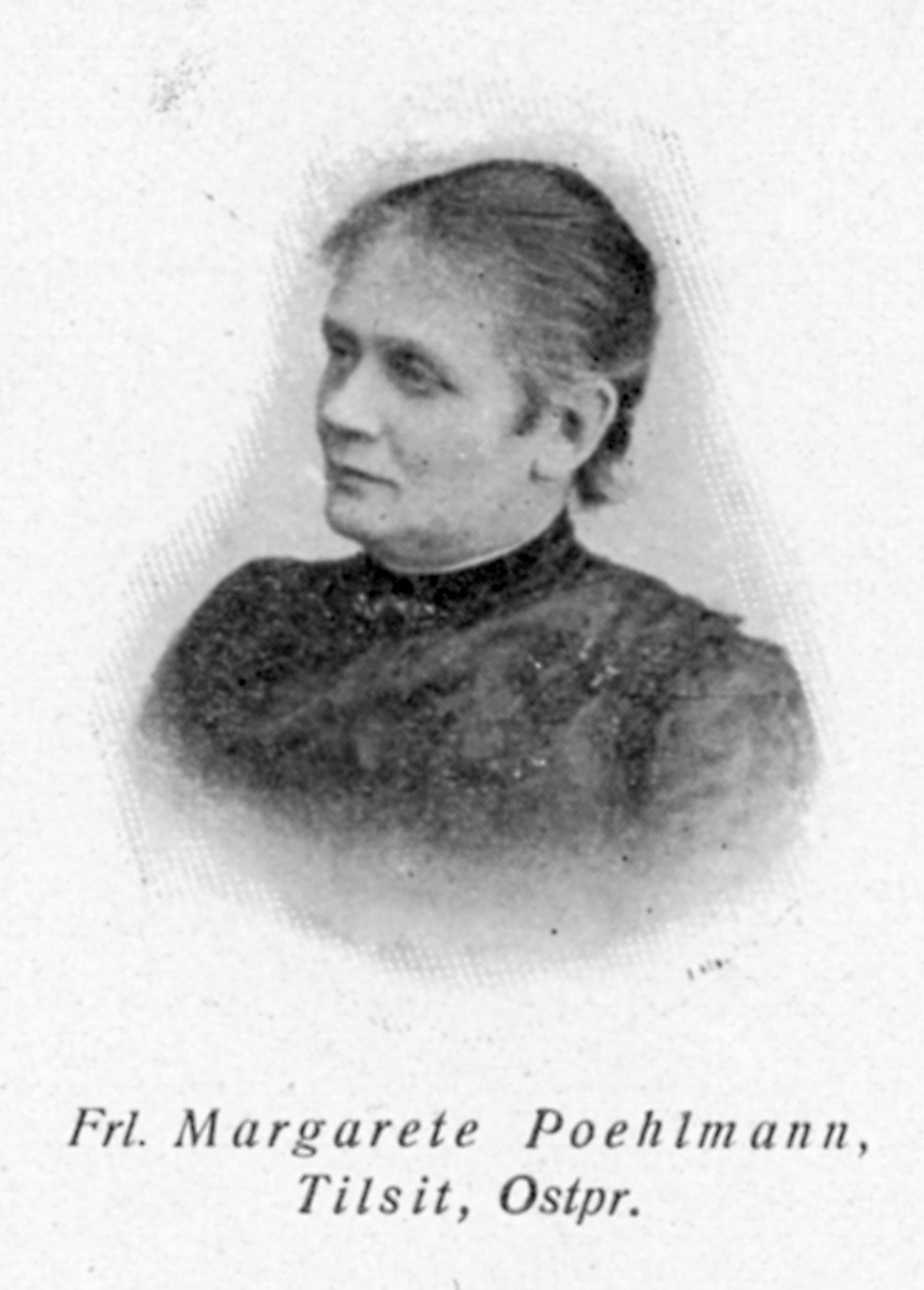
- Poehlmann in 1904

Member of the Landtag of Prussia
- In office 26 January 1919 – 25 December 1923

Personal details
- Born: Viktoria Margarete Poehlmann; 29 June 1856 Tilsit, Province of Prussia, Prussia
- Died: 25 December 1923 (aged 67) Tilsit, East Prussia, German Empire
- Party: German People's Party

Viktoria Margarete Poehlmann (29 June 1856 – 25 December 1923) was a German educator and politician.

Poehlmann was born in Tilsit, Kingdom of Prussia. She became a teacher, founding a private school for girls in 1888, which she led as headmistress until 1920. She was a prominent figure in the German Women's Movement during the German Empire. She led the East Prussian federation of Women's Associations. At the end of World War I, she joined the German People's Party (Deutsche Volkspartei, or DVP). In the elections for the Prussian Constitutional Convention, the first time women were allowed to vote, she gained a seat in parliament. She retained her seat in 1921 and was a member of the Prussian Landtag until her death in 1923.

== Early life and family ==
Margarete Poehlmann was born on 29 June 1856 in Tilsit, which at the time was part of the Prussian province of East Prussia. Her father was a professor. She had a brother, who died in his youth. Poehlmann visited a higher girls' school, followed by further education at a teacher's college. She made educational trips to both England and France before entering school service.

Poehlmann never married. In 1876, she started working as a teacher at the Höhere Mädchenschule in Tilsit, while at the same time caring for her ill parents.

== Headmistress and leader in the women's movement ==
As public schools did not grant the leading position she demanded to women, Poehlmann founded her own private girls' school in 1888, the Höhere Privat-Mädchenschule. She served as headmistress here until 1920. In 1909, the school took her name, being known from then on as Margarete-Poehlmann-Schule. On 1 October 1920, it was transformed into a public institution.

Poehlmann continued her own education as well, making extended visits to England, Switzerland and Russia. During several stays in Berlin, she visited lectures at Friedrich Wilhelm University, including some held by Ernst Troeltsch.

At the beginning of the twentieth century, Poehlmann began to work in the Women's Rights Movement. From 1906 until 1919, she served as a member of the board of the Allgemeiner Deutscher Lehrerinnenverein (General German Association of Female Teachers), which included consulting the Prussian State Government during a reform of girls' schools. Until her death, she was the chairwoman of the Federation of East Prussian Women's Associations (Verband Ostpreußischer Frauenvereine), which she founded and included 25 associations with a total of more than 5,000 members. The focus of her work was not suffrage, but education for girls and women, a topic on which she wrote numerous books and articles. In Tilsit, she ran a successful career consultation office for young women.

== Politics ==
At the end of World War I, Poehlmann became a member of the newly-founded German People's Party (Deutsche Volkspartei, or DVP). On 26 January 1919, the elections for the Prussian Constitutional Convention were held, the first in which women were allowed to vote and be elected. She won the election in the electoral district of Ostpreußen 1, gaining a seat in parliament.

On 19 March 1919, Poehlmann became the first elected woman to hold a speech in a Prussian parliament. Although the topic of the debate was the arrest of two members of the diet in Poland, Poehlmann took the opportunity to point out the historic moment:

[...] that for the first time, a woman speaks in this house as a representative of the Prussian people. This is fulfilment for all of us, who we have for a long time, for more than a human's age the oldest of us, stood in the fight for the equality of women.

In her speech, she also expressed disappointment in the fact that women's suffrage had to be achieved through revolution instead of a sincere acceptance of women's achievements.

Poehlmann fought for equality in language as well. At the time of her election, it was still customary to address an unmarried woman as Fräulein instead of Frau (equivalent to the English Mrs. and Ms.). Due to pressure by Poehlmann and others, this was changed in official guidelines from the Prussian Ministry of the Interior. In a speech on 27 November 1920, she also demanded that the descriptions of titles in public administrations would no longer be used in just the male form (e.g. Rätin as opposed to Rat). This demand was however not met.

In parliament, Poehlmann was a member of the committees on culture, Bevölkerungspolitik and Ostmarkfragen (concerning the easternmost parts of Prussia, mainly the Province of Posen). She was re-elected via her party's electoral list when the first Landtag of Prussia was elected in 1921 and remained a member of parliament until her death.

== Death and legacy ==
Poehlmann died on 25 December 1923 in her home town of Tilsit. In an obituary, the women's rights activist Else Frobenius honoured Poehlmann as "a woman, who has brought the modern parliamentarian respect and recognition".

== Bibliography ==
- von Hindenburg, Barbara (2017a). Die Abgeordneten des Preußischen Landtags 1919–1933. Biographie – Herkunft – Geschlecht (in German). Frankfurt am Main: Peter Lang. ISBN 978-3-631-67651-6.
- von Hindenburg, Barbara, ed. (2017b). Biographisches Handbuch der Abgeordneten des Preußischen Landtags. Verfassungsgebende Preußische Landesversammlung und Preußischer Landtag 1919–1933. Teil 3 (in German). Frankfurt am Main: Peter Lang. ISBN 978-3-631-67652-3.
