= Max von Schenkendorf =

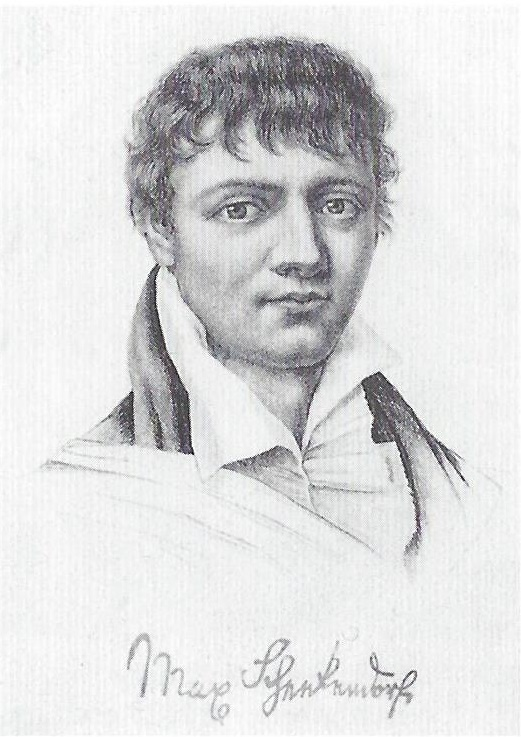
Max von Schenkendorf

Gottlob Ferdinand Maximilian Gottfried von Schenkendorf (11 December 1783 in Tilsit in East Prussia – 11 December 1817 in Koblenz) was a German poet, born in Tilsit and educated at Königsberg. During the War of Liberation, in which he took an active part, Schenkendorf was associated with Arndt and Körner in the writing of patriotic songs. His poems were published as Gedichte (1815), Poetischer Nachlass (1832), and Sämtliche Gedichte (1837; fifth edition, 1878). Some of his poems were set to music by lieder composer Pauline Volkstein. For his Life, consult Hagen (Berlin, 1863); Knaake (Tilsit, 1890); E. von Klein, M. von Schenkendorf (Vienna, 1908).

== Gallery ==
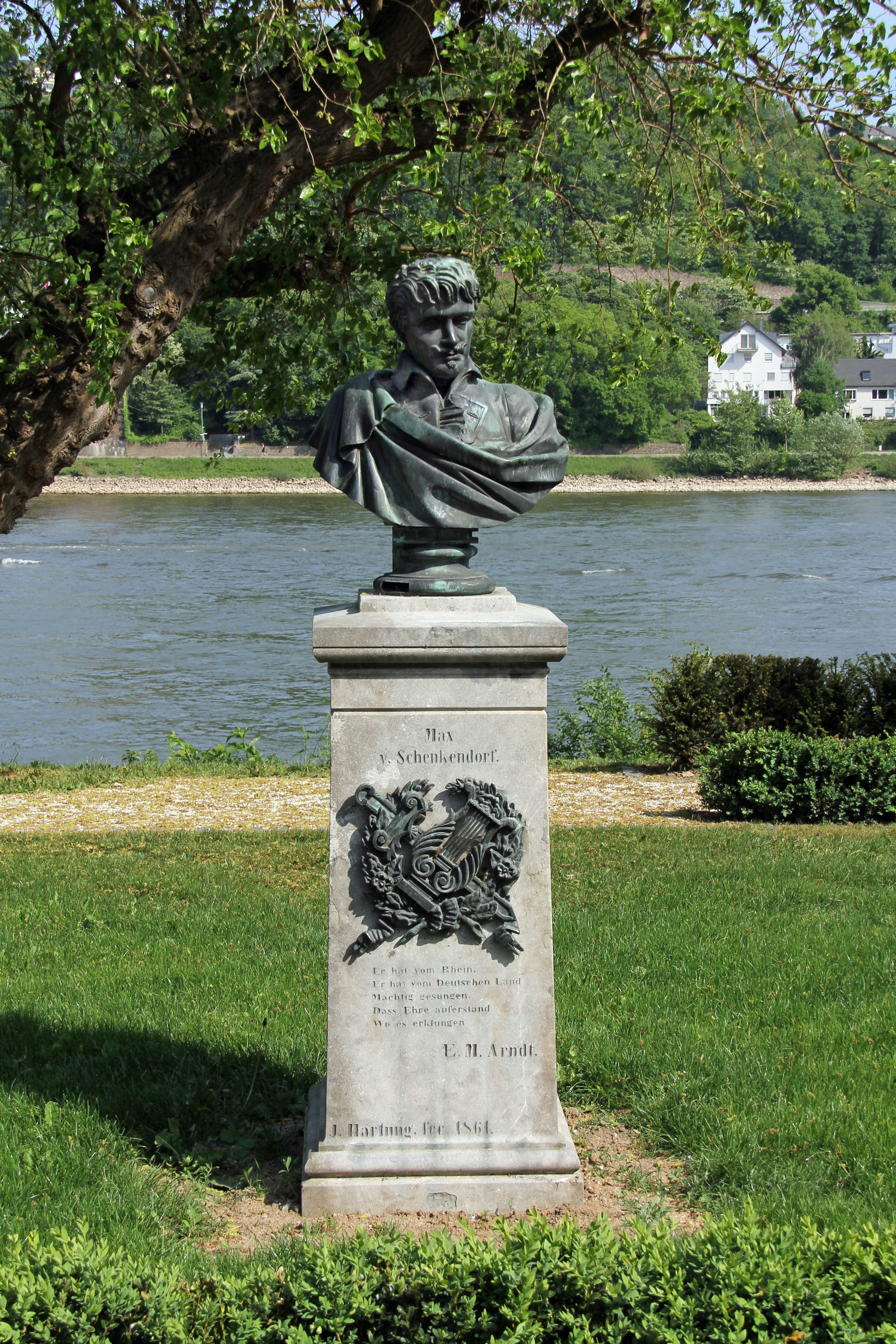
Bust of Max von Schenkendorf in Koblenz

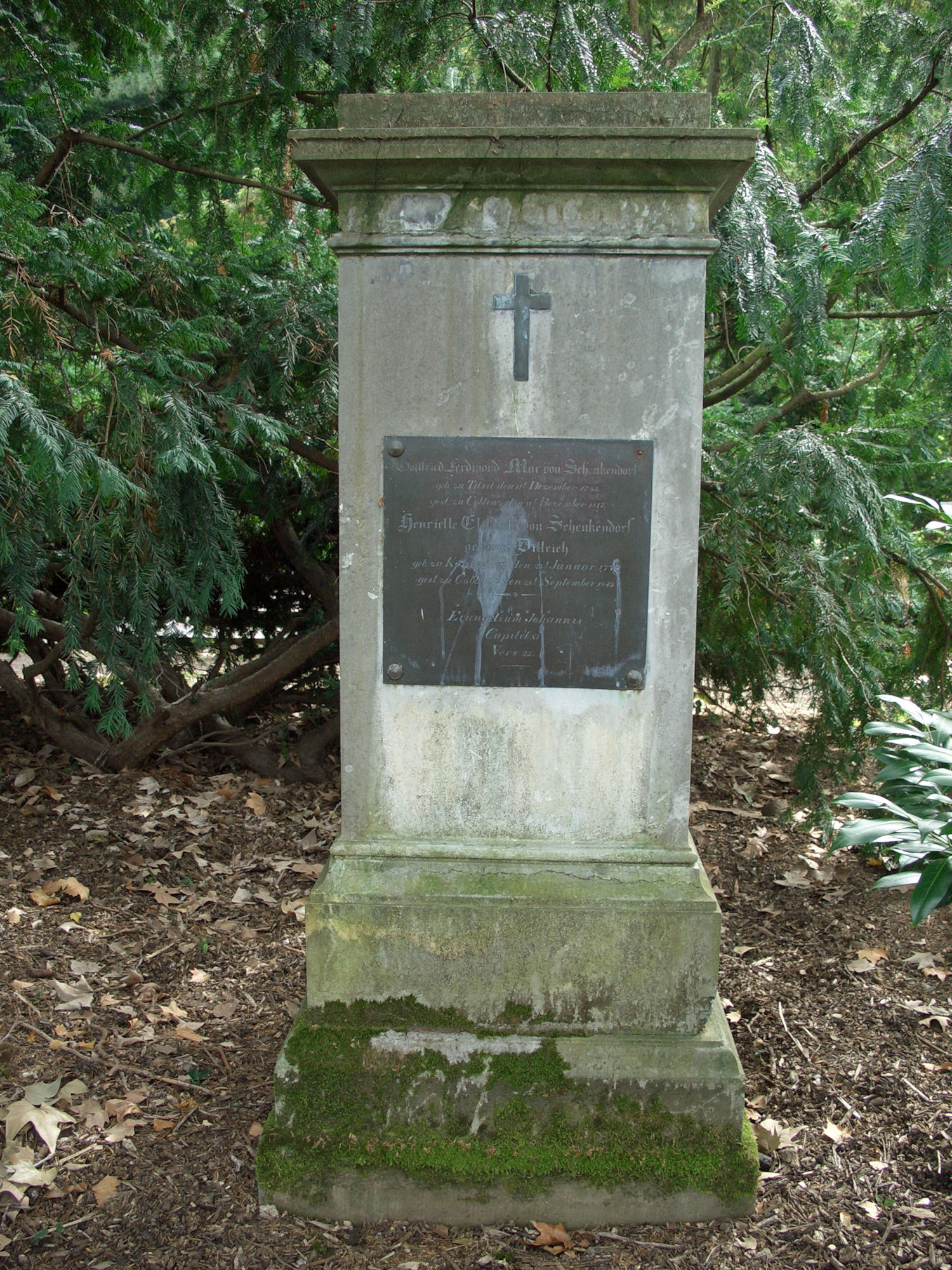
Tomb of Max von Schenkendorf at the cemetery of Koblenz

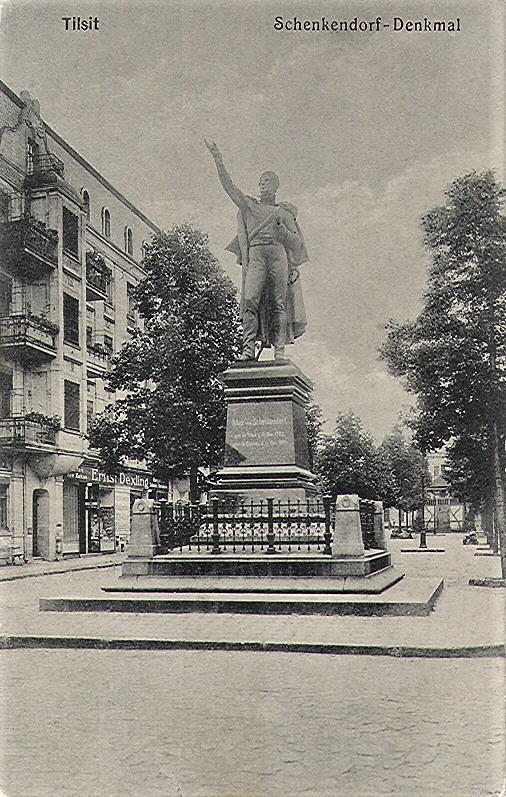
Schenkendorf Monument on Schenkendorfplatz, Tilsit. It was dismantled and then lost during and after World War II. A statue of Lenin was erected in its place by the Soviet authorities in 1967.
