= Carl Brinkmann =

German sociologist and economist

Carl Brinkmann (19 March 1885 – 20 May 1954) was a German sociologist and economist who focused on socioeconomics and the history of political economy.

Brinkmann was born in Tilsit, East Prussia, now in Kaliningrad, and died in Oberstdorf, Allgäu. In 1904 he was awarded a Rhodes Scholarship to study at The Queen's College, Oxford. He taught as a professor at the Heidelberg University (1923), Berlin University (1942), and Tübingen University (1946).

== Literary works ==
- Weltpolitik und Weltwirtschaft im 19. Jahrhundert, 1921
- Englische Geschichte, 1815–1914, ^{2}1936
- Wirtschaftsformen und Lebensformen, 1944
- Soziologische Theorie der Revolution, 1948
- Wirtschaftstheorie, 1948
