= Peter Suchenwirt =

Austrian poet and herald

Peter Suchenwirt (c. 1320 – 1395) was an Austrian poet and herald. (Suchenwirt was the Medieval name for heralds of the Austrian dukes.)

He called himself "Knappe von den Wappen" which is a lower position as to the herald, with the duty to blazon and explain the arms of the nobles.

Suchenwirt was the most outstanding representative of the so-called arms poetry (de: Heroldsdichtung). Since 1372 he lived in the Vienna court of the Austrian dukes. In 1377, he joined the campaign of duke Albrecht III to Prussia. His poems are full of heraldic blazon, documenting his proficiency in heraldic terminology.

Suchenwirt collected the material for his poems from the primary sources. For this reason he travelled a lot to the eminent personalities of his age. He was an outstanding observer, so his historical and cultural data proved to be authentic. He went to the location to give a laudation if he learnt about the death of an important person, or appeared there at the first anniversary of his death. He praised the tournament results, the virtues and field deeds of kings and nobles. As a rule, the speech ended with the description of the deceased person's arms.

He used gemstones to designate the tinctures, and to describe (c. 1355) the coat of arms of the Louis the Great (1342–1382), King of Hungary.

== See also ==
- Tricking (heraldry)
