= Lithuanian grammar =

Grammatical rules of the Lithuanian language

Lithuanian grammar has a highly inflectional morphology. Its nouns are inflected for numbers and cases. Its verbs are inflected for person, tense-aspect-mood, and voice. In additional, both its nouns and verbs have multiple inflectional classes.

Many linguists consider lithuanian grammar to be highly conservative. Compared to other modern descendents of Proto-Indo-European, Lithuanian preserves relatively more grammatical features and markers from their common ancestor.

== Properties and morphological categories ==
=== Grammatical terminology ===
Category	Language	
Category	Lithuanian	English
Parts of speech	daiktavardis	noun
Parts of speech	būdvardis	adjective
Parts of speech	veiksmažodis	verb
Parts of speech	skaitvardis	numeral
Parts of speech	įvardis	pronoun
Parts of speech	prieveiksmis	adverb
Parts of speech	dalelytė	particle
Parts of speech	prielinksnis	preposition
Parts of speech	jungtukas	conjunction
Parts of speech	jaustukas	interjection
Parts of speech	ištiktukas	verbal interjection
Main cases (liñksniai)	vardininkas	nominative
Main cases (liñksniai)	kilmininkas	genitive
Main cases (liñksniai)	naudininkas	dative
Main cases (liñksniai)	galininkas	accusative
Main cases (liñksniai)	įnagininkas	instrumental
Main cases (liñksniai)	vietininkas	inessive
Main cases (liñksniai)	šauksmininkas	vocative
Locative cases	iliatyvas, kryptininkas	illative
Locative cases	aliatyvas	allative
Locative cases	adesyvas	adessive
Number (skai̇̃čiai)	vienaskaita	singular
Number (skai̇̃čiai)	dviskaita	dual
Number (skai̇̃čiai)	daugiskaita	plural
Degrees of comparison (láipsniai)	nelyginamasis	positive
Degrees of comparison (láipsniai)	aukštesnysis	comparative
Degrees of comparison (láipsniai)	aukščiausiasis	superlative
Genders (gi̇̀minės)	vyriškoji	masculine
Genders (gi̇̀minės)	moteriškoji	feminine
Tenses (laikai̇̃)	esamasis	present
Tenses (laikai̇̃)	būtasis kartinis	past
Tenses (laikai̇̃)	būtasis dažninis	past iterative
Tenses (laikai̇̃)	būsimasis	future
Moods (núosakos)	tiesioginė	indicative
Moods (núosakos)	netiesioginė	indirect
Moods (núosakos)	tariamoji	conditional (subjunctive)
Moods (núosakos)	liepiamoji	imperative
Voices (rū́šys)	veikiamoji	active
Voices (rū́šys)	neveikiamoji	passive
Aspects (veikslai̇̃)	įvykio	perfective
Aspects (veikslai̇̃)	eigos	continuous, progressive

=== Gender ===
Lithuanian nouns are classified into one of two genders:

- masculine
- feminine

Lithuanian adjectives, numerals, pronouns and participles are classified into one of three genders:

- masculine
- feminine
- neuter

Since no noun can have a neutral gender, it is used with subjects of neutral or undefined gender:

- Ji (fem.) yra graži (fem.) – She is beautiful.
- Mokytojas (masc.) bus pasirengęs (masc.) – The teacher will be ready.
- Skaityti buvo įdomu (neuter) – Reading was interesting.

The gender of a pronoun kas – 'who? what?', personal pronouns aš / mes – 'I' / 'we', tu / jūs – 'you (singular) / you (plural)' and a reflexive pronoun savęs is indefinite, it means any of the genders. The word kas uses masculine inflections, the other pronouns have their own specific paradigm. The nouns of the indefinite gender have feminine form inflections.

The masculine gender is also the indeterminate gender as in many other Indo-European languages. This means that for an entire mixed group of objects belonging to masculine and feminine genders, the masculine gender is used. The masculine as the indeterminate gender differs from the indefinite gender, which allows treatment of the word in two ways.

Note that there are many nouns that use masculine or feminine genders without any reason of biological gender, for instance, words that denote inanimate objects. The masculine or feminine usage of these words is stable (with few exceptions) and doesn't depend on the will of a speaker.

Lithuanian grammatical genders are similar to, for instance, Latin:

nominative genitive	vilkas wolf vilko	kalba language kalbos	prekė commodity prekės	pilis castle pilies	viršus top viršaus	akmuo stone akmens	girdė́tas, girdė́ta, girdė́ta heard; gender sequence: m., f., n. girdė́to, girdė́tos from girdė́ti – to hear (continuing, imperfective action)	i̇̀šgirstas, išgirstà, i̇̀šgirsta heard i̇̀šgirsto, išgirstõs from išgir̃sti – to hear (one-time, perfective action)
nominative genitive	lupus wolf lupī	lingua language linguae	rēs thing reī	turris tower turris	frūctus fruit frūctūs	acūmen n. sharp point acūminis	audītus, audīta, audītum heard, listened; from audīre – to hear, listen audītī, audītae, audītī	

=== Grammatical number ===
The Lithuanian language has two main numbers, singular and plural. It has also a dual number, which is used in certain dialects, such as Samogitian. Some words in the standard language retain their dual forms (for example du ("two") and abu ("both"), an indefinite number and super-plural words (dauginiai žodžiai in Lithuanian). Dual forms of pronouns used in the standard language are also optional.

The singular number indicates that the denoted thing is one or indivisible (as in méilė – love, smė̃lis – sand, pi̇́enas – milk). The plural number, when it can be in contrast with the singular, indicates that there are many of the things denoted by the word. But sometimes, when a word doesn't have the singular number, being a plurale tantum noun, the plural form doesn't indicate real singularity or plurality of the denoted object(s).

Adjectives and numerals also have the singular-plural distinction. Their number depends on that of the noun they are attributed to.

The dual number indicates a pair of things. Historically, the dual number has been a full grammatical number, participating as the third element in singular–dual–plural distinction. During the last century, the dual was used more or less sporadically in Lithuanian, sometimes reaching the status of a full number for agreement purposes, meaning the dual of noun required dual agreement in its adjectives or the dual of the subject required the dual of the verb. But in many more cases the dual was reduced to a nominal category explicitly indicating a pair of things, but not requiring dual agreement of adjectives or verbs. Presently, the dual is mostly used as a declension paradigm for numbers du – two, abu – both (and a variant abudu – idem) and with personal pronouns aš – I, mùdu du. – we two (mẽs pl. – we) and tu sg. – you, jùdu du. – you two (jū̃s pl. – you).

dual				plural
present	past	future	imperative	present	past	future	imperative
ei̇̃nava – we two are going; we two go	ė̃jova	ei̇̃siva	ei̇̃kiva – let us two go	ei̇̃name	ė̃jome	ei̇̃sime	ei̇̃kime – let us go
ei̇̃nata – you two are going; you two go	ė̃jota	ei̇̃sita	ei̇̃kita – you two go	ei̇̃nate	ė̃jote	ei̇̃site	ei̇̃kite
				singular
				einù	ėjaũ	ei̇̃siu
				eini̇̀	ėjai̇̃	ei̇̃si	ei̇̃k – go

The indefinite number indicates that the same form of the word can be understood singular or plural, depending both on situation and on other words in the sentence. There are only few words that demonstrate indefinite number, and the indefinite number doesn't have its own forms in Lithuanian. These words are pronouns kas – 'who? what?', kažkas – 'something, somebody' and reflexive pronoun savęs. All of them use inflections of the singular.

The super-plural words are a few numbers and pronouns that indicate a counting not of separate things, but of groups of things.

keleri – 'several (groups of)'
abeji – 'both (groups of)'
(vieneri – 'one (group of)')
dveji – 'two (groups of)'
treji – 'three (groups of)'
ketveri – 'four (groups of)'
penkeri – 'five (groups of)'
šešeri – 'six (groups of)'
septyneri – 'seven (groups of)'
aštuoneri – 'eight (groups of)'
devyneri – 'nine (groups of)'

These words are also used with plurale tantum nouns instead of plural words (keli, abu, du, trys and so on), in which case they indicate not the plural of groups, but just the semantic plural or singular (a word vieneri – 'one' only) of the noun.

=== Cases of declined words ===
- Nominative – vardininkas
- Genitive – kilmininkas; it also functions similarly to the ablative case in other languages.
- Dative – naudininkas
- Accusative – galininkas
- Instrumental – įnagininkas
- Locative cases:

- Locative (inessive) – vietininkas
- Illative – (iliatyvas, sometimes referred as kryptininkas); dialectal, without clear status in the standard Lithuanian
- Allative; obsolete, the singular is reduced to adverbs
- Adessive; extinct

- Vocative – šauksmininkas

Examples of the locative cases:

- inessive is fully used locative case (and the only one of Indo-European origin, the following three being borrowed from Uralic). An example: nãmas – a house, namè – in a house, vyruose – in men. It is also used for a temporal meaning in some words: vakarè [vɐkɐrʲˈɛ] – in the evening (vãkaras [ˈväːkɐrɐs̪] nom. 'an evening'). But more nouns are used in accusative for the latter meaning: vãsarą – in summer, rùdenį – in autumn, trẽčią vãlandą – in three o'clock. This accusative form also means duration: trečią dieną kepina [ˈtʲrʲæːt͡ʃʲæː ˈdʲiən̪äː ˈkʲæːpʲɪn̪ɐ] (kepina is idiomatic or slang in such meaning) – it is the third day when it (sun) sizzles (its heat). Plural forms for temporal "locatives" are expressed by instrumental: vakarai̇̃s – in / by evenings, vãsaromis – in / by summers.
- illative is used sparingly. Some terms are normal, for example, in law: patráukti baudžiamõjon atsakomýbėn – to prosecute; literally: to draw, pull, move to penal amenability (not į (to) baudžiamają atsakomybę acc., not (for) baudžiamajai atsakomybei dative). Other examples: singular káiman – to(wards) the village, miškañ – to(wards) a forest, and forms of the common language į káimą, į mi̇̀šką; plural káimuos-na, miškúos-na and common forms į káimus, į miškùs;
- allative. Examples: namop – up to the home. Today it is used only in a few idiomic expressions like vakaróp – about nightfall, velnióp – to hell with smth.; šuniop – down the drain (about dog, to a dog); galóp – ultimately; nuteisti myriop – to send to the scaffold;
- adessive. Examples: lauki̇́e-p sg. – beside the field, at the field, nami̇́e-p sg.. It is a historical or dialectal case, extinct in modern standard Lithuanian, but it is preserved in the adverbs: namie – at home, netoli(e) – not far, toli(e) – far, arti(e) – nearby, vienaip ar kitaip – anyway, savaip – in one's own fashion/way, tavaip – in your (sg.) fashion/way, visaip – diversely. etc.

The later three locatives are adverb-forming cases.

== Nouns ==
Lithuanian grammar makes a distinction between proper and common nouns. Only proper nouns are capitalized. Some nouns, for example sun and moon, can be both proper and common. There are no articles in Lithuanian.

The genders of nouns are masculine and feminine. A rough rule of thumb is that almost all masculine nouns in nominative case end in -s and most feminine in -(i)a or -ė. There are no strict rules governing the gender. For example, upė – river, is feminine, but upelis – rivulet, is masculine. There is no neuter gender ("it gender"), but there are a few words that can be applied to both genders equally. They mostly describe people, have negative connotations, and end in -a, for example vė́pla – dummy, el̃geta – beggar, nakti̇̀balda – night-lumberer, a person who does not sleep at night, but mėmė̃ – gawk.

There are no separate declension paradigms for animate and inanimate nouns in Lithuanian.

=== Number ===
Most nouns have singular and plural numbers. There are some words that have only singular (e.g., pienas – milk, auksas – gold, gripas – flu, laimė – happiness) or only plural (e.g., lubos – ceiling, miltai – flour, kelnės – trousers) forms. Most such words are abstract (i.e., represent concepts like luck or love and not tangible things such as table or house), describe material or name a disease. However, in some instances, for example poetic language, it is possible to use singular nouns in plural form.

==== Noun modification by numeral ====
In Lithuanian the choice of form when a count noun is to be used in conjunction with a number depends on the final digits of the number in question. The distribution of number and case differs somewhat from the similar systems used in Slavic languages. This system stands in stark contrast to those of Romance and Germanic languages.

Number ends with	Form	Example
1 (excluding 11)	Singular	31 litas
2–9 (excluding 12–19)	Plural	25 litai
0 or 11–19	Special case: Singular + noun in plural genitive	110 litų 111 litų

Note: Plural or singular without the case means that the word or words can be declined in any case in plural or singular respectively, but plural genitive means that the second word remains undeclined.

=== Declension ===
Nouns in Lithuanian language have 12 declension paradigms, in scholar grammar corresponding to five declensions which are defined by the inflection in singular nominative and genitive cases. Only few borrowed words, like taksi̇̀ – taxi, kupė – compartment (in a train), coupe, are not subject to declension rules.

	Inflection in singular cases		Examples			Notes
	Nominative	Genitive	Nominative	Genitive	Meaning	Notes
I	-as, -is, -ys	-o	výras mẽdis traukinỹs kẽlias	výro mẽdžio tráukinio kẽlio	man, male; husband tree train road	Main pattern for masculine nouns.
II	-a, -i^{1}, -ė	-os, -ės	žmonà šviesà várna pradžià sáulė	žmonõs šviesõs várnos pradžiõs sáulės	wife light crow beginning sun	Main pattern for feminine nouns; few masculine exceptions.
III	-is^{2}	-ies	móteris^{3} f. pili̇̀s f. avi̇̀s f. danti̇̀s m.	móteries piliẽs aviẽs dantiẽs	woman, female castle sheep tooth	Rarer; feminine nouns; fewer masculine exceptions.
IV	-us	-aus	žmogùs sūnùs medùs skai̇̃čius	žmogaũs sūnaũs medaũs skai̇̃čiaus	man (human being) son honey number	Rare; masculine nouns.
V	-uo, -ė^{3}	-en-s, -er-s f.	vanduõ akmuõ skaitmuõ sesuõ duktė̃	vandeñs akmeñs skaitmeñs seser̃s dukter̃s	water stone digit sister daughter	Very rare; masculine nouns; four^{3} feminine; all are suffixed by -en- m. and -er- f..

1. There are only two nouns ending in -i: pati 'wife' and marti 'daughter-in-law'. Their declension is the same to the second adjective feminine declension and similar to a second feminine noun palatalized declension. The noun pati is the same to a pronoun pati 'herself; myself f.; itself (for feminine nouns)'
2. Exception: petys m. – shoulder, peties, etc., after this declensional pattern. The third declension is very similar to the fifth declension.
3. Duktė 'daughter' is the only word of the fifth declension, not having an ending uo. A word moteris 'woman, female' often has a genitive móters; the plural genitive of moteris is moterų (not palatalized -ių); it is the only normal form for the fifth declension and one of the two (the main is -ių) for the third. The more two words, obelis f. – apple tree and dieveris m. – (older) brother-in-law, are the same declensional case as moteris, but dieveris, being masculine possibly has a sg. inst. -iu. Dieveris is also the only -er- masculine case.

=== Typology ===
In the table below the numbers of nouns, received by the statistical analysis of the data in the Dictionary of contemporary Lithuanian language (Dabartinės Lietuvių kalbos žodynas; the fourth issue, 2000), are given grouped by the patterns of declension and accentuation. The data does not include verbal abstracts ending in -imas, -ymas, -umas (for instance, metimas 'a throwing; a throw' from mesti 'to throw'), 18,700 in total (12,000 of the first accentuation paradigm, 6,000 of the second), because they can be made from any verb. There may be some inaccuracies due to some specific features, for instance, there are homonyms which differ only in an accent: si̇́etas 1 – sieve (related to sijóti – to sieve), siẽtas 2 – tether, leash (related to siẽti – to tie, bond; sai̇̃tas – bond; leash), and the possibility exists that in some of such cases the two words were taken as one.

Words with a suffix -men-, are attributed to the third declensional pattern in these tables, but they are of the fifth, the singular (can be used for all, but is not usual for all) nom. is -uo: for example, ãšmenys pl. 3b – blade, sė́dmenys pl. 3a – buttocks, nates, sėdmuõ sg., nẽšmenys pl. 3b – silts, sediments carried by a water stream. The singular instrumental is -imi, like in the third declension, while for masculine words of the fifth declension the proper ending is chosen to be -iu; but -imi can also be chosen for the words of the fifth declension.

		1	2	3	3a	3b	34a	34b	4	alt.	all
-as		1907	3499	90	35	393	48	5	340	94	6411
-j-as		921	16						4		944
-ias		921	16	1					2		944
-is		3085	2188							22	5295
-ys				16	192	581	48	25	282	102	1246
-a	f.	1571	635	19	58	369	16	1	405	26	3100
-a	m.	1	11								12
-a	c	207	32	3	1	6			16	1	266
-j-a		1821	114			22			43	5	2005
-ia		1821	114			22			43	5	2005
-ė	f.	2668	2895	14	30	125	14	1	202	59	6008
-ė	m.		4								4
-ė	c	2	6			7			4		19
-is	f.	50	2	7	10	76	1		99	10	255
-is	m.	1	1	2	6	10		1	3	3	27
-is	c					3		1	1	3	8
-us			7	2					10		19
-j-us		184	314							1	504
-ius		2	314							1	504
-uo					23	38	1			1	63

The numbers in the upper row mean accentuation types. For the third type the additional information is given in dictionaries. The mark 3 without the letter added, is for words, stressed in the next-to-last syllable. The letter after is for polysyllabic words and says what type of stress the syllable has in those cases where the stress falls on the stem (other cases receive it on the ending) and how distant from the ending the syllable stressed is. The letter a is for a start-firm (tvirtapradė priegaidė) accent and the letter b – for an end-firm (tvirtagalė priegaidė) and short stressed vowel. The single digit with a letter means that the stress falls on the third syllable from the ending; if the stress falls on the fourth syllable from the ending, the mark is 34a or 34b, there are also nouns having stress in the fifth (35a, 35b) and sixth (36b) syllable from the ending. Here are a few examples of nouns of the third accentuation pattern, the singular nominative and the plural dative and accusative cases: akmuõ, akmeni̇̀ms, ãkmenis; áugalas, augaláms, áugalus; žándas, žandáms, žándus. The first declension also includes nouns stressed in a syllable more distant from the ending than the next-to-last, but their stress is steady throughout the cases and is always clear from the nominative singular.

In the left column the nominative singular endings of words, grouped by declensional paradigms, are given: -as, -is, -ys, -ias (masculine gender) – the first; -a (-ia), -ė (feminine gender; some other) – II; -is (feminine, some other) – III; -us (-ius) (masculine) – IV; -uo (masculine; two feminine) – V. The palatalized variants of -as, -a, -us types, that is, -ias, -ia, -ius, are counted together with those having -j- before the inflectional ending: -j-as, -j-a, -j-us.

The letters f., m., c. mean gender: f. – feminine, m. – masculine, c. – common (is understood as either of the genders). The column under the abbreviation alt. is for alternative forms, for instance, a word grobuonis 2, 3a c. – predator (of the third declension), can be accentuated in two types: (2) grobuõnis, grobuõnies, grobuõniui; (3a) grobuoni̇̀s, grobuoniẽs, gróbuoniui.

	-as	-j-as	-is	-ys	-ias
1.	výras – man, male, pienas – milk, skruostas – cheek	vė́jas – wind, šilójas – heather, ling; veikė́jas – character, actor, vartótojas – consumer	brólis – brother, sotis – satiety, gruodis – December, kūjis – hammer, dilbis – forearm, jautis – bull, ox, pojūtis – sense, sensation	–	élnias – deer (also accented el̃nias 2)
2.	sõdas – garden, metas – specific time (to do smth, for smth), padas – sole, metatarsus, ginklas – weapon, varžtas – screw, kuras – fuel	galvijas – cow (cattle); yahoo, šalavijas – salvia, sage	žõdis – word, skonis – taste, lygis – level, kelis – knee, medis – tree, valgis – dish, meal, karštis – heat	–	
3.	stógas – roof, óras – weather, žándas – face part down from cheekbone, kalnas – mountain, beržas – birch, aidas – echo, augalas – plant	–	–	arklỹs – horse, pavyzdỹs – example, obuolỹs – apple	(1) vélnias – devil
4.	krãštas – region; edge, strazdas – trush, ledas – ice, penas – food, pabulum, sniegas – snow, vardas – name, kulnas – heel, laikas – time, dugnas – bottom	(4) kraũjas – blood, pelėsiai̇̃ pl. – molds (fungi), kapojai̇̃ pl. – chaffed fodder, klijai̇̃ pl. – glue	–	kepsnỹs – roast, fry, genỹs – woodpecker, vabzdỹs – insect	(2) kẽlias – road, svẽčias – guest

	-a (-ia)	-ė
1.	vė́tra – windstorm, scud, pė́da 3 – foot, lova – bed, lūpa – lip, li̇́epa – linden, July; duona – bread, spurga – doughnut, kaina – price, koja – leg, pérėja – crosswalk, vartótoja – user	dróbė – linen, di̇̀ldė – rasp, nail file, kárvė – cow, pagálvė – pillow, vaivórykštė – rainbow, daržóvė – vegetable
2.	rankà – hand, arm, putà – froth, vietà – place, valià – will, galià – power	brãškė – strawberry, žẽmė – earth, prẽkė – commodity, piẽnė – sowthistle, vi̇̀rvė – rope, raidė (3, 4) – letter, ùpė – river, bi̇̀tė – bee, pùsė – side, half, striùkė – jacket
3.	galvà – head, burnà – mouth, pėdà 1 – foot, apačià – bottom, underpart	versmė̃ – fount, spring, varškė̃ – curd, aikštė̃ – square, plaza
4.	vėsà – chill, dienà – day, lentà – board, wood cut, dainà – song, pradžià – beginning	srovė̃ – stream, kėdė̃ – chair, dėžė̃ – box, vertė̃ – value, erdvė̃ – space, eilė̃ – queue, row

	-is	-uo	-us	-ius	-j-us
1.	nósis – nose, krósnis; masculine: (1) gẽležuonys pl. – adenitis equorum, strangle	rė́muo 1 (also rėmuo 3a) – waterbrash	there is one proper word: Jė́zus – Jesus	(2) ámžius – age, stálčius – drawer (furniture); there is also one proper word: Vi̇̀lnius	rytójus – tomorrow, kritèrijus – criterion
2.	dùrys pl. – door, gai̇̃štis – dallying; masculine: (1) pirmuõnys pl. (also deguõnis – oxygen; deguonis 3b is a rarer variant)	–	(7) Tur̃gus – market place, cùkrus – sugar	sõdžius – village, vai̇̃sius – fruit, bal̃džius – furniture maker	pavõjus – danger
3.	širdi̇̀s – heart, obeli̇̀s – apple tree, smegenys pl. – brain; masculine: (19) debesi̇̀s – cloud, žvėri̇̀s – beast	akmuõ – stone 3b, vanduõ – water 3a	(2) sūnùs – son, lietùs – rain	–	–
4.	nakti̇̀s – night, žuvi̇̀s – fish, sriti̇̀s – area, district, vini̇̀s – nail, spike, pirti̇̀s -, šali̇̀s, griñdys – floor, flooring; masculine: (3) danti̇̀s – tooth, petỹs – shoulder, ropuoni̇̀s – reptile (used word is roplỹs 4)	(1) šuõ – dog	(10) medùs, alùs, viršùs, vidùs, piẽtūs pl. – dinner; the south	–	–

The first declension, -as, -is, -ys, -ias.

- Names of -as type have vocative -ai instead of -e of common nouns: Jõnas – Jõnai, Tòmas – Tòmai. Common nouns sometimes have this ending, it is usual for a word tė́vas: tė́vai and tė́ve.
- Words having -j- before the ending -as (vė́jas – wind, naudótojas – user) have two differences of declensional cases from other -as words; -j- is soft sound and the locative for these words is like in soft -is / -ys / -ias type (mẽdyje, kepsnyjè, kelyjè), but with a vowel changed where needed for an easier pronunciation: vė́jyje, but naudótojuje. Vocative is also different: vėjau, naudótojau (naudotoje would sound the same as naudótoja, which is feminine (nominative and vocative) form of the same word. The vocative is similar for -as m. and -ė f. words: ą́žuolas – oak : ą́žuole and ẽglė – spruce : ẽgle). This form is sometimes present in other cases: nom. brólis : voc. bróli and brolaũ, vélnias : vélniau. Many of these -j- words are made with an actors (personal, not for things) suffix -ėjas m., -ėja f., -t-ojas m., -t-oja f.: vei̇̃kti 'to act, affect; operate' – veikė́jas 'actor, character'; naudóti 'to use' – naudótojas 'user'.
- There are only a few -ias words, they are declined like -ys words, except some cases: nominative for kẽlias, nominative and vocative for elnias – elni, and vélnias – vélniau.
- -is and -ys words differ in that -is words (with the short i sound) are stressed on the stem (I, II accentuation patterns) and -ys words (with the same sound, but long) are stressed on the ending (III, IV accentuation patterns). In the -is type almost half of the nouns have consonants t, d in the stem ending. These consonants change when palatalized: mẽdis nom. – mẽdžio gen. etc. (in the -as paradigm, on the other hand, there are no cases with palatalization: vardas – vardo etc.). In the -ys type about 12% of nouns have t, d as stem ending.

The second, -a (-ia), -ė (gen. sg. -ės)

- a type; twelve nouns are of masculine gender: viršilà 2 – warrant-officer, sergeant, barzdylà 2 – bearded one (person) (gen. barzdỹlos; it can also be heard barzdýla 1, barzdýlos; this is either a mistake and outcome of nivellation of accents or a type of word formation without changing an accent, compare adjectives, for example, ausýlas m., -a f. 'sharp-eard'), vaivadà – voivode (historical office) (it is attributed to be of the 2 accentuation type in vocabularies, but it is of 3 or 1 if used in language: vaivadà 3, dat. vai̇̃vadai or vai̇̃vada 1), maršálka 1 – historical office: mareschalus, marshal. 265 – of common gender: mušeikà 2 (1) – scrapper, bruiser, personà 2 – personage, nebrendilà 2 – immaturely behaving person (in language can also be heard nebrendýla 1, nebrendylà 2), nekláužada 1 – tinker (kid), nami̇̀sėda 1 – home-keeping, who sits at home. Two words have -i ending: marti̇̀ 4 – daughter-in-law, pati̇̀ 4 – wife (more like older).
- ė type; four nouns are masculine: dė̃dė 2 – uncle, tė̃tė 2 (more used or equal variant is tė̃tis 2) – dad, daili̇̀dė 2 – carpenter, woodworker and ciùcė 2 – doggy (in kid speech). 19 words are of common gender: garsenýbė 1 – renowned (person, thing), tauškalỹnė 2 – wind-bag, gasser, mėmė̃ 4 – gawk, spiegėlė̃ 3b – who shrieks too much (the latter word, for example, is not very likely to be heard, a word spieglỹs, -ė̃ 4 would probably occur). The t, d stems in -ė are present in the following percentage through the four accentuation paradigms: I – 15%, II – 35%, III – 23%, IV – 12%.

The third, -is

- There were 245 feminine and 24 masculine nouns in this class. 6 nouns have common gender: (the first three can also be attributed to masculine gender) palikuõnis 2, 34b 'progeny, offspring', grobuõnis 2, 3a 'predator', žiniuõnis 2, 4 'knower; witchdoctor', delsuoni̇̀s 3b 'who is dallying', giežuoni̇̀s 3b 'tiresome, sour (person)', vagi̇̀s 4 'thief'. Some other -uonis words are attributed to a masculine gender, for example, geluoni̇̀s 3b (2) – sting, deguõnis 2 (3b) (here in the table given as 3b, while 2 accentuation pattern is probably more used) – oxygen. A word vini̇̀s f., c. 4 'nail, spike' is also sometimes understood as of common gender. The singular dative is -iui for the common gender, like in masculine nouns. The biggest part of these words have -t- stem. The second accentuation pattern is the rarest, among its examples are: durys pl. 2 'door', slistis 2 (4) 'simulation', gaištis 2, 4 'dallying' (the two latter can also be accentuated in the fourth paradigm), masculine: pirmuõnys pl. – protozoa, deguõnis (3b) – oxygen. Words with a suffix -men-, for example, ãšmenys pl. 3b – blade, sė́dmenys pl. 3a – buttocks, nates, nẽšmenys pl. 3b – silts, sediments carried by a water stream, are attributed to the third declensional pattern here, but they are of the fifth: the singular (can be used for all, but is not usual for all) nom. is -uo: sėdmuõ – buttock. The singular instrumental is -imi, like in the third declension, while for masculine words of the fifth declension the proper ending is given to be -iu; but -imi can also be and is chosen for the words of the fifth declension.

The fourth, -us, -ius

- There are only 19 words with a non-palatalized ending, and more -j-us, and -ius words.

The fifth, -uo, -ė (gen. sg. -ers)

- The number of words of this class is small. The words are of the third accentuation pattern; one word, šuõ – dog, is of the fourth and has sg. inst. -imi̇̀. One word, or maybe even some more, is of the first accentuation pattern, rė́muo – waterbrash (it can also be accentuated in the third pattern).

About 45% of all nouns are feminine, 55% – masculine.

==== Grouping by a syllable nucleus of a pre-desinential syllable ====
In the tables below the possibilities of syllable nucleus of the next-to-last syllable and their accent is shown. The different sound of a next-to-last syllable makes no grammatical distinction, for example, words nóras – wish and kū́nas – body, are of the same declensional and accentuation patterns. But there are a few certain differences in the accentuation features of the nucleus sounds of the next-to-last syllable. Most vowels and diphthongs can take either of the accents: a start-firm or an end-firm. Short a, e sounds, when they are in a stem of a word and stressed, lengthen and have always an end-firm accent; i, u are short and there is no accentual differentiation in their stress. Mixed diphthongs (a, e) + (l, m, n, r) have the first element lengthened when stressed in a start-firm accent, when in (i, u) + (l, m, n, r) and a diphthong ui the first element remains short in the same case. The words having ą, ę in a pre-desinential syllable are not included here because of the lack of declensional types. Some examples: rą̃stas 2 – balk, timber; žąsi̇̀s 4 – goose; ąsà 4 – handle; kę́sas 3 – hassock.

The four different accentuation patterns are distinguished by two different colors in the rows of the table, their sequence is from the top to the bottom – I, II, III, IV. The words of each accentuation type are given in the following sequence of the declensional types:

- The first declension (masculine)

- -as,
- -is (I–II accentuational pattern) / -ys (III–IV accentuational patterns) and a few -ias words. Their genitive singular is -io.

- The second declension (feminine)

- -a (-ia)
- -ė

- The third declension (mostly feminine, few masculine): -is; genitive singular is -ies
- The fourth declension (masculine): -us (-ius)

Some spaces of the tables are not filled, but this does not mean that there are no words which would fit. The sounds a, e (end-firm when stressed) and i, u (short) can not be start-firm and consequently the word having them in the next-to-last stressed syllable can not be of the first and the third accentuation pattern. Some of the declensional types include few words, for example there are only two words of the third accentuation pattern in the fifth declension: sūnùs and lietùs. The number of words (Dictionary of contemporary Lithuanian language / Dabartinės Lietuvių kalbos žodynas; the fourth issue, 2000) of the declensional patterns can be checked in the section above.

After some of the words in the tables, a number is added. It indicates an alternative existent accentuation pattern and is given only for some of the words that have an alternative accentuation in the language. Notice that the type of accentuation of a word is shown by the place in the table and the number added means only an alternative accentuation type, which is not necessarily the main one. Some of the alternative accentuation patterns of a word are used equally often (then they are given not in brackets here), some are known from dialects, not preferred (then they are given in brackets).

Here are some illustrations of the alternative accentuation: a word nykštỹs 3 is also commonly said nýkštis 1; zýlė 1 is also known as zylė̃ 3 in some dialects, but this form is used more narrowly and not shown here. Similarly, a word rýkštė 1 is also known as rykštė̃ 4; this is shown in the table. In the case of šálmas 3 – helmet, the variant šal̃mas 4 is also very common. The alternative forms are most usually present between the 1–3 and 2–4 accentuation patterns, same in the type of accent. But there are also different cases, for example, rýkštė 1 and rykštė̃ 4. The fourth accentuation paradigm can be the result of a shift of the third paradigm. The shift can happen following nivellation of the two accents, a loss of accentual contrast. In the case of nivellation of the start-firm and end-firm accents, the distinction between the 3–4 and 1–2 loses its ground, because in a place of the stress the 1 with the 2, the 3 with the 4 accentuation groups differ only in a few cases.

Among the words given in the table, some are older, for example, ver̃pstė 2 – distaff, sker̃džius 2 – chief cowherd, butcher, and some other. Some words are borrowings: bánkas 1 – bank, tánkas 1 – tank, dùrpės – peat, turf and some other. Old borrowings: vỹnas 2 (4) – wine, blỹnas 2 – pancake, rõžė 2 – rose, rūtà 2 (4) – rue, slyvà 2 (4) – plum, vyšnià 2 (1) – cherry, and some other.

o	ė	y	ū	i.e.	uo
nóras – wish plótas – area, stretch sóstas – throne, stool	vė́jas – wind	výras – man, male týrai pl. – large empty stretches sývai pl. – liquid part of smth.	kū́nas – body liū́nas – bog	pi̇́enas (pl. 1, 3) – milk svi̇́estas (3) – butter	púodas – pot šúoras – gust, air-blast skrúostas – cheek
brólis – brother sótis – satiety klónis – dene, hollow mólis – clay	pavė́sis – cooler place in a shade	blýksnis – flash nýkštis 3 – thumb	sū́ris – cheese kū́jis – hammer kū́gis – cone (geometry)	ki̇́etis – artemisia (plants)	šúolis – jump slúoksnis – layer súopis – buzzard rúonis – seal (animal) úošvis – father-in-law
kója – leg lóva – bed	vė́tra - windstorm, scud lė́šos pl. – fund, means pė́da 3 – foot	gýsla – thread, vas ýda – defect, vice	lū́pa – lip kū́dra – pond, mere	li̇́epa – linden pi̇́eva – meadow si̇́ena – wall	úoga – berry dúona – bread kúosa – jackdaw
dróbė – linen, cloth rópė – turnip		zýlė – tit (birds) rýkštė (4) – rod, switch lýsvė – bed (agriculture)		ki̇́elė (3) – wagtail	úošvė – mother-in-law
nósis – nose krósnis – stove, furnace tóšis – upper layer of birch bark	klė́tis – barn, granary	nýtys pl. – harness for warp	lū́šis – lynx rū́šis (3) – sort; species kliū́tis (4) – obstacle; hurdle	i̇́etis – spear, javelin	
sõdas – garden skrõblas – hornbeam	dė̃klas - encasement kė̃nis – fir (abies)	sklỹpas 4 – plot, parcel vỹnas – wine blỹnas – pancake	bū̃das – mode; nature		luõtas (1) – dugout, cockleshell
žõdis – word skõnis – taste lõbis – treasure	vė̃sis – cool bė̃giai – metal, railing smė̃lis – sand	lỹgis – level skỹstis – liquid, fluid; liquidity	bū̃vis – state, existence dū̃ris – prick smū̃gis - punch; thwack rū̃gštis – sourness	kiẽtis – hardness viẽnis – oneness miẽžis – barley sriẽgis – screw thread	guõlis – lying place; bearing (mechanical)
kopà – dune		vyšnià – cherry slyvà – plum	rūtà – rue (plant)	vietà – place	
rõžė – rose	nė̃gė – lamprey (fish)		lū̃gnė – nuphar	piẽnė – sowthistle	
			(krū̃tis) 4 - breast (women's)		
sõdžius – village rõjus – paradise		skỹrius – department; chapter		spiẽčius – close cluster, swarm (often for insects)	
stógas – roof kótas – shaft, handle óras – air; weather	krė́slas 1 – easy chair pė́das – sheaf	rýtas – morning	grū́das – grain	sti̇́ebas – stipe dri̇́ežas – lizzard	lúobas – thick peel úodas – mosquito
lokỹs – bear	vėžỹs (4) – crayfish	nykštỹs (1) – thumb			
	pėdà 1 – foot			skiedrà (4) – sliver, shingle	(kuopà) 1 – company (military)
	brėkšmė̃ – dusk, break (around sunset or before sunrise)				
			rūgšti̇̀s (1) – acid (rūši̇̀s) 1 – sort; species		
			sūnùs – son	lietùs – rain	
lõpas – patch			rū̃kas – fog	sniẽgas – snow kiẽmas – yard šiẽnas – hay	kuõlas – stake, picket
lovỹs – trough, chamfer korỹs – honeycomb	vėžlỹs – turtle	ryšỹs – link, bond plyšỹs – interstice, opening	būrỹs – squad; huddle rūsỹs – cellar, vault	kvietỹs 3 – wheat	
žmonà – wife tvorà – fence vorà – queue, file	vėsà – cool bėdà – trouble, grief mėsà – meat	bylà – lawsuit, cause tylà – silence	pūgà – blizzard stūmà – repulsion (physics)	dienà – day šviesà – light liepsnà – flame	puotà – feast; beanfeast uolà – rock
srovė̃ – current, stream	gėlė̃ – flower kėdė̃ – chair dėžė̃ – box	skylė̃ – hole, slot	žūklė̃ – fishing	miẽlės pl. – yeast rievė̃ – notch, groove	duobė̃ (3) – pit, hollow uoslė̃ – smell; scent
		lyti̇̀s – sex, gender vyti̇̀s – switch, rod	krūti̇̀s (2) – breast (womans') griūti̇̀s - avalanche, fall		
žmogùs – man (human)				piẽtūs pl. – dinner; south	

au	ai	ei	a	e	i	u
šáukštas – spoon	káimas – village, countryside	véidas – face				
jáutis – bull, ox	stáibis 2 – dial. shin; forearm for birds: tarsus					
sáuja – palmfull	káina – price					
sáulė – sun kriáušė – pear	váišė – regale láimė – luck, happiness báimė – fear	méilė – love				
gaũbtas – hood skliaũtas 4 – vault (architecture) aũlas 4 – bootleg; sheatheable thing	sai̇̃tas 4 – bond; leash žai̇̃zdras 4 – forge, hearth	plei̇̃štas 1 – wedge, shim rei̇̃das – raid	pãdas – sole, metatarsus žãbas – switch, stick lãbas – good, welfare	mẽtas – specific time (to do smth.; of smth.)	spri̇̀gtas – flip, flick	bùtas – flat kùras – fuel
paũkštis – bird plaũtis – lung kriaũšis (4m, 4f) – steep slope	rai̇̃štis – band, tie kai̇̃štis – spile, plug	pei̇̃lis – knife	vãris – copper	kẽlis – knee mẽdis – tree sẽnis – old		
			balà – puddle		girià – forest (large)	putà – froth
raũdė – rudd kiaũlė – pig (kriaũšė) – steep slope	rai̇̃dė 4 – letter skai̇̃drė (4) – slide, transparency	krei̇̃vė (4) – curve, graph	brãškė – strawberry	žẽmė – earth, ground prẽkė – commodity, item kẽkė – raceme, cluster	bi̇̀tė – bee	ùpė – river pùsė – half, side striùkė – jacket
	gai̇̃štis 4 – dallying, waste of time				sli̇̀stis (4) – simulation	dùrys pl. – door
	vai̇̃sius – fruit; growth skai̇̃čius – number; digit					cùkrus – sugar
šiáudas – straw máuras – slime, algae	dáiktas – thing (material) láiškas – letter (message) áidas – echo	méistras – master (artist); craftsman				
	aikštė̃ – square, field					
sraũtas – flow, torrent laukas – field; outside džiaugsmas – joy kraũjas – blood	mai̇̃stas – food žai̇̃bas – thunder žai̇̃slas – toy lai̇̃kas – time lai̇̃das – cable, lead	vei̇̃ksmas – act, action	krãštas – edge; country smãkras – chin kãras – war	lẽdas – ice pẽnas – pabulum kẽras – plant sinuous ramification	klijai̇̃ pl. – glue	dùgnas – floor, bottom
šaulỹs – rifleman, shooter straublỹs – trunk, proboscis (kriaušỹs 2m 4f) – steep slope	gaidỹs – rooster		dagỹs – thistle vabzdỹs – insect	kepsnỹs – roast, fry krepšỹs – basket, bag genỹs - woodpecker kẽlias – road svẽčias – guest		drugỹs – butterfly, moth; shake, shiver
briaunà – edge, brow klausà – hearing (sense)	dainà – song gaivà – fresh	šeimà – family			girà – kvass	
šaulė̃ – shooter raukšlė̃ – pucker	raidė̃ 2 – slide, transparency	eilė̃ – row	katė̃ – cat			skruzdė̃ – ant
ausi̇̀s – ear šlauni̇̀s – thigh (kriauši̇̀s 2m 4m) – steep slope	gaišti̇̀s 2 – dallying, waste of time		nakti̇̀s – night šali̇̀s – country		sriti̇̀s – area vini̇̀s – nail, spike	ugni̇̀s – fire pusni̇̀s – snowdrift žuvi̇̀s – fish
			alùs – beer	medùs – honey	vidùs – inside midùs – mead (drink)	

al	el	am	em	an	en
káltas – chisel, boaster	kéltas – ferryboat méldas – bulrush			bánkas – bank tánkas – tank	lénkas – Pole
		sámtis – ladle (spoon)			
málka – firewood billet dálba – pole, stick	gélda – trough, tub	bámba – navel támsta – address to a person (formal)	lémpa – lamp		
kálvė – smithery, forge	kélnės pl. – trousers pélkė – swamp		pémpė - lapwing		néndrė – reed ménkė – cod
váltis – boat				pántis – tether ántis – duck ánkštis – pod, pulse	péntis – thick side of a sharp implement
stálčius – drawer (furniture)		ámžius – age			
bal̃dai pl. – furniture				gañdras 4 – stork	beñdras – confederate, companion; accomplice
val̃gis – meal, dish, food al̃ksnis – alder dal̃gis – scythe		kam̃štis – plug, cork sam̃tis – ladling (action)		skrañdis – stomach añtis – slash of garment at the bosom; place inside it to the girdle añkštis – lack of space	sleñkstis – threshold
valkà – draught (air)				rankà – hand; arm	
pal̃vė – flat place in terrene side behind shore dunes					šveñtė – feast, celebration skleñdė 4 – latch beñdrė – see bendras
bal̃džius – furniture maker (person)					
kálnas – mountain šálmas 4 – helmet	délnas – palm, flat of a hand kélmas – stump, stool		kémsas – hassock	žándas – face side below a cheekbone lángas – window	
galvà – head					
bal̃nas – saddle val̃ksmas – haul of a fishing net; track of lumber dragging	pel̃nas – profit	kam̃pas – angle; corner		lañkas – bow (weapon) gañdas – hearsay, rumour krañtas (dial. 2, 1) – waterside, shore	
žaltỹs (3) – grass snake; colubrid		kamblỹs – stipe; squat ending dramblys – elephant	kremblỹs – gnarly tree		
kalbà – language spalvà – colour algà – salary valkà – puddle				lankà – meadow, hollow dangà – covering bandà – herd; loaf (food)	lentà – board; wood cut
kaltė̃ – guilt; fault			templė̃ – elastic string (of a bow etc.)	tankmė̃ – thicket	sklendė̃ (2) – valve; latch
				danti̇̀s – tooth	
				dangùs – sky	

ar	er	ir	ur
tárpas – gap tvártas – cattle-shed žárdas (3 2) – rack from poles		i̇̀rklas – oar, paddle	dùrklas – dagger
		žvi̇̀rblis – sparrow vi̇̀ržis – heather, ling ži̇̀rnis – pea	gùrkšnis – swallow, gulp kùrmis – mole (animal)
várna – crow žárna 3 – bowel; hose		sti̇̀rna – roe, hind gi̇̀rna – millstone	spùrga – doughnut
kárvė – cow	šnérvė 4 – nostril kérpė – lichen šérpė – burr, tear off		dùrpės – peat
kártis – long slender pole		ki̇̀rkšnis 3 (4) – groin svi̇̀rtis (4, 3, 2) – lever; shaduf	
var̃žtas – screw var̃tai pl. – gate kar̃tas – time (instance or occurrence)	ner̃štas – spawning sver̃tas – lever; fig. leverage	skir̃pstas – field elm	Tur̃tas – wealth, property pur̃slas 4 (1) – spatter, spray
kar̃štis – heat kar̃šis – bream	ver̃šis – calf	tvir̃tis – strength of material, toughness	
		virkščià – stem of some gramineous plants (pea, potato) pirkià (4) – dial. house, cottage (traditional)	
gar̃dė – barrier wood cut in a side of a horse carriage	ver̃pstė – distaff	vir̃vė – rope	
	der̃lius – yield, harvest sker̃džius – chief cowherd; butcher		Tur̃gus – market, mart
dárbas – work	bérnas – boy, lad; (older) hind, hired hand béržas – birch šérnas (4) – wild boar	spi̇̀rgas – crackling (food) ži̇̀rgas (4) – riding horse	spùrgas – hop cone; bud; catkin ùrvas – cave; burrow
arklỹs – horse			
			burnà – mouth
varškė̃ – curd	versmė̃ – fount, spring		
		širdi̇̀s – heart kirkšni̇̀s 1 (4) – groin	
var̃das – name gar̃sas – sound kar̃klas 2 – willow, osier gar̃das – animal stall	šer̃kšnas – hoarfrost, rime ver̃slas – trade, enterprice, business ver̃ksmas – cry	vir̃bas – rod, switch dir̃žas – belt (clothing); strap pir̃štas – finger	pur̃vas – mud, dirt
			siurblỹs – pump; (dulkių siurblys) vacuum cleaner čiurlỹs – swift
varžà – resistance; impedance (physics) barzdà – beard	skerlà – sliver, shiver		purkšnà – mizzle, spraying
tarmė̃ – dialect dermė̃ – tone, fitness varlė̃ – frog	vertė̃ – value erdvė̃ – space veržlė̃ – nut (hardware)		
tarti̇̀s – pronunciation, utterance	šerdi̇̀s (3 1) – core	pirti̇̀s – steambath	
		viršùs – top	

il	ul	im	um	in	un
ti̇̀ltas – bridge miltai pl. – flour					tùntas 4 – swarm, flock
di̇̀lbis – forearm i̇̀ltis – fang	mùlkis – ninny, gull, noodle stùlgis – (older) dagger kùlšis – haunch, thigh (mostly used for chicken meat)		kùmštis – fist	vi̇̀ngis (2) – winding, curve li̇̀nkis – bend, curvature	
smi̇̀lga – bentgrass vi̇̀lna – wool		ti̇̀mpa – elastic string dri̇̀mba 2 – ponderous person (derisive)		vi̇̀nkšna – elm (ulmus laevis) spi̇̀nta – cabinet (furniture) ki̇̀nka – rare side of a leg about a knee level	plùnksna – feather
di̇̀ldė – rasp	tùlpė – tulip dùlkė – particle of dust, mote bùlvė – potato		dùmplės pl. – bellows	pi̇̀nklės pl. (2) – trap, gin	
ski̇̀ltis (3) – segment of a fruit, vegetable; section in a recurring print				pi̇̀ntis – amadou	
	dul̃ksmas 4 – dust rise		stum̃bras – wisent dum̃blas 4 – silt	iñdas – dishware, utensil tiñklas – net giñklas – weapon	
skil̃vis – gizzard			kum̃pis – ham	skliñdis – pancake liñksnis – (case) inflection, case (grammar)	suñkis – gravitation
				rinkà – market	sunkà – strained juice
	gul̃bė – swan		drum̃zlė 4 – sediment	bliñdė (4) – great willow	
vil̃nis 4 – wave					
skilti̇̀s 1 – (see 1)					
vil̃kas – wolf pil̃vas – belly	stul̃pas – pole, shaft, pillar kul̃nas – heel pul̃kas – regiment; swarm	rim̃bas – knout; whip	gum̃bas – knag; lumb		tuñtas 1 – swarm, flock
skilvỹs 2 – gizzard	stulgỹs – great snipe		krumplỹs (2) – knuckle; cog		
	dulksnà – drizzle				sunkà 2 – strained juice
			drumzlė̃ 2 - sediment		
vilni̇̀s 2 – wave	kulkšni̇̀s (1) – ankle				

== Adjectives ==
=== Formation ===
In the same case as in nouns the adjectives may be formed by adding a suffix, e.g., -inis, -ingas (full in), -iškas (alike), -klus etc. A further noun is formed by changing the ending of the adjectives to -is (-ys), -ė. The genitive case is many times used instead of the -inis, e.g. medžio dirbinys - an artwork from wood, šokių muzikos gabalas - dance music piece (šokinis would sound awkward). The dative may also used, e.g. užtiesalas lovai - a cloth for bed. The adjectival suffix -inis may easily become a noun (also -inys then), for example, kosmetinė rankinė (terba / tašė), psichochroninė ligoninė (įstaiga).

=== Declension ===
In Lithuanian, adjectives have three declensions determined by the singular and plural nominative case inflections. Adjectives agree with nouns in number, gender, and case. Unlike nouns, which have two genders – masculine and feminine, adjectives have three (except -is, -ė adjectives), but the neuter adjectives (the third example in the table) have only one form and are not inflected. The neuter gender is formed simply by eliminating the last consonant -s from the masculine gender forms.

Declension	Singular nom. inflection		Plural nom. inflection		Examples
Declension	Masculine	Feminine	Masculine	Feminine	Examples
I	-(i)as	-(i)a	-i	-(i)os	šáltas, šaltà, (šálta) – cold; šlápias, šlapià, (šlápia) – wet, soppy;
II	-us	-i	-ūs	-ios	gražùs, graži̇̀, (gražù) – pretty, beautiful; malonùs, maloni̇̀, (malonù) – pleasant;
III	-is	-ė	-iai	-ės	vari̇̀nis, vari̇̀nė – copper; lauki̇̀nis, lauki̇̀nė – wild;
III	-is	-ė	-i	-ės	di̇̀delis, di̇̀delė – big; dešinỹs, dešinė̃ – right; kairỹs, kairė̃ – left.

All the adjectives (except most -inis type adjectives) can have pronominal (definite) forms that cannot acquire the neuter form:

Declension	Singular nom. inflection		Plural nom. inflection		Examples
Declension	Masculine	Feminine	Masculine	Feminine	Examples
I	-(i)asis	-(i)oji	-ieji	-(i)osios	šaltàsis, šaltóji – the cold; šlapiàsis, šlapióji – the wet;
II	-usis	-ioji	-ieji	-iosios	gražùsis, gražióji – the pretty, the beautiful; malonùsis, malonióji – the pleasant;
III	-is	-ė	-iai	-ės	―
III	-ysis	-ioji	-ieji	-iosios	didỹsis, didžióji – the big, the great; dešinỹsis, dešinióji – the right; kairỹsis, kairióji – the left.

The pronominal adjectives historically have developed from the combination of the simple adjectives and the respective pronominal forms jis, ji (he, she), that is, gẽras + ji̇̀s = geràsis; an example in locative case (feminine gender): gražiosè + josè = gražiósiose. They have their own separate declension paradigms.

Pronominal adjectives have a variety of purposes in modern Lithuanian. One of them is the definitiveness, that is, these adjectives can sometimes act like an equivalent of the definite article in English: Suvalgiau raudoną obuolį – I've eaten a red apple; Suvalgiau raudonąjį obuolį – I've eaten the red apple. But they are rarely used this way, as demonstrative pronouns serve better for this purpose. Pronominal adjectives often indicate something unique, thus they are usually used with proper names: Juodoji jūra, Vytautas Didysis, Naujoji Zelandija. Another use (and a very common) is scientific terminology: kvapusis mairūnas, dėmėtoji pelėda, standusis diskas etc. In almost all of these cases, a simple adjective can be used, but it will mean a completely different thing: juoda jūra (instead of Juodoji jūra) means any sea that is black (not necessarily the particular sea in Eastern Europe); dėmėta pelėda (instead of dėmėtoji pelėda) means any owl that has dots on its plumage (not necessarily an owl of the Strix occidentalis species) etc.

- Most of the first type adjectives of the third declension are with the suffix -in-. These are easily made from other parts of speech by adding the suffix -in-. When made from verbs, they are mostly made from a past passive participle: vi̇̀rti – to boil, vi̇̀rtas – boiled, virti̇̀nis – which is boiled, made by boiling. Consequently, the suffix is -t-in- for such adjectives. Such variants of verbal derivation easily become nouns (declined in noun declension paradigm), in this case it is a noun virti̇̀nis – dumpling (with mushrooms; curd; etc.; but dumplings with meat are called koldūnai).
- Two adjectives of the third declension have long -ys: dešinỹs – right, kairỹs – left; plural nominative is dešini̇̀, kairi̇̀; plural dative: dešini̇́ems, kairi̇́ems. A short form of di̇̀delis, di̇̀delė is di̇̀dis, didi̇̀ (similar to pats, pati). Dešinys, kairys, didis have neuter gender of the u pattern: dešinu, kairu, didu. Pronominal forms: didỹsis, didžióji, dešinỹsis, dešinióji. An adjective didelis, didelė hasn't pronominal forms. The word didis has more mingled forms: nominative is sometimes didus; genitive masc.: didžio / didaus; accusative: didį (/ didų); plural masc. nom. didūs; other forms are of the regular pattern.
- Some other forms having variations in a standard language: pė́sčias, pėsčià, pė́sčia – pedestrian, afoot; pėsčiàsis, pėsčióji and pėstỹsis, pėsčióji (adjectival and substantival meanings).

In the following examples of noun and adjective matching, gatvė – street and kelias – road are matched with tiesus – straight:

- Tiesi gatvė vs. tiesios gatvės (singular vs. plural)
- Tiesi gatvė vs. tiesus kelias (feminine vs. masculine)
- Tiesi gatvė vs. tiesią gatvę (nominative vs. accusative case)

This does not apply in case of the neuter gender adjectives because nouns do not have neuter gender. Such adjectives are used in combination with other parts of speech having no gender (infinitive, some pronouns) or in zero subject sentences and tend to describe a general environment. For example, rūsyje buvo vėsu (zero subject sentence) – it was cool in the cellar; gera tave matyti (the gender neutral infinitive (matyti) is the subject) – it's good to see you. Moreover, adjectives in neuter can be used as an object (and in some cases – as a subject) as well (a rough equivalent of English "that which is" + adjective): jis matė šilta ir šalta – he saw [that which is] cold and hot (he went through fire and water). Adjectives that end in -is do not have the neuter gender. Most of the time neuter gender adjectives are written just like feminine adjectives. However, in the spoken language, neuter gender is distinguished by different stress. Also neuter gender does not have any numbers or cases, and it is mostly used for predicatives. Usage in the role of object (like in "jis matė šilta ir šalta") is rare.

=== Degrees of comparison ===
The Lithuanian language has five degrees of comparison. The three main degrees are the same as in English language. Note that there are no irregular adjectives and all adjectives have the same suffixes. All such adjectives still need to match the nouns in terms of case, number, and gender. Neuter gender comparative degree is the same as adjective comparative degree.

Language	Gender	positive	comparative		superlative	
Lithuanian	Masculine	Gẽras	Gerėlèsnis	Gerèsnis	Geriáusias	Pàts/visų̃ geriáusias
Lithuanian	Feminine	Gerà	Gerėlèsnė	Gerèsnė	Geriáusia	Pati̇̀/visų̃ geriáusia
Lithuanian	Neuter	Gẽra	Gerėliaũ	Geriaũ	Geriáusia	Visų̃ geriáusia
English		Good	A tiny bit better	Better	Best	The very best
Lithuanian	Masculine	Gražùs	Gražėlèsnis	Gražèsnis	Gražiáusias	Pats/visų gražiáusias
Lithuanian	Feminine	Graži̇̀	Gražėlèsnė	Gražèsnė	Gražiáusia	Pati̇̀/visų̃ gražiáusia
Lithuanian	Neuter	Gražù	Gražėliaũ	Gražiaũ	Gražiáusia	Visų̃ gražiáusia
English		Beautiful	A tiny bit more beautiful	More beautiful	Most beautiful	The most beautiful

Adjectives of different degrees can also have their pronominal forms:

Language	Gender	positive	comparative	superlative
Lithuanian	Masculine	Geràsis	Geresnỹsis	Geriáusiasis
Lithuanian	Feminine	Geróji	Geresnióji	Geriáusioji
Lithuanian	Neuter	–	–	–
English		The good	The better	The very best
Lithuanian	Masculine	Gražùsis	Gražesnỹsis	Gražiáusiasis
Lithuanian	Feminine	Gražióji	Gražesnióji	Gražiáusioji
Lithuanian	Neuter	–	–	–
English		The beautiful	The more beautiful	The most beautiful

== Pronouns ==
Lithuanian has no grammatical category of animacy. Pronouns (including personal ones jis, ji, jie, jos (he, she, they)) replace any noun, regardless if it is not animate (people, animals, objects etc.). Whom did you see? and What did you see? both translate as Ką tu matei?; Something is there and Somebody is there both translate as Ten kažkas yra.

=== Personal pronouns ===
Personal pronouns aš (I), tu (you) jis (he, it), ji (she, it) are declined as follows:

			Nominative	Genitive	Dative	Accusative	Instrumental	Locative
Singular	1st person		aš	manęs	man	mane	manimi	manyje
Singular	2nd person		tu	tavęs	tau	tave	tavimi	tavyje
Singular	3rd person	Masculine	jis	jo	jam	jį	juo	jame
Singular	3rd person	Feminine	ji	jos	jai	ją	ja	joje
	Reflexive pronoun		–	savęs	sau	save	savimi	savyje
Plural	1st person		mes	mūsų	mums	mus	mumis	mumyse
Plural	2nd person		jūs	jūsų	jums	jus	jumis	jumyse
Plural	3rd person	Masculine	jie	jų	jiems	juos	jais	juose
Plural	3rd person	Feminine	jos	jų	joms	jas	jomis	jose

=== Reflexive pronoun ===
The reflexive pronoun savęs is declined like tu (savęs – sau – save ...), but it does not have the singular nominative and plural cases.

== Verbs ==
Every Lithuanian verb belongs to one of three different conjugations:

- The first conjugation is the most commonly found in Lithuanian, encompassing those verbs whose infinite form ends in -oti, -auti, -uoti or a consonant followed by -ti (e.g. dirbti). This conjugation also has the highest occurrence of irregularity of all the Lithuanian verb cases.
- The second conjugation refers to those verbs whose infinitive form ends in -ėti. There are hardly any instances of irregularity for this conjugation. An exception: verbs that have -ėja in the Present Tense (like didėti / didėja / didėjo 'to increase') belong to the first conjugation.
- The third conjugation consists of those verbs whose infinitive form ends in -yti. An exception: verbs that have -ija in the Present Tense (like rūdyti / rūdija / rūdijo 'to rust') belong to the first conjugation.

In Lithuanian every single verbal form can be derived from three stems: infinitive, 3rd person present tense and 3rd person past tense.

Lithuanian verbs belong to one of the following stem types:

- primary (verbs without suffixes: pykti, pyksta, pyko ʽto be angry’). This group encompasses most of the verbs with irregular or unpredictable forms;
- mixed (verbs with suffixes in certain forms: mylėti, myli, mylėjo ʽto love’);
- suffixal (verbs with suffixes in all forms: didėti, didėja, didėjo ʽto increase’).

The 3rd person of every conjugatable verbal form in Lithuanian has no distinction between numbers: all the singular, dual and plural forms have merged into one single form. Declinable forms (such as compound tenses and passive structures), however, must match according to gender and number. This is a shared feature with its closest relative, the Latvian language.

Modern Lithuanian grammarians no longer consider the 3rd person as having an ending, instead it is now called the "final stem vowel" to which a personal ending is attached in order to make the 1st and the 2nd persons:

	Simple		Reflexive	
	Singular	Plural	Singular	Plural
1st	u	me	uosi	mės
2nd	i	te	iesi	tės
3rd	∅		∅ + si	

In reality, however, the attachment of the respective ending to the 3rd person stem is not straightforward and requires additional conversion, e. g. if the 3rd person stem ends in -a, the attachment of the ending -u to make the 1st person form produces -u instead of the expected -au. Moreover, certain notable forms have dropped the final vowel in the 3rd person (future tense, conditional mood), however, the forms for other persons are still composed having the stem vowel in mind (dirbti to work → dirbs he will work → dirbsime we will work). Each one of these conversions are being represented in the following conjugation tables.

=== Active voice ===
The active voice in Lithuanian has four moods:

- Indicative
- Indirect
- Imperative
- Conditional

==== Indicative mood ====
In the active voice, the indicative mood contains 4 simple and 7 compound tenses.

In each tense five examples are given: three belonging to each conjugation group (dirbti, norėti, skaityti), one reflexive (praustis) and būti – the only auxiliary verb, and also one of the irregular and suppletive verbs, in Lithuanian.

===== Present tense =====
This is the basic tense in Lithuanian which describes present or ongoing actions or, sometimes, actions without definite tense. Its forms and stress patterns are always derived from the 3rd person of the Present tense.

	di̇̀rbti – to work	norė́ti – to want	skaitýti – to read	praũstis – to wash oneself	bū́ti – to be (es- stem)	bū́ti – to be (būn- stem)	bū́ti – to be (būv- stem)
I	di̇̀rbu	nóriu	skaitaũ	prausiúosi	esù	būnù	būvù
You (singular)	di̇̀rbi	nóri	skaitai̇̃	prausi̇́esi	esi̇̀	būni̇̀	būvi̇̀
He/She/It	di̇̀rba	nóri	skai̇̃to	praũsiasi	yrà / ẽsti	bū̃na	bū̃va
We	di̇̀rbame	nórime	skai̇̃tome	praũsiamės	ẽsame	bū̃name	bū̃vame
You (plural)	di̇̀rbate	nórite	skai̇̃tote	praũsiatės	ẽsate	bū̃nate	bū̃vate
They	di̇̀rba	nóri	skai̇̃to	praũsiasi	yrà / ẽsti	bū̃na	bū̃va

E.g. dirbu = 'I work', (tu) nori = 'You want', skaitome = 'We read' (present tense).

The auxiliary verb bū́ti has two conjugations suppleting each other in the Present tense: an irregular one (based on es-/yr- stems) and a regular one (based on the būn- / būv- stem). The difference is that the stem bū̃n-/bū̃v- has an iterative meaning (to be frequently): Mokiniai̇̃ yrà pasiruõšę – The pupils are ready; Mokiniai̇̃ bū̃na pasiruõšę – The pupils are often ready. The 3rd person form ẽsti is semantically equivalent to bū̃na or bū̃va, but is rarely used in modern Lithuanian. The bū̃v- stem is very rare in modern Lithuanian.

In the -i conjugation type, the 1st person of singular loses the final stem vowel -i, but the last stem consonant becomes palatalized (the sound [ɪ] is absent in nóriu [n̪ôːrʲʊ], the letter i merely denotes palatalization). If the stem ends with a consonant -d, it becomes -dž: girdėti to hear → girdi he hears → girdžiu I hear.

The accentuation of all persons always corresponds to the accentuation of the 3rd person. The only exception is when its accented syllable is penultimate (excluding the reflexive formant -si) and has a short vowel (bi̇̀jo – he is afraid) or a rising tone (skai̇̃to – he reads, praũsiasi – he washes himself): in that case the 1st and the 2nd persons of singular move the stress to the ending: bijaũ, bijai̇̃; skaitaũ, skaitai̇̃; prausiúosi, prausi̇́esi.

===== Past tense =====
This is the basic tense in Lithuanian which describes past actions (ongoing or complete). Its forms and stress patterns are always derived from the 3rd person of the Past tense.

	di̇̀rbti – to work	norė́ti – to want	skaitýti – to read	praũstis – to wash oneself	bū́ti – to be
I	di̇̀rbau	norė́jau	skaičiaũ	prausiaũsi	buvaũ
You (singular)	di̇̀rbai	norė́jai	skaitei̇̃	prausei̇̃si	buvai̇̃
He/She/It	di̇̀rbo	norė́jo	skai̇̃tė	praũsėsi	bùvo
We	di̇̀rbome	norė́jome	skai̇̃tėme	praũsėmės	bùvome
You (plural)	di̇̀rbote	norė́jote	skai̇̃tėte	praũsėtės	bùvote
They	di̇̀rbo	norė́jo	skai̇̃tė	praũsėsi	bùvo

E.g. dirbau = 'I worked', norėjai = 'You wanted', skaitėme = 'We read' (past tense)

In the -ė conjugation type, the last stem consonant becomes palatalized. If the stem ends with a consonant -t or -d, in the 1st person of singular it becomes -č or -dž respectively: kęsti to suffer → kentė he suffered → kenčiau I suffered; melsti to beg → meldė he begged → meldžiau I begged.

The accentuation of all persons always corresponds to the accentuation of the 3rd person. The only exception is when its accented syllable is penultimate (excluding the reflexive formant -si) and has a short vowel (bùvo – he was) or a rising tone (skai̇̃tė – he read, praũsėsi – he washed himself): in that case the 1st and the 2nd persons of singular move the stress to the ending: buvaũ, buvai̇̃; skaičiaũ, skaitei̇̃; prausiaũsi, prausei̇̃si.

===== Past iterative tense =====
The basic meaning of this tense translates as "used to" in English. Its construction is simple:

- Remove the infinitive ending -ti (the stress pattern is always the same as the infinitive).
- Add the suffix -dav- to the stem.
- Finally, add the corresponding ending of the past tense for the first conjugation.

	di̇̀rbti – to work	norė́ti – to want	skaitýti – to read	praũstis – to wash oneself	bū́ti – to be
I	di̇̀rbdavau	norė́davau	skaitýdavau	praũsdavausi	bū́davau
You (singular)	di̇̀rbdavai	norė́davai	skaitýdavai	praũsdavaisi	bū́davai
He/She/It	di̇̀rbdavo	norė́davo	skaitýdavo	praũsdavosi	bū́davo
We	di̇̀rbdavome	norė́davome	skaitýdavome	praũsdavomės	bū́davome
You (plural)	di̇̀rbdavote	norė́davote	skaitýdavote	praũsdavotės	bū́davote
They	di̇̀rbdavo	norė́davo	skaitýdavo	praũsdavosi	bū́davo

E.g. dirbdavau = 'I used to work', norėdavai = 'You used to want', skaitydavome = 'We used to read'

===== Future tense =====
This tense basically describes what will happen in the future. It is relatively simple to form:

- Remove the -ti ending from the infinitive form of the verb.
- Add the -s- suffix which is used to form the Future Tense. Note, that ...š or ...ž + -s- assimilates to š without the final s (the infinitive vežti 'to transport' gives vešiu, veši, veš etc. in the Future Tense). In case the stem itself ends with a final ...s, it is eliminated as well: kąsti (to bite) → kąs.
- Add the appropriate ending.
- All the persons in this tense are completely regular (and retain the stress position and intonation of the infinitive), except for the 3rd one. The latter of this tense changes depending on several rules:

- If the 3rd person's form is stressed in the final or the only syllable with a falling tone (without the inclusion of the reflexive formant -is), it is systematically replaced with a rising tone (kalbė́ti (to speak) → kalbė̃s, pramogáuti (to entertain oneself) → pramogaũs; aukótis (to sacrifice oneself) → aukõsis (the reflexive formant does not count)). This rule does not apply to cases when there the last syllable is not stressed (sáugoti (to protect) → sáugos).

- Primary verbs acquire a short vowel i or u (instead of long y or ū) when the infinitive and the present tense has a long vowel, but the past tense has a short vowel: (lýti (to rain): lỹja, li̇̀jo → li̇̀s; pū́ti (to rot): pū̃va, pùvo → pùs, most importantly: bū́ti (to be): bū̃na, bùvo → bùs).

	di̇̀rbti – to work	norė́ti – to want	skaitýti – to read	praũstis – to wash oneself	bū́ti – to be
I	di̇̀rbsiu	norė́siu	skaitýsiu	praũsiuosi	bū́siu
You (singular)	di̇̀rbsi	norė́si	skaitýsi	praũsiesi	bū́si
He/She/It	dir̃bs	norė̃s	skaitỹs	praũsis	bùs
We	di̇̀rbsime	norė́sime	skaitýsime	praũsimės	bū́sime
You (plural)	di̇̀rbsite	norė́site	skaitýsite	praũsitės	bū́site
They	dir̃bs	norė̃s	skaitỹs	praũsis	bùs

E.g. dirbsiu = 'I shall work', norėsi = 'You will want', skaitysime = 'We shall read'

===== Compound tenses =====
Compound tenses are periphrastic structures having temporal meanings usually relative to actions indicated by other verbs. Two groups of such tenses exist in modern Lithuanian: Perfect and Inchoative. All of them require an auxiliary verb būti (to be) in its respective form and an active voice participle.

====== Perfect tenses ======
There are four perfect tenses in Lithuanian (present, past, past iterative and future) which are all formed using the verb būti in its respective tense and person as well as the active past simple participle in its respective number and gender:

	Present perfect	Past perfect	Past iterative perfect	Future perfect
I	esu skai̇̃tęs / skai̇̃čiusi	buvau skaitęs / skaičiusi	būdavau skaitęs / skaičiusi	būsiu skaitęs / skaičiusi
You (singular)	esi skaitęs / skaičiusi	buvai skaitęs / skaičiusi	būdavai skaitęs / skaičiusi	būsi skaitęs / skaičiusi
He/She/It	yra skaitęs / skaičiusi	buvo skaitęs / skaičiusi	būdavo skaitęs / skaičiusi	bus skaitęs / skaičiusi
We	esame skai̇̃tę / skai̇̃čiusios	buvome skaitę / skaičiusios	būdavome skaitę / skaičiusios	būsime skaitę / skaičiusios
You (plural)	esate skaitę / skaičiusios	buvote skaitę / skaičiusios	būdavote skaitę / skaičiusios	būsite skaitę / skaičiusios
They	yra skaitę / skaičiusios	buvo skaitę / skaičiusios	būdavo skaitę / skaičiusios	bus skaitę / skaičiusios

These tenses (except for present perfect) correspond roughly to equivalent English perfect tenses (I had read / I will have read). They are used in various contexts for very different meanings, but they usually indicate an action that happened before another action said with another verb, noun or similar: Tos knygos neėmiau, nes jau ją buvau skaitęs – I didn't take that book because I had already read it; Po kelionės vaikai bus labai pasiilgę tėvų – After the trip the children will have badly missed their parents.

They are also used for a generalized meaning not associated with a specific event (equivalent of English "Have you ever done it?"): Ar esi buvęs Paryžiuje? – Have you ever been to Paris [any time in your life]?; Esu skaitęs, kad vaistai nuo peršalimo nepadeda – I read [some time ago] that pharmaceuticals are useless against common cold.

Compare phrases: Ar buvai Paryžiuje? – Were you in Paris [that day]?; Skaičiau, kad vaistai nuo peršalimo nepadeda – I read [that day, at a specific moment in my life] that pharmaceuticals are useless against common cold.

The perfect tenses are a common feature of the Lithuanian language and are often used in all types of spoken and written speech.

====== Inchoative tenses ======
There are three inchoative tenses in Lithuanian (past, past iterative and future) which are all formed using the verb būti in its respective tense and person, as well as the active present simple participle in its respective number and gender, complemented with the prefix be-. Note the absence of the present inchoative tense.

	Past inchoative	Past iterative inchoative	Future inchoative
I	buvau beskaitąs / beskaitanti	būdavau beskaitąs / beskaitanti	būsiu beskaitąs / beskaitanti
You (singular)	buvai beskaitąs / beskaitanti	būdavai beskaitąs / beskaitanti	būsi beskaitąs / beskaitanti
He/She/It	buvo beskaitąs / beskaitanti	būdavo beskaitąs / beskaitanti	bus beskaitąs / beskaitanti
We	buvome beskaitą / beskaitančios	būdavome beskaitą / beskaitančios	būsime beskaitą / beskaitančios
You (plural)	buvote beskaitą / beskaitančios	būdavote beskaitą / beskaitančios	būsite beskaitą / beskaitančios
They	buvo beskaitą / beskaitančios	būdavo beskaitą / beskaitančios	bus beskaitą / beskaitančios

These tenses mostly indicate an action that was interrupted by another action said with another verb. They correspond roughly to English "...was about to do something, when": Tėvas buvo beskaitąs laikraštį, bet kažkas paskambino – The father was about to read a newspaper, but someone called.

They can also indicate an action that have started and is still going on during another action (equivalent of English continuous tenses), but they are almost never used in such a way: Kai grįši namo, motina bus bemieganti – When you will get back home, the mother will be sleeping.

Inchoative tenses are not a part of common Lithuanian speech, their use is limited to literary language and even there only past inchoative tense is ever used.

==== Indirect mood ====
The indirect mood in Lithuanian has all and the same tenses (including compound tenses) as the indicative mood, but is not conjugated. Instead of being composed of a conjugatable verb, they are made of pure active participle in nominative case, thus they must match the gender and number of the subject.

	Singular	Plural
Present	skaitą̃s, skai̇̃tanti	skaitą̃, skaitančios
Past	skai̇̃tęs, skai̇̃čiusi	skai̇̃tę, skai̇̃čiusios
Past iterative	skaitýdavęs, skaitýdavusi	skaitýdavę, skaitýdavusios
Future	skaitýsiąs, skaitýsianti	skaitýsią, skaitýsiančios
Present perfect	esą̃s skai̇̃tęs, ẽsanti skai̇̃čiusi	esą̃ skai̇̃tę, ẽsančios skai̇̃čiusios
Past perfect	bùvęs skaitęs, bùvusi skai̇̃čiusi	bùvę skaitę, bùvusios skai̇̃čiusios
Past iterative perfect	bū́davęs skai̇̃tęs, bū́davusi skai̇̃čiusi	bū́davę skai̇̃tę, bū́davusios skai̇̃čiusios
Future perfect	bū́siąs skai̇̃tęs, bū́sianti skai̇̃čiusi	bū́sią skai̇̃tę, bū́siančios skai̇̃čiusios
Past inchoative	bùvęs beskaitą̃s, bùvusi beskai̇̃tanti	bùvę beskaitą̃, bùvusios beskai̇̃tančios
Past iterative inchoative	bū́davęs beskaitą̃s, bū́davusi beskai̇̃tanti	bū́davę beskaitą̃, bū́davusios beskai̇̃tančios
Future inchoative	bū́siąs beskaitą̃s, bū́sianti beskai̇̃tanti	bū́sią beskaitą̃, bū́siančios beskai̇̃tančios

The indirect mood of passive voice is also used. It is composed of an auxiliary active participle formed from the verb būti 'to be' and passive participle which is the main one. So, indirect mood of passive voice can only be compound. Both present and past passive participles are used. The indirect mood of passive voice has the following tenses: present (esąs skaitomas), present perfect (esąs skaitytas), past (buvęs skaitomas), past perfect (buvęs skaitytas), past iterative (būdavęs skaitomas), past iterative perfect (būdavęs skaitytas), future (būsiąs skaitomas), future perfect (būsiąs skaitytas).

The indirect mood, sometimes called "participle speech", has multiple uses, but primarily denote actions not experienced directly by the speaker and bearing a high degree of uncertainty: Čia kažkada stovėjusi tvirtovė – [I'm not really sure, it seems like] some time ago there stood a fortress here.

Another widely known use of the indirect mood is describing actions in fictional literature (especially folklore) (could be considered as an equivalent of French Passé simple, except that in Lithuanian it is not limited to the past): Kartą gyvenęs kalvis, kuris turėjęs du sūnus – Once there lived a smith who had two sons.

In modern Lithuanian this mood is not very widely used, because other ways of expressing uncertainty and fictional events exist.

==== Imperative mood ====
The imperative mood has three forms or tenses (simple, perfect and inchoative). The simple form of the 2nd person of singular, the 1st and the 2nd persons of plural is very regular:

- Remove the infinitive ending -ti (the stress pattern is always the same as the infinitive).
- Add the suffix -k- to the stem.
- Finally, add the corresponding ending.

The 3rd person imperative is sometimes called the "optative mood" and has numerous equivalent forms:

- By adding a simple grammatical prefix te- to the 3rd person of the present tense (tedi̇̀rba – let him work). Used moderately often.
- By adding a simple grammatical prefix te- to the 3rd person of the present tense and replacing the ending with -ie or -ai (tedirbiẽ – let him work, teskai̇̃tai – let him read). Obsolete / rare.
- By adding one of the particles tè, tegùl, tegù, lai̇̃ before the 3rd person of the present tense (or sometimes the future tense): tegùl di̇̀rba – let him work, lai̇̃ skai̇̃to – let him read. Used very often.

	di̇̀rbti – to work	norė́ti – to want	skaitýti – to read	praũstis – to wash oneself	bū́ti – to be
I	—				
You (singular)	di̇̀rbk(i)	norė́k(i)	skaitýk(i)	praũskis	būk(i)
He/She/It	tedirbiẽ / tedi̇̀rba	tenoriẽ / tenóri	teskai̇̃tai / teskai̇̃to	tesiprausiẽ / tesipraũsia	teesiẽ / tebūniẽ / tebùs
We	di̇̀rbkime	norė́kime	skaitýkime	praũskimės	bū́kime
You (plural)	di̇̀rbkite	norė́kite	skaitýkite	praũskitės	bū́kite
They	tedirbiẽ / tedi̇̀rba	tenoriẽ / tenóri	teskai̇̃tai / teskai̇̃to	tesiprausiẽ / tesipraũsia	teesiẽ / tebūniẽ / tebùs

The imperative mood is used to describe an action that the speaker wants another person to do: Duok pinigų! – Give me some money! Iš pradžių įleiskime svečius. – Let us at first invite the guests in. This mood is actively used in modern Lithuanian.

The 2nd person of singular has its ending -i only in poetry / fictional literature. The usage of this ending is usually an indication of poetic style.

The perfect and inchoative forms are composed of the auxiliary verb būti in its simple imperative form and of an active participle of the main verb, matched according to gender and number of the person:

	Perfect	Inchoative
I	—	
You (singular)	būk skaitęs / skaičiusi	būk beskaitąs / beskaitainti
He/She/It	tebūnie skaitęs / skaičiusi	tebūnie beskaitąs / beskaitainti
We	būkime skaitę / skaičiusios	būkime beskaitą / beskaitainčios
You (plural)	būkite skaitę / skaičiusios	būkite beskaitą / beskaitainčios
They	tebūnie skaitę / skaičiusios	tebūnie beskaitą / beskaitančios

Imperative perfect means an instruction of the speaker that has to be completed before some other event: Pirmadienį jau būkite apsisprendę – Please already have your decision made by Monday. This form is actively used in modern Lithuanian.

Imperative inchoative means an instruction of the speaker that has to be started before some other event and continued afterwards: Kai grįšiu, būkite bedirbą – When I'll come back, please be working. This form is obsolete.

==== Conditional mood ====
The conditional mood has three forms or tenses (simple, perfect and inchoative). It is very regular to form:

- Remove the infinitive suffix -ti (the stress pattern is always the same as the infinitive).
- Add the respective suffix and ending.

	di̇̀rbti – to work	norė́ti – to want	skaitýti – to read	praũstis – to wash oneself	bū́ti – to be
I	di̇̀rbčiau	norė́čiau	skaitýčiau	praũsčiausi	bū́čiau
You (singular)^{1}	di̇̀rbtum(ei)	norė́tum(ei)	skaitýtum(ei)	praũstumeisi	bū́tum(ei)
He/She/It	di̇̀rbtų	norė́tų	skaitýtų	praũstųsi	bū́tų
We^{2}	di̇̀rbtu(mė)me	norė́tu(mė)me	skaitýtu(mė)me	praũstu(mė)mės	bū́tu(mė)me
You (plural)^{2,3}	di̇̀rbtu(mė)te	norė́tu(mė)te	skaitýtu(mė)te	praũstu(mė)tės	bū́tu(mė)te
They	di̇̀rbtų	norė́tų	skaitýtų	praũstųsi	bū́tų

- ^{1}The longer form with the ending -ei is used very rarely in modern Lithuanian.

- ^{2}In modern colloquial speech the shorter forms actually retain the -mė- syllable, but remove the final -e (except for reflexive verbs): dirbtumėm, skaitytumėt.

- ^{3}A shorter form without -mė- does exist, but is used very rarely.

This mood is actively used in modern Lithuanian and one of its functions corresponds to the English conditional mood. The conditional mood is used to describe a hypothetical action that could take place if certain conditions were met (hence the name) or a desired action in present or in future: Panaikinus muitus, sumažėtų prekių kainos – Having eliminated customs duties, prices would go down. Conditional mood is used in conditional (if) sentences; this usage requires conditional mood in subordinate and main clauses if both actions are perceived as hypothetical: Visi laimėtų, jeigu priimtumėte šį pasiūlymą. – There would be a win-win situation for everyone if you accepted this offer.

Another very important function of conditional mood is the expression of purpose in final clauses (corresponds to Subjunctive mood in English): Dirbu viršvalandžius, kad uždirbčiau daugiau. – I work extra hours so that I earn more.

The third function of conditional mood is the expression of politeness: Siūlyčiau panagrinėti šią temą kitu kampu. – I would like to suggest to examine this topic from a different angle.

The perfect and inchoative forms are composed of the auxiliary verb būti in its simple conditional form and of an active participle of the main verb, matched according to gender and number of the person:

	Perfect	Inchoative
I	būčiau skaitęs / skaičiusi	būčiau beskaitąs / beskaitainti
You (singular)	būtum skaitęs / skaičiusi	būtum beskaitąs / beskaitainti
He/She/It	būtų skaitęs / skaičiusi	būtų beskaitąs / beskaitainti
We	būtume skaitę / skaičiusios	būtume beskaitą / beskaitainčios
You (plural)	būtumėte skaitę / skaičiusios	būtumėte beskaitą / beskaitainčios
They	būtų skaitę / skaičiusios	būtų beskaitą / beskaitančios

Conditional perfect is actively used in modern Lithuanian. It means a hypothetical action in the past that would have taken place if certain conditions had been met (corresponds to the semantically equivalent form in English): Vadovas būtų pritaręs renginiui, bet niekas nerodė iniciatyvos. – The leader would have approved the event, but nobody showed initiative.

Inchoative conditional means an action that could have started in the past and continued until present if certain conditions were met: Jei jis būtų paklaũsęs mano patarimo, šiandien būtų besimáudąs turtuose. – If he had listened to my advice, today he would be rolling in money. This form is obsolete.

=== Passive voice ===
In Lithuanian, passive voice is always analytical and structured differently from the active voice. Passive voice has no perfect tense and no inchoative aspect, because similar semantic relationships can be expressed by the present or past passive participle dichotomy.

Passive voice is always composed of the auxiliary verb būti in its respective tense or person and either a present passive participle or a past passive participle that must match the gender and number of the subject. Sometimes the necessity participle can be used as well. In order to avoid redundancy, the following table only includes the masculine third person, singular.

		Present passive	Past passive
Indicative mood	Present	yra baigiamas	yra baigtas
Indicative mood	Past	bùvo bai̇̃giamas	buvo baigtas^{1}
Indicative mood	Past iterative	bū́davo baigiamas	būdavo baigtas
Indicative mood	Future	bùs baigiamas	bus baigtas
Indirect mood	Present	esą̃s baigiamas	esąs baigtas
Indirect mood	Past	bùvęs baigiamas	buvęs baigtas^{1}
Indirect mood	Past iterative	bū́davęs baigiamas	būdavęs baigtas
Indirect mood	Future	bū́siąs baigiamas	būsiąs baigtas
Imperative mood		tebūnie baigiamas	tebūnie baigtas
Conditional mood		būtų baigiamas	būtų baigtas

- ^{1}This form for all persons can expressed using the passive (invariable) neuter gender participle bū́ta instead of the active participle bùvęs, usually for intransitive verbs: Prieš tai mes buvome [buvę] apsilankę muziejuje → Prieš tai mūsų būta apsilankyta muziejuje. – Before that we had gone to a museum → Before that it had been gone by us to a museum. This structure is rarely used in modern Lithuanian.

The subject of the active voice is converted to the passive voice using its possessive genitive form (hence aš, tu (I, you) converts not into manęs, tavęs, but mano, tavo): Vaikus pagimdei tu, bet užauginau aš → Vaikai buvo tavo pagimdyti, bet mano užauginti. – You gave birth to the children, but I raised them → The children were given birth by you, but raised by me. The possessive adjectives are indeclinable.

Passive voice structures with present participle are the passive equivalents of active voice simple tenses: Mokslininkai atranda tolimas planetas → Tolimos planetos yra mokslininkų atrandamos – Scientists discover distant planets → Distant planets are being discovered by scientists. Kaime bijodavo vilkų → Kaime būdavo bijoma vilkų – Village [people] used to fear wolves → Wolves used to be feared by village [people].

Passive voice structures with past participle are the passive equivalents of active voice perfect tenses: Siuntinį paštas bus pristatęs iki Kalėdų → Siuntys bus pašto pristatytas iki Kalėdų – The post office will have delivered the parcel until Christmas → The parcel will have been delivered by the post office until Christmas. Už tokį poelgį tave būtų pagerbę → Už tokį poelgį būtum pagerbtas – One would have praised you for such a behaviour → You would have been praised for such a behaviour.

Because of the flexibility offered by the neuter gender, in Lithuanian most active voice structures can be converted into passive voice, including intransitive, reflexive and even impersonal verbs. A transitive example (some or most of the English translations are literal, do not make sense in English and are shown only to give an idea):

- Tinginys valgo duoną → Duona yra tinginio valgoma – A lazy one is eating bread → Bread is being eaten by a lazy one.
- An intransitive example: Vaikai smagiai pažais ir nueis miegoti → Vaikų bus smagiai pažaista ir nueita miegoti – Children will play pleasantly and then go to sleep → It we be played pleasantly and then gone to sleep by children.
- A reflexive example: Šeimos pykdavosi dėl menkniekių → Šeimose būdavo pykstamasi dėl menkniekių – The families used to quarrel for nothing → It used to be quarrelled in the families for nothing.
- An impersonal example: Po vakarykštės audros daug prilijo → Po vakarykštės audros daug prilyta – There is a lot of rain water after yesterday's storm – It has been a lot of rain water after yesterday's storm.

Generally in modern Lithuanian absence of the subject has a very limited use (except for impersonal verbs). In cases where an active voice structure would have no subject or there is no need for it (except for impersonal verbs), a passive voice equivalent is used instead: Čia nerūko! → Čia nerūkoma! – [Nobody] smokes here! → No smoking here! (The subject would be too broad). Skubiai išnuomoja dviejų kambarių butą. → Skubiai išnuomojamas dviejų kambarių butas. [Someone] is urgently renting a two-room apartment. → A two-room apartment is urgently for rent. (The subject is not necessary).

The opposite case is true as well. If a passive voice structure has an agent expressed in the genitive case, an active voice structure is preferred: Pilietinė visuomenė turi būti skatinama vyriausybės. → (more common) Vyriausybė turi skatinti pilietinę visuomenę. – A civil society should be promoted by the government. → The government should promote a civil society.

=== Participles ===
Lithuanian retains a rich system of participles, fourteen in total. In contrast English contains just two: the present participle ("the eating cow") and the past participle ("the eaten cow").

Adjectival participles decline as adjectives, while adverbial participles are not declined..

In Lithuanian participles are very important part of every type of speech. All of them have their own function, but not all are used equally often.

==== Adjectival participles ====
Adjectival participles have all the adjectival characteristics: three genders (masculine, feminine, neuter), pronominal forms, mostly identical declension and sometimes even degrees of comparison. Their primary function is to describe a nominal part of speech (usually a noun), like any adjective would in their position, hence they are matched by gender, case and number with the noun they are describing.

They can be active or passive. In the following tables only nominative case forms are given.

The verb used is bai̇̃gti (to finish).

Active (non pronominal forms):

	Simple			Reflexive		
	Masculine	Feminine	Neuter	Masculine	Feminine	Neuter
Present	baigią̃s / bai̇̃giantis	bai̇̃gianti	baigią̃	besibaigią̃s / besibai̇̃giantis / bai̇̃giąsis	besibai̇̃gianti / bai̇̃giantis	besibaigią̃ / baigią̃si
Past	bai̇̃gęs	bai̇̃gusi	bai̇̃gę	bai̇̃gęsis	bai̇̃gusis	bai̇̃gęsi
Past iterative	bai̇̃gdavęs	bai̇̃gdavusi	bai̇̃gdavę	bai̇̃gdavęsis	bai̇̃gdavusis	bai̇̃gdavęsi
Future	baigsią̃s / bai̇̃gsiantis	bai̇̃gsianti	baigsią̃	bai̇̃gsiąsis	bai̇̃gsiantis	bai̇̃gsiąsi

Active (pronominal counterparts):

	Simple			Reflexive		
	Masculine	Feminine	Neuter	Masculine	Feminine	Neuter
Present	baigiantỹsis	baigiančióji	–	besibaigiantỹsis	besibaigiančióji	–
Past	baigusỹsis	baigusióji	–	(pa)sibaigusỹsis^{1}	(pa)sibaigusióji^{1}	–
Past iterative	–	–	–	–	–	–
Future	baigsiantỹsis	baigsiančióji	–	(pa)sibaigsiantỹsis^{1}	(pa)sibaigsiančióji^{1}	–

- ^{1}This form only exists for verbs with prefixes (except for be-).

- One of the main functions of active participles is to describe a characteristic of a noun related to some ongoing, past or future action in which the said noun is the agent: migruojantys paukščiai – migrating birds, nepatyręs vairuotojas – inexperienced driver, pablogėsiančios darbo sąlygos – working conditions that will worsen. Only present, past simple and future active participles can fulfill this function.
- Another function of active participles is to describe a secondary action performed by the sentence subject before the main action: Atidariusi langą mergina grožėjosi tekančia saule. – Having opened the window, the girl admired the sunrise. This function is limited to the past simple participle and is one of its most common uses. If there is a need to describe a secondary action performed by the sentence subject at the same time as the main action, the pusdalyvis must be used instead (present active participle does not have this function): Atidarydama langą mergina grožėjosi tekančia saule. – While opening the window, the girl admired the sunrise. See "Adverbial participles" for further explanation.
- The third, a somewhat rarer, function is to explain (precise) another verb by indicating a secondary action of which the subject is the agent: Kaltinamasis prisipažįsta padaręs nusikaltimą ir labai dėl to gailisi. – The defendant confesses having committed the crime and sincerely regrets it. If the subject is not the agent expressed in the nominative case of a noun or a pronoun, an adverbial participle must be used instead.

Passive (non pronominal forms):

	Simple			Reflexive		
	Masculine	Feminine	Neuter	Masculine	Feminine	Neuter
Present	bai̇̃giamas	baigiamà	bai̇̃giama	(už)sibai̇̃giamas^{2}	(už)sibaigiamà^{2}	bai̇̃giamasi
Past	bai̇̃gtas	baigtà	bai̇̃gta	(už)si̇̀baigtas^{2}	(už)sibaigtà^{2}	bai̇̃gtasi
Past iterative	—					
Future	bai̇̃gsimas	baigsimà	bai̇̃gsima	(už)sibai̇̃gsimas^{2}	(už)sibaigsimà^{2}	bai̇̃gsimasi
Necessity	bai̇̃gtinas	baigtinà	bai̇̃gtina	(už)sibai̇̃gtinas^{2}	(už)sibaigtinà^{2}	bai̇̃gtinasi

Passive (pronominal counterparts):

	Simple			Reflexive		
	Masculine	Feminine	Neuter	Masculine	Feminine	Neuter
Present	baigiamàsis	baigiamóji	–	(už)sibaigiamàsis^{2}	(už)sibaigiamóji^{2}	–
Past	baigtàsis	baigtóji	–	(už)sibaigtàsis^{2}	(už)sibaigtóji^{2}	–
Past iterative	—					
Future	baigsimàsis	baigsimóji	–	(už)sibaigsimàsis^{2}	(už)sibaigsimóji^{2}	–
Necessity	baigtinàsis	baigtinóji	–	(už)sibaigtinàsis^{2}	(už)sibaigtinóji^{2}	–

- ^{2}This form only exists for transitive verbs with prefixes (except for be-). In Lithuanian reflexive verbs can be transitive: susipinti plaukus – to plait one's hair [to oneself].

Passive voice present participles and the necessity participles can acquire degrees of comparison if their meaning allows it: mėgti (to like) → liked (favourite), mėgstamesnis (more liked), mėgstamiausias (most liked/favorite); būti (to be) → būtinas (necessary), būtinesnis (more necessary), būtiniausias (the most necessary).

The necessity participles are used to describe something that has to be done: Įsidėmėtinos rašybos atvejis – A spelling case one has to pay special attention to. Abejotina, ar mums pavyks – It is to be doubted if we succeed. Mostly limited to official styles, but certain participles are actively used in colloquial speech as well, some of them being considered more adjectives than verbs: Jis suimtas už pasibaisėtiną elgesį su gyvūnais – He was arrested for an appalling behaviour with animals. (Pasibaisėtinas = one that has to be detested).

Main passive participles mainly denote actions that have impact upon nouns they describe: statomas namas – a house that is being built, iškeltas klausimas – a question that has been raised, vykdysimas įsakymas – an order that will be obeyed. Future passive participles are rare in modern speech.

Present passive participles very often have an active meaning, especially if the verb is intransitive, and are one of the terminology building tools: kuliamoji mašina – a threshing machine, taupomasis bankas – a savings bank, grįžtamasis ryšys – a feedback. If the verb is transitive, it can be used in its intransitive meaning in form of a present passive participle: gydomasis vanduo – healing water. Compare: geriamasis vanduo – drinking water. The difference in those cases is only semantic (water cannot be healed, thus it is accepted that gydomasis vanduo denotes water having healing properties, but not water being healed).

==== Adverbial participles ====
As the name suggests, adverbial participles have the characteristics of an adverb and are used to describe the verb instead of the subject. There are three types of such participles: padalyvis ("sub-participle"), pusdalyvis ("half-participle") and būdinys ("descriptive participle"). These forms are not conjugatable, although the pusdalyvis has feminine and masculine genders for both singular and plural. These forms do not have equivalents in English or other languages (except Latvian), the given translations of these names are ad hoc.

	Simple	Reflexive
Present padalyvis	bai̇̃giant	bai̇̃giantis
Past padalyvis	bai̇̃gus	bai̇̃gusis
Past iterative padalyvis	bai̇̃gdavus	bai̇̃gdavusis
Future padalyvis	bai̇̃gsiant	bai̇̃gsiantis
Pusdalyvis	bai̇̃gdamas (m. sg.), baigdamà (f. sg.)	bai̇̃gdamasis (m. sg.), bai̇̃gdamasi (f. sg.)
Pusdalyvis	baigdami̇̀ (m. pl.), bai̇̃gdamos (f. pl.)	bai̇̃gdamiesi (m. pl.), bai̇̃gdomosi (f. pl.)
Būdinys (I)	baigtè	–
Būdinys (II)	baigtinai̇̃	–

- The primary function of the padalyvis is to indicate an action that is happening at the same time (present padalyvis) or before (past padalyvis) the event said with the main verb, of which the sentence subject is not the agent: Lauko darbus mes dirbome saulei šviečiant (present padalyvis) – We were doing the field works the sun shining; Skaniai pavalgius malonu pamiegoti (past padalyvis) – Having eaten a delicious meal, it is pleasant to take a nap.
- The primary function of the pusdalyvis is to indicate a simultaneous, but secondary action done by the sentence subject in nominative case (it must be matched according to gender and number with the said subject): Lauko darbus mes dirbome dainuodami – We were doing the field works while singing. In this case the present padalyvis participle can be used as well: Lauko darbus mes dirbome dainuojant, but this time the sentence will mean: We were doing the field works while someone else was singing. A secondary action done previously by the sentence subject can be expressed with adjectival past simple participle: Lauko darbus mes dirbome padainavę – We were doing the field works having sung. When used with the preposition prieš (before), pusdalyvis and padalyvis denote a secondary action in future: Lauko darbus mes dirbome prieš dainuodami. – We were doing the field works before singing. Lauko darbus mes dirbome prieš dainuojant. – We were doing the field works before someone else started to sing.

This table shows the participle usage in temporal adverbial phrases:

	Past action	Simultaneous action	Future action
Sentence subject is the agent	Past simple adjectival participle	Pusdalyvis	Prieš + pusdalyvis
Sentence subject is not the agent	Past padalyvis	Present padalyvis	Prieš + padalyvis

- Another function of the padalyvis is to explain (precise) another verb by indicating a secondary action of which the subject is not the agent: Vartydamas seną albumą, prisiminiau mus šiame ežere maudydavusis – While seeing an old photo album, I remembered us having used to swim in this lake. If the subject is the agent, an adjectival participle must be used instead.

This table shows the participle usage as an object.:

	Simultaneous action	Past action	Multiple actions in the past	Future action
Sentence subject is the agent	Present adjectival active participle	Past simple adjectival active participle	Past iterative adjectival active participle	Future adjectival active participle
Sentence subject is not the agent	Present padalyvis	Past padalyvis	Past iterative padalyvis	Future padalyvis

- The būdinys (the descriptive or intensifying participle) reinforces the meaning of the verb being described: Šaukte šaukiausi pagalbos, niekas neatsiliepė – I was shouting loudly for help, nobody answered. Type I būdinys is used relatively often in some written and colloquial speech. Type II būdinys is very rare and can only be found in literary language. Their primary function is the same. In some grammars they are not considered verbs, but adverbs derived from verbs.

=== Grammatical aspect ===
All Lithuanian verbs can be characterized by their aspect which can be either perfective or imperfective. Nevertheless, this important dichotomy is semantical, rather than expressed by purely grammatical means. Formally distinguishing an imperfective verb from its perfective counterpart is not possible, since those forms are not mutually exclusive or interdependent. Moreover, certain grammatical categories (like past iterative tense) automatically negate any perfectiveness a certain verb might have in infinitive or in other tenses. The opposite is true as well: a different tense (like an inchoative or perfect tense) of an otherwise imperfective verb automatically grants a perfective meaning. Contrary to modern Slavonic languages, each and every Lithuanian verb, in spite of its aspect, has all tenses and forms described in previous chapters of this article.

Nevertheless, certain very general rules can be laid down to detect the aspect of a verb in Lithuanian.

The imperfective aspect of a verb means the continuity of an action or a repetitiveness of a completed action. The imperfective aspect can sometimes be implied by:

- The absence of a prefix for certain verbs: di̇̀rbti – to be working, šaũkti – to be shouting, kri̇̀sti – to be falling.
- The presence of a suffix (except for -er(ė)ti, -el(ė)ti) combined with the absence of a prefix for certain verbs: maldáuti – to be begging, mė́tyti – to be throwing [multiple times], šokinė́ti – to be jumping [constantly, multiple times].
- The impossibility for certain verbs to be used without a prefix: užgaulióti – to be bullying, pãsakoti – to be telling a story.
- The complete or partial change of meaning for certain prefixed verbs: priklausýti – to be in possession (from klausýti – to listen), pakę̃sti – to tolerate (from kę̃sti – to suffer), atsidúoti – to be stinking (from dúoti – to give).
- For some prefixed verbs that merely indicate the ability to do something: panèšti – to be able to carry, nusėdė́ti – to be able to sit.

The perfective aspect of a verb means the completeness of an action. The perfective aspect can sometimes be implied by:

- The presence of a prefix for certain verbs: padi̇̀rbti – to work for a certain amount of time, pašaũkti – to call, nukri̇̀sti – to fall. There are very few perfective prefixed verbs that would distinguish themselves from their imperfective unprefixed counterparts only by their perfective meaning, since any prefix almost always has a semantical nuance.
- The presence of the suffix -er(ė)ti or -el(ė)ti: di̇̀rsterėti – to take a glimpse, kúoktelėti – to become insane.

In other cases the aspect is contextual. This might sometimes be implied by:

- The absence of a suffix and a prefix for certain verbs:

– mèsti – to throw:

Vakar mečiau darbą – I quit my job yesterday. (perfective)

Visas senas knygas jis metė į šiukšlių dėžę – He was throwing all the old books to the trash bin. (imperfective)

– grį̇̃žti – to come back:

Grįžęs namo, virtuvėje rasi sriubos. – Having come back home, you'll find some soup in the kitchen. (perfective)

Grįžtu namo, kol saulė dar nenusileido – I'm going home as the sun is not yet down. (imperfective)

- A specific tense in some other cases:

– laimė́ti – to win:

Kol kas mūsų komanda laimi – For the meantime our team is winning. (present tense, imperfective)

mūsų komanda laimėjo dideliu skirtumu – Our team [has] won by a big difference. (past simple tense, perfective)

=== Verb prefixes ===
==== General usage notes ====
Prefixes are added to verbs to make new verbs that have different color of the primary verb's meaning. The new verb and the primary verb are considered different words, taking different positions in vocabularies. However their meanings are related, often showing similarity to being forms of a single verb. In many instances a prefixed verb has no apparent semantical relationship with the primary verb. Prefixes have mostly restrictive sense, so they restrict the meaning of the primary not prefixed verb to certain direction, amount or limit of time.

- ap- round (direction, perfective), about, around
- api- is a variant of ap- before b or p
- at- off; from, from somewhere (direction; place, perfective); at (with 'moving towards' verbs)
- ati- is a variant of at- before d or t
- į- in (direction, perfective), into, be able to (imperfective)
- iš- out (direction, perfective), ex-
- nu- away (direction), from the start place (action with some direction, perfective); down
- pa- sub-, under (direction, perfective); definite, terminating on continuous (< after), a bit, slightly, some time (time or amount, imperfective), till end (for single actions, cf su-, time or amount, perfective)
  - ima - 'it takes'
  - pa-ima - 'it takes and finishes it'
  - ėmė - 'it was taking', 'it has been taking', 'it had been taking'
  - pa-ėmė - 'it took'
- par- back, similar to English (Latin) re- (with some differences; perfective)
- per- through (place, perfective), over, across, thoroughly, completely (perfective)
- pra- by (direction, perfective), through, between, starting (time, perfective rarely)
- pri- up, to (direction or place, perfective), close to, to the place (of the action) (place, perfective), much, many (amount, sometimes perfective)
- su- together (place, perfective), from everywhere (direction), till end (time, perfective), completely (long or complex action, perfective)
- už- on (direction or place), completely (short action, cf. su-, perfective)
- už- behind (direction, perfective), in (for limited time, cf į-) (direction and time, perfective), suddenly, unexpectedly (time, perfective)

There are also three special modifying prefixes that can be used with other prefixed or unprefixed (including reflexive) verbs. They define different forms of the same verb, rather than a new verb:

- ne- is a prefix that makes negative form of a verb: turiù – I have, neturiù – I haven't.
- be- says that an action of a verb:

– takes an undefined amount of time: Šitaip bedirbant galima susigadinti sveikatą – Working [for a long time] like that one can damage one's health. This function allows be- to be used as a dummy prefix for reflexive present tense participles. In that case the reflexive formant moves right after the prefix, thus avoiding the formation of a complex reflexive ending: džiaũgtis – to rejoice → džiaũgiantisis – the one (masc., sg. nominative) who rejoices, but more commonly: besidžiaũgiantis. Other forms besides nominative (džiaũgiančiasis – the ones (fem., pl. accusative) who rejoice) are not used at all in favour of besidžiaũgiančias etc.

– may be interrupted (see "Inchoative tenses");

– is restrictive (a combination of English "only" and "still"): Ligoninėje jį motina beaplanko – Only his mother still visits him to the hospital.

- te- indicates:

– that an action of a verb is restrictive (equivalent of English "only"): Ligoninėje jį motina teaplanko – Only his mother visits him to the hospital;

– the 3rd person of the imperative mood (see "Imperative mood").

- tebe- indicates that an action of a verb is still ongoing (equivalent of English "still"): Ligoninėje jį motina tebeaplanko – His mother still visits him to the hospital.
- nebe- indicates that an action of a verb is no longer ongoing (equivalent of English "no longer"): Ligoninėje jo motina nebeaplanko – His mother no longer visits him to the hospital.
- A verb cannot acquire more than one prefix, except for ne-, te-, be-, nebe- or tebe-. Only very few words are exception from this.
- The indicator of reflexion -si is used between the prefix and the root if the verb is prefixed, e. g.

nẽšasi but nusi̇̀neša, atsi̇̀neša
laikýtis but susilaikýti, pasilaikýti
teiráutis but pasiteiráuti

- The same rule is applied, when ne-, be-, nebe-, te- or tebe- is added:

nẽšasi but nesi̇̀neša, nebesi̇̀neša, also nenusi̇̀neša, neatsi̇̀neša, tebeatsi̇̀neša
laikýtis, but nesilaikýti, also nesusilaikýti, nepasilaikýti
teiráutis but nesiteiráuti, also nepasiteiráuti

==== Stress retraction ====
Certain Lithuanian verbs have the ability to move their stress to the last prefixed element they acquire. General stress retraction principles are laid down below.

All prefixes (including ne- type, but not including the prefix per-) acquire the stress only in:

- past simple tense forms of primary (monosyllabic stem) verbs. This always happens when the 3rd person has an -ė ending, its stress would normally fall on its penultimate syllable and this syllable has a short vowel or a rising tone:

baũsti (to punish, monosyllabic stem verb) → baũdė (stress on the penultimate, rising tone) → nùbaudė, nebenùbaudė etc.
vi̇̀rti (to boil, monosyllabic stem verb) → vi̇̀rė (stress on the penultimate, short vowel) → i̇̀švirė, nebeišsi̇̀virė etc.
kláusti (to ask, monosyllabic stem verb) → kláusė (stress on the penultimate, falling tone, the rule does not apply) → pakláusė
darýti (to ask, suffixal verb, the rule does not apply) → dãrė (stress on the penultimate, rising tone) → padãrė

- Some present tense forms (primary or mixed stem), but only if the stress of the 3rd person falls on its penultimate syllable, this syllable is not a suffix and has a short vowel or a rising tone:

kalbė́ti (to speak, suffixal verb) → kal̃ba (stress on the penultimate, no suffix, rising tone) → sùkalba, tebesi̇̀kalba etc.
sukti (to turn, primary verb) → sùka (stress on the penultimate, no suffix, short vowel) → pàsuka, nèsuka etc.

- Past simple accent retraction is regular, present tense accent retraction is sporadic. If a particular verb retracts its accent in one tense, it does not mean that the other tense will follow suit.
- The accent retraction does not depend on a particular prefix (except for per-) and will systematically happen with every other prefixed structure (a prefix, a ne- type prefix or a reflexive formant). It means that even if dictionaries never include ne- type prefixes, the stress retraction can be deduced from other prefixed forms that dictionaries do include:

plaũkti (to swim) → išplaũkti (to swim out) → išplaũkia (no retraction, hence: neišplaũkia, teišplaũkia etc.)
riñkti (to gather) → suriñkti (to gather them all) → sùrenka (retraction does happen, hence: nèrenka, tèrenka etc.)

- The latter rule has two exceptions:

turė́ti (to have) → suturė́ti (to restrain) → sùturi (retraction does happen, but not for ne- type prefixes of the non-prefixed verbs: netùri, tetùri etc.)
galė́ti (to be able) → išgalė́ti (to afford) → i̇̀šgali (retraction does happen, but not for ne- type prefixes of the non-prefixed verbs: negãli, begãli etc.)

- The prefix pér- always has the falling tone and takes the stress in all parts of speech of that word, ignoring all the other accentuation rules: pérduoti – to transmit, nebepérsivalgymas – the inability to overeat.

=== Stem classes ===
The below given tables are not a full collection of types of conjugation, there can be types in language not included here.

Consonants d, t become s before t in any case in language. In verbs this occurs before a desinence -ti of the infinitive, desinence with -t- of the past passive participle.

==== Non-suffixed ====
infinitive	present tense			past tense			meaning
infinitive	1p. sg.	2p. sg.	3p. sg., pl.	1p. sg.	2p. sg.	3p. sg., pl.	meaning
Consonantal non-palatalized stems (it is palatalized in the 2p. form of the present, but not in the remaining forms). Sounds of a stem do not change in conjugation, except for a common pre-desinential alternation between historically nasal vowels (in the infinitive) and nasal diphthongs.
áugti	áugu	áugi	áuga	áugau	áugai	augo	to grow
bė́gti	bė́gu	bė́gi	bė́ga	bė́gau	bė́gai	bė́go	to run
šókti	šóku	šóki	šóka	šókau	šókai	šóko	to jump, spring, leap; hop in, out; dance
di̇̀rbti	di̇̀rbu	di̇̀rbi	di̇̀rba	di̇̀rbau	di̇̀rbai	di̇̀rbo	to work
sė́sti	sė́du	sė́di	sė́da	sė́dau	sė́dai	sė́do	to sit down, sit up; mount, get on (car, plain etc.)
grū́sti	grū́du	grū́di	grū́da	grū́dau	grū́dai	grū́do	to thrust; hustle; pestle; tamp
žį̇́sti	ži̇̀ndu	ži̇̀ndi	ži̇̀nda	ži̇̀ndau	ži̇̀ndai	ži̇̀ndo	to suck, nurse (at)
ką́sti	kándu	kándi	kánda	kándau	kándai	kándo	to bite
galą́sti	galándu	galandi	galánda	galándau	galandai	galándo	to sharpen, hone
li̇̀pti	lipù	lipi̇̀	li̇̀pa	lipaũ	lipai̇̃	li̇̀po	to mount; tread (on); scale, climb
ki̇̀šti	kišù	kiši̇̀	ki̇̀ša	kišaũ	kišai̇̃	ki̇̀šo	to put, slip, poke, stick in
ri̇̀sti	ritù	riti̇̀	ri̇̀ta	ritaũ	ritai̇̃	ri̇̀to	to roll, bowl
sukti	suku	suki	suka	sukau	sukai	suko	to turn; bear (to); spin; wrap
supti	supu	supi	supa	supau	supai	supo	to swing, sway, rock
lupti	lupu	lupi	lupa	lupau	lupai	lupo	to peel; flay; swinge, thrash
skùsti	skutù	skuti̇̀	skùta	skutaũ	skutai̇̃	skùto	to shave; scale, peel, scrape; run fast
There is a frequent verb with its final stem consonant palatalized in the present tense.
léisti	léidžiu	leidi	leidžia	leidau	leidai	leido	to let, allow; spend
Alternation between pre-desinential e of the present tense and i of the other forms. Possible only when the syllable contains a mixed diphthong (a, e, i, u + sonorant) and is stressed in the end-firm accent.
sir̃gti	sergù	sergi̇̀	ser̃ga	sirgaũ	sirgai̇̃	sir̃go	to be ill
kirsti	kertu	kerti	kerta	kirtau	kirtai	kirto	to cut, fell (by axe); cross, traverse; strike, smite; pitch in (food)
vilkti	velku	velki	velka	vilkau	vilkai	vilko	to pull, trail, drag
tilpti	telpu	telpi	telpa	tilpau	tilpai	tilpo	to get / have enough of space for oneself: be contained, go into
rinkti	renku	renki	renka	rinkau	rinkai	rinko	to pick; collect
lįsti	lendu	lendi	lenda	lindau	lindai	lindo	to be getting into / through smth.; make a pass at, intrude, molest, cavil, meddle
A numerous part of the verbs having any short vowel – a, e, i, u – in a pre-desinential syllable in infinitive receive n, m (the latter when before p, b) after these vowels in the present.
tàpti	tampù	tampi̇̀	tam̃pa	tapaũ	tapai̇̃	tãpo	to become
rasti	randu	randi	rañda	radau	radai	rãdo	to find
gesti	gendu	gendi	genda	gedau	gedai	gedo	to deteriorate; decay; spoil; corrupt
tikti	tinku	tinki	tinka	tikau	tikai	tiko	to fit
tekti	tenku	tenki	tenka	tekau	tekai	teko	to go for (property)
apnikti	apninku	apninki	apninka	apnikau	apnikai	apniko	to obsess, crowd in
migti	mingu	mingi	minga	migau	migai	migo	to be / start falling asleep
lipti	limpu	limpi	limpa	lipau	lipai	lipo	to stick, cling
plisti	plintu	plinti	plinta	plitau	plitai	plito	to spread, proliferate, circulate
misti	mintu	minti	minta	mitau	mitai	mito	to feed on, fare, live on
kisti	kintu	kinti	kinta	kitau	kitai	kito	to mutate; vary
švisti	švintu	švinti	švinta	švitau	švitai	švito	to begin to light, esp. to day-light
blukti	blunku	blunki	blunka	blukau	blukai	bluko	to fade
klupti	klumpu	klumpi	klumpa	klupau	klupai	klupo	to stumble
justi	juntu	junti	junta	jutau	jutai	juto	to sense, feel
A small group of verbs has to be written with a nosinė in the present.
balti	bąlu	bąli	bąla	balau	balai	balo	to become white, to whiten
šalti	šąla	šąli	šąla	šalau	šalai	šalo	to freeze; to cool; to feel cold
karti	kąra	kąri	kąra	karau	karai	karo	to incline, bow down (hung things, boughs)
For the verbs that have start-firm accented mixed diphthongs -il-, -ir- in the pre-desinential syllable in the infinitive, the vowel i lengthens and receives the end-firm accent in the present tense, if the syllable becomes open.
ki̇̀lti	kylù	kyli	kỹla	kilau	kilai	kilo	to rise; emerge (e.g. question)
dilti	dylu	dyli	dyla	dilau	dilai	dilo	to fray, decay, become dull
birti	byru	byri	byra	birau	birai	biro	to pour (solid, no liquid matter), fall apart
irti	yru / irstu	yri	yra	irau	irai	iro	to disintegrate, decay, crumble
Cases of alternation between a pre-desinential e of the present tense and i of the other forms in verbs which receive n, m in the present forms. The a-verb likti has i.e. / i alternation. The a-verb kristi can be conjugated with both -en- and -in- in the present tense.
skristi	skrendù	skrendi	skrenda	skridau	skridai	skrido	to fly
bristi	brendu	brendi	brenda	bridau	bridai	brido	to wade, go on foot through water, grass etc.
kristi	krentu /krintu	krenti	krinta	kritau	kritai	krito	to fall
likti	lieku	lieki	lieka	likau	likai	liko	to remain
Stems that are palatalized in the past tense.
ėsti	ė́du	ėdi	ėda	ė́džiau	ėdei	ėdė	to eat (for animals); eat like an animal; erode
vesti	vedù	vedi	veda	vedžiaũ	vedei	vedė	to lead, take smb. to somewhere; marry (for a man; for a woman the a-verb is tekėti, teka, tekėjo)
mèsti	metù	meti	meta	mečiau	metei	metė	to throw
vežti	vežu	veži	veža	vežiau	vežei	vežė	to carry by means of conveyance, by vehicle
nešti	nešu	neši	neša	nešiau	nešei	nešė	to carry (going on foot)
kasti	kasu	kasi	kasa	kasiau	kasei	kasė	to dig
lesti	lesu	lesi	lesa	lesiau	lesei	lesė	to peck
sekti	seku	seki	seka	sekiau	sekei	sekė	to follow; spy (on, upon); tell a tail
kepti	kepu	kepi	kepa	kepiau	kepei	kepė	to bake
degti	degu	degi	dega	degiau	degei	degė	to be on fire, burn; kiln
megzti	mezgu	mezgi	mezga	mezgiau	mezgei	mezgė	to knit
zùiti	zujù	zuji	zuja	zujau	zujai	zujo	to pop in and out
kálti	kalù	kali	kala	kaliau	kalei	kalė	to hammer, smith, batter; mint; chisel; hit
málti	malu	mali	mala	maliau	malei	malė	to grind, mill
bár̃ti	barù	bari	bara	bariau	barei	barė	to scold, trim
The a-verb pulti has alternation between u in the infinitive and uo in the present and past tenses. Verbs gimti, mirti have the suffix -st- in the present.
pùlti	púolu	puoli	puola	púoliau	puolei	puolė	to attack; fling, throw oneself, make a dive
gi̇̀mti	gi̇̀mstu	gimsti	gimsta	gimiaũ	gimei	gimė	to be born, arrive
mir̃ti	mi̇̀rštu	miršti	miršta	miriaũ	mirei	mirė	to die, stop living
For the verbs of this group that have start-firm accented mixed diphthongs starting in i – im, in, il, ir – in a pre-desinential syllable in the infinitive, the syllable becomes open and a vowel i lengthens (the accent remains start-firm) in the past tense.
pi̇̀lti	pilù	pili	pila	pýliau	pylei	pylė	to pour (any non solid material); tip
tirti	tiriu	tiri	tiria	tyriau	tyrei	tyrė	to investigate; analyse; research
skinti	skinu	skini	skina	skyniau	skynei	skynė	to pluck (fruits, flowers etc.)
pinti	pinu	pini	pina	pyniau	pynei	pynė	to plait; weave; pleach
trinti	trinu	trini	trina	tryniau	trynei	trynė	to rub
minti	minu	mini	mina	myniau	mynei	mynė	to step, tread (on); trample; treadle
ginti	ginu	gini	gina	gyniau	gynei	gynė	to defend
im̃ti	imù	imi	ima	ėmiaũ	ėmei̇̃	ė̃mė	to take
There are some verbs having mixed diphthongs in a pre-desinential syllable that have alternation between pre-desinential e of the present tense and i of the other forms. A sound i of a pre-desinential syllable is not lengthened in the past tense. The a-verb virti has d insterted after -er- in the present tense.
atsimiñti	atsi̇̀menu	atsimeni	atsimena	atsi̇̀miniau	atsiminei	atsiminė	to remember, recollect
miñti	menù	meni	mena	miniaũ	minei	minė	to riddle, ask a riddle
giñti	genù	geni	gena	giniau	ginei	ginė	to herd, goad, drive
vi̇̀rti	vérdu	verdi	verda	viriaũ	virei̇̃	vi̇̀rė	to boil (figur. as well); cook (by boiling)
Consonantal non-palatalized stems that have suffix -st- in the present. There are many verbs in this group. When the suffix is preceded by d, t of a stem, these consonants merge with s and s remains, when it is preceded by ž, š of a stem, the remaining are stem-ending consonants ž, š.
sprógti	sprógstu	sprogsti	sprógsta	sprógau	sprogai	sprogo	to explode, burst; eat (get stomach filled)
plýšti	plýštu	plyšti	plyšta	plyšau	plyšai	plyšo	to tear, rip, split; (coll.) get drunk
klysti	klystu	klysti	klysta	klydau	klydai	klydo	to mistake, err, be under misapprehension
linkti	linkstu	linksti	linksta	linkau	linkai	linko	to bend (itself)
rūgti	rūgstu	rūgsti	rūgsta	rūgau	rūgai	rūgo	to sour, become turned
tolti	tolstu	tolsti	tolsta	tolau	tolai	tolo	to become remote, distant, to recede
alkti	alkstu	alksti	alksta	alkau	alkai	alko	to become, be hungry; to be short of food
paži̇̀nti	pažį̇́stu	pažįsti	pažįsta	pažinaũ	pažinai	pažino	to become familiar, to explore; recognize
pažinoti	pažį̇́stu	pažįsti	pažįsta	pažinojau	pažinojai	pažinojo	to know smb., be acquaintance with smb.
pỹkti	pykstù	pyksti	pỹksta	pykaũ	pykai	pyko	to be angry, annoyed
nykti	nykstu	nyksti	nyksta	nykau	nykai	nyko	to dwindle, wither away, vanish, disappear
rausti	raustu	rausti	rausta	raudau	raudai	raudo	to become red, to redden; to blush
brangti	brangstu	brangsti	brangsta	brangau	brangai	brango	to become expensive
išsigąsti	išsigąstu	išsigąsti	išsigąsta	išsigando	išsigandai	išsigando	to get a scare, fright; to lose courage
vargti	vargstu	vargsti	vargsta	vargau	vargai	vargo	to have difficulties doing; be in hardship
širsti	širstu	širsti	širsta	širdau	širdai	širdo	to be angry (širdis – heart)
dingti	dingstu	dingsti	dingsta	dingau	dingai	dingo	to disappear
klimpti	klimpstu	klimpsti	klimpsta	klimpau	klimpai	klimpo	to sink (to viscous material)
drįsti	drįstu	drįsti	drįsta	drįsau	drįsai	drįso	to dare
grįžti	grįžtu	grįžti	grįžta	grįžau	grįžai	grįžo	to come back, return
A small group of stems ending in ž, š, has to be written with an ogonek in the present.
gesti	gęstu	gęsti	gęsta	gesau	gesai	geso	to be stopping (intransitive) shining, burning, working (for light, fire; life; motor)
težti	tęžtu	tęžti	tęžta	težau	težai	težo	to become squidgy; wimp out
For a few stems that have a pre-desinential syllable ending in ž or š and with a short i or u in it, the vowels lengthen in the present. For tikšti the forms tykšta and tyška are used in the present tense.
dùžti			dū̃žta			dùžo	to smash, chip
gižti			gyžta			gižo	to sour, become turned (figur. as well)
tikšti			tykšta			tiško	to splash on smth., smb.
tižti			tyžta			tižo	to become squidgy; wimp out
ižti			yžta			ižo	to crack (usual for ice)
nižti			nyžta			nižo	to start itching, to itch
Vocalic stems. The consonant n (or j in dialects) is inserted before desinences after a pre-desinential au. The diphthong becomes ov in the past, when start-firm accented. Consonant v is palatalized.
ei̇̃ti	einù	eini	ei̇̃na	ėjaũ	ėjai	ė̃jo	to go
aũti	aunù	auni	aũna	aviaũ	avei	ãvė	to boot, shoe
máuti	máunu	máuni	máuna	móviau	movei	movė	to put on, glove, shoe
rauti	raunu	rauni	rauna	roviau	rovei	rovė	to tear up
šauti	šaunu	šauni	šauna	šoviau	šovei	šovė	to shoot
brautis	braunuosi	brauniesi	braunasi	broviausi	broveisi	brovėsi	to intrude; thrust one's way; be breaking in
liautis	liaujuosi	liaujiesi	liaujasi	lioviausi	lioveisi	liovėsi	to cease, desist
griauti	griaunu	griauni	griauna	grioviau	griovei	griovė	to ruin, demolish; unsettle
Consonant v / n is inserted after ū.
griū̃ti	griūvù /-nù	griūni	griū̃va	griuvaũ	griuvai	griùvo	to tumble down, fall down; collapse
žūti	žūnu /-vu	žūni	žūva	žuvau	žuvai	žuvo	to perish
pūti	pūvu /-nu	pūni	pūva	puvau	puvai	puvo	to rot
siūti	siuvu /siūnu	siuvi	siuva	siuvau	siuvai	siuvo	to sew, stitch
gáuti	gáunu	gauni	gauna	gavaũ	gavai	gãvo	to get
The consonant j is inserted before desinences after other pre-desinential vowels or diphthong 'ie'
móti	móju	moji	moja	mójau	mojai	mojo	to motion, wave, sweep
ploti	ploju	ploji	ploja	plojau	plojai	plojo	to clap, applaud; flatten; swat
joti	joju	joji	joja	jojau	jojai	jojo	to ride on horse
goti	goju	goji	goja	gojau	gojai	gojo	(dial.) to go in a hurry
kloti	kloju	kloji	kloja	klojau	klojai	klojo	to lay, pave; to tell, report, retail; to make a bed (lovą);
groti	groju	groji	groja	grojau	grojai	grojo	to play (musical instrument)
sėti	sėju	sėji	sėja	sėjau	sėjai	sėjo	to sow, seed; disseminate
sieti	sieju	sieji	sieja	siejau	siejai	siejo	to tie, associate, bond
lieti	lieju	lieji	lieja	liejau	liejai	liejo	to pour (liquid); water (plants)
lýti			lỹja			lijo	to rain
gýti	gyjù	gyji	gỹja	gijaũ	gijai	gijo	to heal, recover
rýti	ryjù	ryji	ryja	rijau	rijai	rijo	to swallow; guttle
výti	vejù	veji	veja	vijau	vijai	vijo	to strand, twist; chase
Two verbs have d insterted before the desinences in the present forms.
dúoti	dúodu	duodi	dúoda	daviaũ	davei	davė	to give
dė́ti	dedù	dedi	dẽda	dėjau	dė́jai	dėjo	to put, lay, set; place
Palatalized consonantal stems. Maybe the most numerous group of non-suffixed verbs.
siẽkti	siekiù	sieki	siẽkia	siekiaũ	siekei	siekė	to seek, aim (at, for)
griebti	griebiu	griebi	griebia	griebiau	griebei	griebė	to grab; snatch
braukti	braukiu	brauki	braukia	braukiau	braukei	braukė	to wipe, sweep across; line through
lenkti	lenkiu	lenki	lenkia	lenkiau	lenkei	lenkė	to (make it) bend
rausti	rausiu	rausi	rausia	rausiau	rausei	rausė	to trench, burrow
kaupti	kaupiu	kaupi	kaupia	kaupiau	kaupei	kaupė	to save up, gather, amass
mer̃kti	merkiù	merki̇̀	mer̃kia	merkiaũ	merkei̇̃	mer̃kė	to soak, dip
dengti	dengiu	dengi	dengia	dengiau	dengei	dengė	to cover
tęsti	tęsiu	tęsi	tęsia	tęsiau	tęsei	tęsė	to continue, proceed; drag, carry
čiulpti	čiulpiu	čiulpi	čiulpia	čiulpiau	čiulpei	čiulpė	to suck
láužti	láužiu	lauži	laužia	láužiau	laužei	laužė	to break (transitive)
grėbti	grėbiu	grėbi	grėbia	grėbiau	grėbei	grėbė	to rake
grobti	grobiu	grobi	grobia	grobiau	grobei	grobė	to plunder; kidnap; usurp, hog
mérkti	mérkiu	mérki	mérkia	mérkiau	mérkei	mérkė	to give a wink; to close eyes
melžti	melžiu	melži	melžia	melžiau	melžei	melžė	to milk
jùngti	jùngiu	jungi	jungia	jungiau	jungei	jungė	to connect, join
keisti	keičiu	keiti	keičia	keičiau	keitei	keitė	to change
švęsti	švenčiu	šventi	švenčia	švenčiau	šventei	šventė	to celebrate
siųsti	siunčiu	siunti	siunčia	siunčiau	siuntei	siuntė	to send
skleisti	skleidžiu	skleidi	skleidžia	skleidžiau	skleidei	skleidė	to spread
skų́sti	skùndžiu	skundi	skundžia	skundžiau	skundei	skundė	to tell on; tattle; appeal (against)
When a pre-desinential syllable having mixed diphthong becomes open in the past, its vowel receives a start-firm accent and lengthens (for a, e, besides lengthening, those vowels are of different quality, o, ė) if stressed.
gérti	geriu	geri	geria	gė́riau	gėrei	gėrė	to drink
bérti	beriu	beri	beria	bė́riau	bėrei	bėrė	to (make it) pour (solid, no liquid matter), (make it) fall apart
pér̃ti	periu	peri	peria	pė́riaũ	pėrei	pėrė	to beat with a leafy, wet birch bunch (in sauna)
kélti	keliu	keli	kelia	kėliau	kėlei	kėlė	to raise
rem̃ti	remiu	remi	remia	rėmiau	rėmei	rėmė	to prop, bear up; support
kùlti	kuliu	kuli	kulia	kū́liau	kūlei	kūlė	to flail
dùrti	duriu	duri	duria	dūriau	dūrei	dūrė	to prick, stick
stùmti	stumiu	stumi	stumia	stūmiau	stūmei	stūmė	to push, move; thrust, shove; (coll.) grudge
i̇̀rti	iriu	iri	iria	ýriau	yrei	yrė	to row, oar
spi̇̀rti	spiriu	spiri	spiria	spyriau	spyrei	spyrė	to kick; spring back; press (for), push
kárti	kariù	kari	kãria	kóriau	korei	korė	to hang over; execute
árti	ariù	ari	ãria	ariaũ	arei̇̃	ãrė	to plough
tar̃ti	tariù	tari	tãria	tariaũ	tarei	tarė	to pronounce; assume
Alternation between u, e, a in the present and respectively ū, ė, o (long vowels, historically: ū, ē, ā) in the past. A vowel u is short both in stressed and unstressed position, e, a lengthen and are end-firm accented in stressed position in stem (not in desinence).
pū̃sti	pučiù	puti	pùčia	pūčiau	pūtei	pū̃tė	to blow; toot
tū̃pti	tupiu	tupi	tupia	tūpiau	tūpei	tūpė	to squat; hunker
drė̃bti	drebiu	drebi	drẽbia	drėbiau	drėbei	drė̃bė	to make fall on (for viscous, thick material); sleet; plonk
krė̃sti	krečiu	kreti	krečia	krėčiau	krėtei	krėtė	to shake down
plė̃sti	plečiu	pleti	plečia	plėčiau	plėtei	plėtė	to expand, widen, amplify
lė̃kti	lekiu	leki	lekia	lėkiau	lėkei	lėkė	to scurry, rip along, fly; fly; fall out, fly away
skė̃sti	skečiu	sketi	skečia	skėčiau	skėtei	skėtė	to spread, open out (e.g. arms, legs, umbrella)
tė̃kšti	teškiu	teški	teškia	tėškiau	tėškei	tėškė	to splash onto; slap; slam
võgti	vagiu	vagi	vãgia	vogiau	vogei	vogė	to steal

==== Suffixed ====
-o- suffixed stems. Shorter present tense. The consonant j is inserted between the vocalic stem and the desinence to make pronunciation easier. Historically it is most probably the same type as the full one, there are verbs that are conjugated in both types, for example, saugoti, saugau / saugoju (< saugā(j)u). The a-verb pažinoti – to know (a person), has the same to pažinti – to know, become familiar, -st- suffixed present forms.
žinóti	žinaũ	žinai	žino	žinójau	žinojai	žinojo	to know, be aware (of; that)
šypsótis	šỹpsaũsi	šypsaisi	šỹpsosi	šypsójausi	šypsojaisi	šypsojosi	to smile
sáugoti	sáugau	saugai	saugo	sáugojau	saugojai	saugojo	to protect; keep, save
Full type of -o- suffixed stems (the suffix is kept the same in conjugation)
naudóti	naudóju	naudoji	naudoja	naudójau	naudojai	naudojo	to use
putóti	putoju	putoji	putoja	putojau	putojai	putojo	to foam
býlóti	byloju	byloji	byloja	bylojau	bylojai	byloja	to speak, purport
sáugoti	sáugoju	saugoji	saugoja	saugojau	saugojai	saugojo	to protect; keep, save
šakótis	šakojuosi	šakojiesi	šakojasi	šakojausi	šakojaisi	šakojosi	to spread boughs: ramify; (coll.) conflict, put one's own condition over smb.; fork, divaricate
vilióti	vilioju	vilioji	vilioja	viliojau	viliojai	viliojo	to attract, seduce, bait
galióti			galioja			galiojo	to stand, hold good, be valid
Stems that do not have -o- suffix in the present tense.
miegóti	miegù	miegi	miẽga	miegójau	miegojai	miegojo	to sleep
raudóti	ráudu	raudi	ráuda	raudójau	raudojai	raudojo	to weep, mourn
giedóti	gi̇́edu	giedi	gieda	giedójau	giedojai	giedojo	to chant (religious); warble, crow
-y- suffixed stems. The present is of the -o- suffixed type. The past forms are historically possibly the same to the full -y- suffixed type, there are verbs that are conjugated in both types, for example, pelnyti, (past) pelniau / pelnijau, pelnė (< pelnē < (possibly) pelni(j)ā) / pelnijo (< pelnijā) (an after a soft consonant is e).
sakýti	sakaũ	sakai	sãko	sakiaũ	sakei	sãkė	to say
klausýti	klausau	klausai	klauso	klausiau	klausei	klausė	to listen
darýti	darau	darai	daro	dariau	darei	darė	to do
matýti	matau	matai	mato	mačiau	matei	matė	to see
mė́tyti	mė́tau	mėtai	mė́to	mė́čiau	mėtei	mė́tė	to throw (one-time: mesti, metu, mečiau)
ródyti	rodau	rodai	rodo	rodžiau	rodei	rodė	to show
pelnýti	pelnaũ	pelnai	pel̃no	pelniau	pelnei	pelnė	to earn
gáudyti	gaudau	gaudai	gaudo	gaudžiau	gaudei	gaudė	to catch (one-time: su/pagauti, -gaunu, -gavau)
barstýti	barstau	barstai	barsto	barsčiau	barstei	barstė	to pour (multiple times) (iterative)
lankstýti	lankstau	lankstai	lanksto	lanksčiau	lankstei	lankstė	to bend (multiple times) (iterative)
Full type of -y- suffixed stems. The suffix is shortened in conjugation if not stressed and is long or short (both variants are used) in the present if stressed.
pel̃nyti	pel̃niju	pelniji	pelnija	pelnijau	pelnijai	pelnijo	(obsolete) to earn
mū́ryti	mū́riju	mūriji	mūrija	mūrijau	mūrijai	mūrijo	to lay bricks, set
nuõdyti	nuõdiju	nuodiji	nuodija	nuodijau	nuodijai	nuodijo	to poison
trūnýti			trūnỹja			trūnijo	to rot, putrefy
-ė- suffixed stems. Shorter present tense, palatalized ending consonant of a stem. It is possible that historically it would be the same type as the full one, there are words that are conjugated in both types, for example, ryšė́ti – to wear something tied on oneself (rišti – to tie), ryšiù / ryšė́ju. For the a-verb vertėti the mainly used form is subjunctive, 3p. (present) vertė́tų – it would be worth, for the present tense it is mostly said in a neuter adjective: ver̃ta – it is worth (doing), for the past tense it is said either buvo verta or vertėjo – it was worth (doing).
mylė́ti	mýliu	mýli	mýli	mylė́jau	mylė́jai	mylė́jo	to love
norė́ti	nóriu	nori	nori	norėjau	norėjai	norėjo	to want
blyksė́ti	blýksiu	blyksi	blyksi	blyksėjau	blyksėjai	blyksėjo	to twinkle, blink
švytė́ti	švyčiù	švyti	švyti	švytė́jau	švytėjai	švytėjo	to shine, to glow, light brightly
galė́ti	galiù	gali̇̀	gãli	galė́jau	galėjai	galėjo	to be able
girdė́ti	girdžiù	girdi	girdi	girdėjau	girdėjai	girdėjo	to hear
rūpė́ti	rūpiù	rūpi	rūpi	rūpėjau	rūpėjai	rūpėjo	to concern, be interesting to smb.
nyrė́ti	nyriù	nyri	nyri	nyrėjau	nyrėjai	nyrėjo	to be submerged and still
tikė́ti	tikiù	tiki	tiki	tikėjau	tikėjai	tikėjo	to believe
vertė́ti			(verti)			vertėjo	to be worth for being done / to be done
Full type of -ė- suffixed stems (the suffix is kept the same in conjugation)
ryškė́ti	ryškė́ju	ryškėji	ryškėja	ryškė́jau	ryškėjai	ryškėjo	to grow clear, bold, bright, glowing
šviesė́ti	šviesė́ju	šviesėji	šviesėja	šviesė́jau	šviesėjai	šviesėjo	to grow light
tvirtė́ti	tvirtėju	tvirtėji	tvirtėji	tvirtėjau	tvirtėjai	tvirtėjo	to stiffen, strengthen, firm up
raudonė́ti	raudonėju	raudonėji	raudonėja	raudonėjau	raudonėjai	raudonėjo	to grow red, to redden
púoselėti	púoselėju	puoselėji	puoselėja	púoselėjau	puoselėjai	puoselėjo	to foster; cherish
The stems having the suffix -in-ė-, which is used to make iterative or progressive meaning, are of this type. Varaũ į darbą – I am driving / going to work (or "I am going to drive / go to work", if said before the action happens). Varinėju po miestą – I am driving / going in the town / city here and there. Varau per miestą – I am driving / going through a town / city. Atidarinėju tą dėžutę – I am opening / I am trying to open that can (at the moment) ("atidarau" is also possible as "I am opening"). Lengvai atidarau – I open it easily.
varinė́ti	varinė́ju	varinėji	varinėja	varinė́jau	varinėjai	varinėjo	to drive, direct; drive, go (on foot, by train, etc.); propel, power (not repeated: varyti, varau, variau)
pardavinėti	pardavinėju	pardavinėji	pardavinėja	pardavinėjau	pardavinėjai	pardavinėjo	to sell, market (one-time: parduoti, -duodu, -daviau)
klausinėti	klausinėju	klausinėji	klausinėja	klausinėjau	klausinėji	klausinėjo	to ask (not repeated: klausti, klausiu, klausiau)
Stems that have neither -ė- suffix nor palatalization in the present tense.
kalbė́ti	kalbù	kalbi	kal̃ba	kalbė́jau	kalbėjai	kalbėjo	to speak; talk
judė́ti	judu	judi	juda	judėjau	judėjai	judėjo	to move, be in motion
žibė́ti	žibu	žibi	žiba	žibėjau	žibėjai	žibėjo	to glitter, glint, star
bambė́ti		bámbi̇̀	bám̃ba		bambėjai	bambėjo	to grouse, be on smb's case
skambė́ti			skamba			skambėjo	to tune; sound
skaudė́ti			skauda			skaudėjo	to hurt, ache
byrė́ti			byra			byrėjo	to crumble; fall (small particles, petals)
-au-, -uo- suffixed stems, the suffix is -av- in the past. Verbs of this group are made from nouns, adjectives, etc. Verbs made from borrowings from other languages receive the suffix -uo-, for example, sportuoti – to go in for sports.
bendráuti	bendráuju	bendrauji	bendrauja	bendravaũ	bendravai	bendravo	to associate (with), communicate (with)
kariáuti	kariauju	kariauji	kariauja	kariavau	kariavai	kariavo	to be at war, wage war
matúoti	matúoju	matuoji	matuoja	matavaũ	matavai	matavo	to measure
dainúoti	dainuoju	dainuoji	dainuoja	dainavau	dainavai	dainavo	to sing
sapnúoti	sapnuoju	sapnuoji	sapnuoja	sapnavau	sapnavai	sapnavo	to dream (sleeping); (coll.) to speak about smth. lacking orientation in it
vėlúoti	vėluoju	vėluoji	vėluoja	vėlavau	vėlavai	vėlavo	to be late, to fall behind schedule
raudonúoti	raudonuoju	raudonuoji	raudonuoja	raudonavau	raudonavai	raudonavo	to blush; to attract attention by being red
sūpúoti	sūpuoju	sūpuoji	sūpuoja	sūpavau	sūpavai	sūpavo	to swing, sway, rock
kopijúoti	kopijuoju	kopijuoji	kopijuoja	kopijavau	kopijavai	kopijavo	to copy
Some other suffixes, for example, transitivity-forming suffix -in-. The suffix -en- can have a meaning of moderate intensity of action. The suffix -in- is usual for making verbs from foreign words, e.g., (coll.) kòpinti – to copy, which is used besides longer standard kopijuoti.
rū́pintis	rū́pinuosi	rūpiniesi	rūpinasi	rū́pinausi	rūpinasi	rūpinosi	to take care
grãžinti	grãžinu	gražini	gražina	grãžinau	gražinai	gražino	to beautify
grąži̇̀nti	grąžinù	grąžini	grąži̇̀na	grąžinaũ	gražinai	grąžino	to give back, return
jùdinti	jùdinu	judini	judina	jùdinau	judinai	judino	to move, make smth. move
lýginti	lýginu	lygini	lygina	lýginau	lyginai	lygino	to compare; to level, make level; make smooth; to iron (clothes); to equate
srovénti			srovẽna			srovẽno	to stream tranquilly, in small ripples
kuténti	kutenù	kuteni	kutẽna	kutenaũ	kutenai	kutẽno	to tickle, titillate
gabenti	gabenu	gabeni	gabena	gabenau	gabenai	gabeno	to convey, carry
kūrenti	kūrenu	kūreni	kūrena	kūrenau	kūrenai	kūreno	to fire a furnace, heater
ridenti	ridenu	rideni	ridena	ridenau	ridenai	rideno	to trundle, wheel, roll, make roll; bowl

== Syntax ==
=== Word order ===
Lithuanian has an SVO (subject–verb–object) as the main word order:

Adjunct(s)(temporal, locative, causal) + Subject + Adjunct(s)(other) + Verb + Object(s) + Infinitive + other parts.

At the same time Lithuanian as a highly declined language is often considered to have the free word order. This idea is partially true, and a sentence such as "Today I saw a beautiful girl at the movies" could be said or written in many ways:

Šiandien kine aš mačiau gražią mergaitę.
Today {at the movies} I saw beautiful girl

Aš mačiau gražią mergaitę kine šiandien.
Šiandien aš mačiau gražią mergaitę kine.
Gražią mergaitę mačiau aš kine šiandien.
Gražią mergaitę aš šiandien mačiau kine.
Kine šiandien aš mačiau gražią mergaitę.
Kine gražią mergaitę aš mačiau šiandien.

However, word order isn't a subject of intonation only. Different word orders often have different meanings in Lithuanian. There are also some strict rules and some tendencies in using different word placing. For example, a word that provides new information (rheme, or comment) has a tendency to be postponed after other words, but not always to the end of the sentence. Adjectives precede nouns like they do in English, but order of adjectives in an adjective group is different from English. If the main word order is followed, a temporal, locative or causal adjunct is put at the beginning of the sentence, while adjuncts of other types go directly before the verb and its objects (see the SVO rule above).

The word order in Lithuanian can also be described using concepts of theme and rheme. Looking from this point of view, the structure of a sentence is following:

Initial complementary words or clauses + theme + middle words or clauses + rheme + final complementary words or clauses

The middle words or clauses are more significant words or word groups other than the theme or the rheme, but complementary words or clauses (both the initial and the final) are less significant or secondary. Local, causal or temporal adjuncts are typical parts of the initial complementary words group, while other complementary words are put in the final group. If an adjunct is more significant in a sentence, it should be put in the middle group or even used as theme or as rheme. The same is true considering any other part of sentence, but the Subject and the Verb aren't complementary words typically, and they often serve as the theme and as the rheme respectively. Note that a sentence can lack any part of the structure, except the rheme.

=== Prepositions ===
Prepositions indicate the location or direction of an object. In Lithuanian, certain prepositions are used with certain cases, as can be seen by the lists below. (Prepositions marked with an asterisk govern different cases depending on meaning.)

==== Accusative prepositions ====
- apiẽ 'about'
- į̇̃ 'into, toward'
- pagal̃ 'according to, by'
- pàs 'to, at'
- per̃ 'across, by, over, through, during, via'
- *põ 'around, throughout; each'
- priẽš 'in front of, before'
- prõ 'through, past, by'
- *ùž 'for, because of, due to'

==== Genitive prepositions ====
- añt 'on'
- arti̇̀ 'near, close to'
- bè 'without'
- dė̃l 'for, because of, due to'
- iki̇̀ 'until, to, till'
- i̇̀š 'from, out of'
- li̇̀g, li̇̀gi 'until, to, till'
- nuõ 'away from'
- pasàk 'according to'
- *põ 'after, past, succeeding'
- priẽ 'near, at'
- šalià 'by, next to, alongside'
- tar̃p 'between, among'
- *ùž 'behind'
- vir̃š 'over, above'

==== Instrumental prepositions ====
- *põ 'under, beneath'
- sù 'with'
- tiẽs 'by, over'

=== Conjunctions ===
Conjunctions are used to link together clauses in a sentence, for example "I thought it would be a nice day but it was raining." Some common conjunctions in Lithuanian are:

- ar̃ – used to start a yes-no question, but can also mean "or"
- arbà – or/but
- bèt – but
- ir̃ – and
- jéi – if
- kàd – that (not the demonstrative pronoun)
- kõl – until/till
- nès – because
- tačiaũ – however

== See also ==
- Lithuanian phonology
- Lithuanian orthography

== Bibliography ==
- Dambriūnas, Leonardas, 1906–1976. (1999) [1966]. "2.3". Beginner's Lithuanian. Klimas, Antanas, 1924–, Schmalstieg, William R. New York, N.Y.: Hippocrene Books. p. 27. ISBN 0-7818-0678-X. OCLC 40553239.
- Lithuanian Grammar, edited by Vytautas Ambrazas. Institute of the Lithuanian Language, 1997.
