= List of Armenian ethnic enclaves =

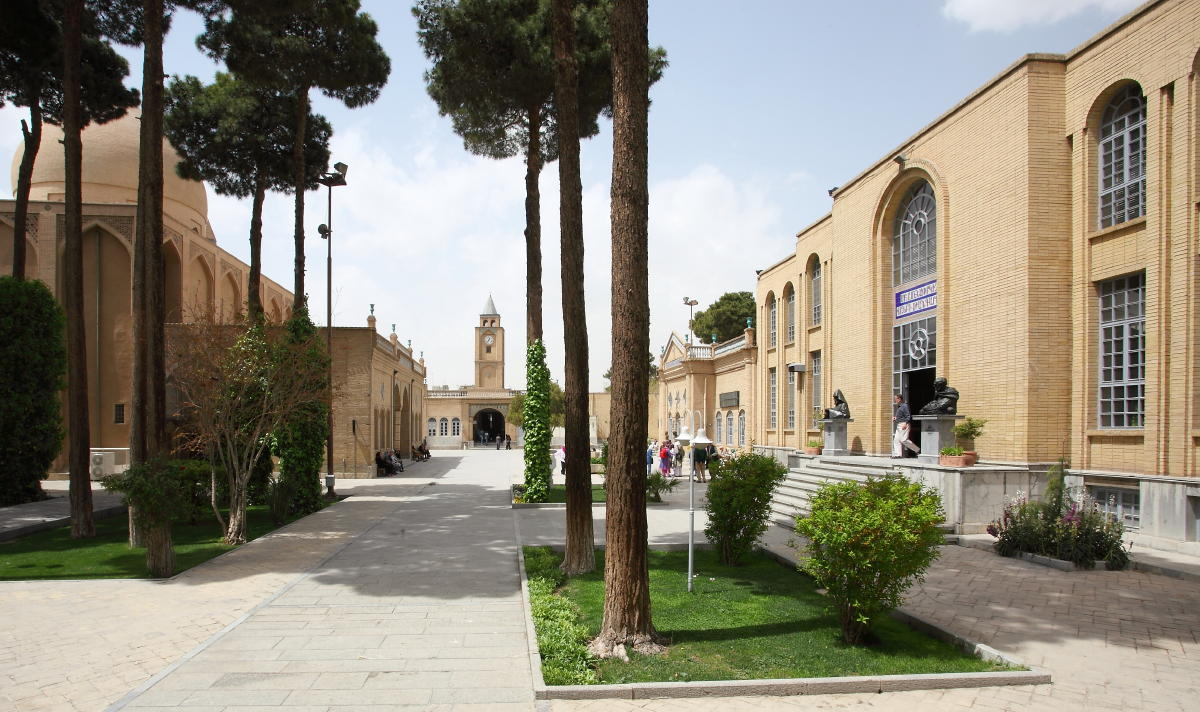
New Julfa in Isfahan, Iran: it is still one of the oldest and largest Armenian quarters in the world.

This is a list of Armenian ethnic enclaves, containing cities, districts, and neighborhoods with predominantly Armenian population, or are associated with Armenian culture, either currently or historically. (Note: This article only lists ethnic enclaves in the Armenian diaspora. Many sources describe Nagorno-Karabakh as having been an Armenian ethnic enclave, which it was during most of its existence as the Nagorno-Karabakh Autonomous Oblast (1923–1991), when it did not border Soviet Armenia. Before its dissolution in 2023 following a successful Azerbaijani offensive, the Nagorno-Karabakh Republic (NKR) was largely integrated with Armenia and the two de facto functioned as a single entity. However, the NKR's independence was never internationally recognized and it was regarded by all UN members as de jure part of Azerbaijan.) Most numbers are estimates by various organizations and media, because many countries simply do not collect data on ethnicity.

== Extant enclaves ==
=== Europe ===
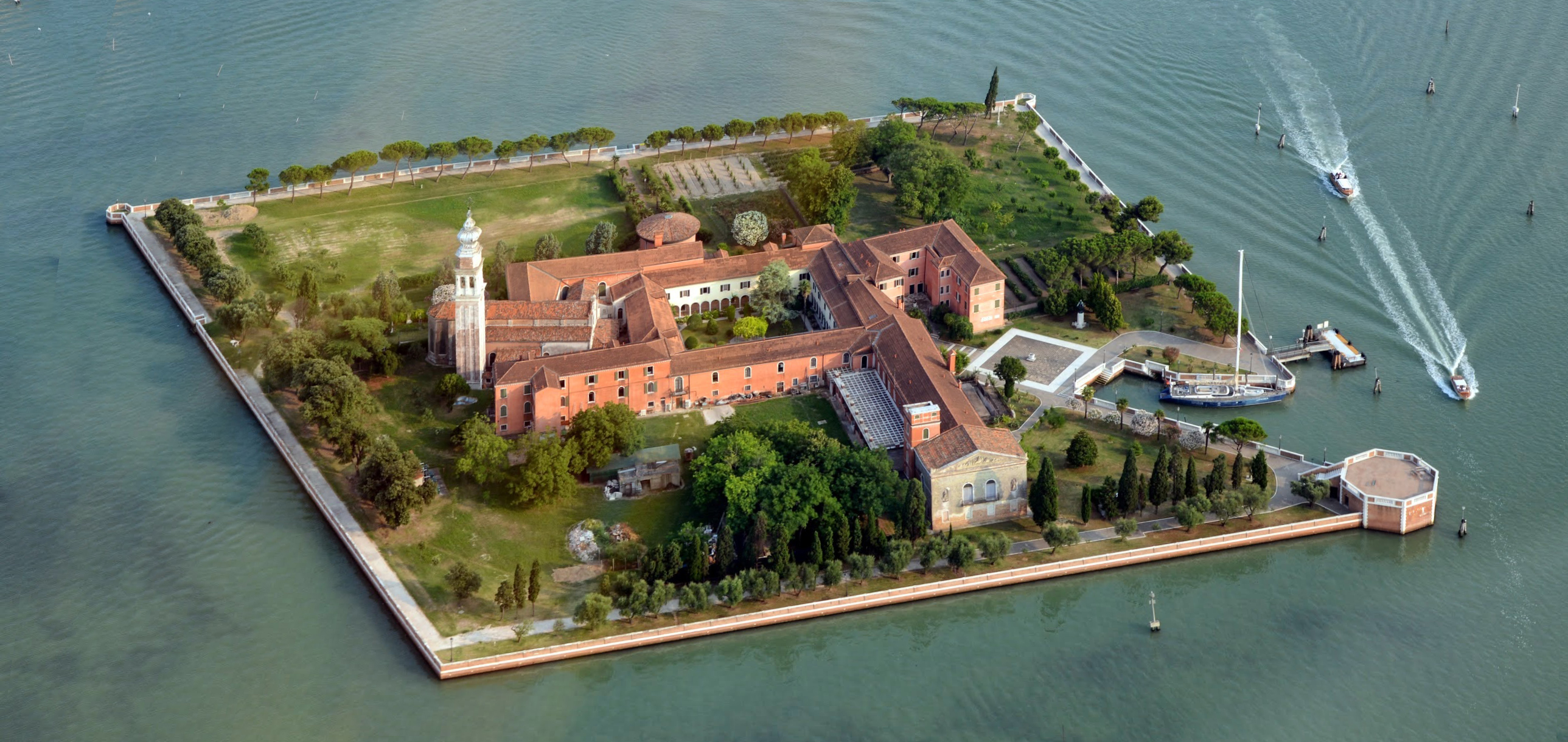
San Lazzaro degli Armeni, located in the Venetian Lagoon, is home to an Armenian Catholic monastery.

Name	Type	Location	Total	Armenians	%	Ref
Alfortville	commune	Paris, France	45,000	7,000–9,000	15–20%	
Issy-les-Moulineaux	commune	Paris, France	63,000	6,000–6,500	10%	
San Lazzaro degli Armeni	island	Venice, Italy	17		~100%	
Valence	commune	Drôme, France	64,483	7,500	10%	
Marseille	prefecture	Bouches-du-Rhône, France	873,076	80,000	9%	

=== Middle East ===
Syria

There are several Armenian-populated villages in Syria: including Aramo, Al-Ghanimeh (Ghnemieh), Kessab (Note: The Armenian population of Kessab was forced out in March 2014, during the Syrian Civil War.) (2,000–2,200) in Latakia; and Yakubiyah in Idlib. Aleppo has the Armenian neighborhoods of Al-Jdayde and Nor Kyough (Midan).

Jordan

Armenians also resettled in al-Ashrafiya, Jordan from 1914, where they constructed an Armenian Apostolic Church and a school in 1962.

other countries

Name	Type	Location	Total	Armenians	%	Ref
Anjar	town	Zahlé, Lebanon	2,400–6000		~100%	
Antelias	city	Metn, Lebanon	16,000	3,200–4,000	~20%	
Armenian Quarter	quarter	Old City, Jerusalem (Note: The status of Jerusalem is disputed between Israel and the State of Palestine, but the Old City is de facto administered by Israel.)	2,424	500–1,000	21–41%	
Beirut	city	Beirut, Lebanon	430,000	51,600	~12%	
Bourj Hammoud	city	Metn, Lebanon	150,000	110,000	73%	
Bzoummar	village	Keserwan District, Lebanon	700	300	42%	
Mezher	village	Beirut, Lebanon	1,000		~100%	
New Julfa	quarter	Isfahan, Iran	10,000–12,000		—N/a	
Zarneh (Boloran)	village	Isfahan Province, Iran	61	61	100%	
Vakıflı	village	Hatay, Turkey	135		~100%	

=== Post-Soviet states ===
==== Georgia ====
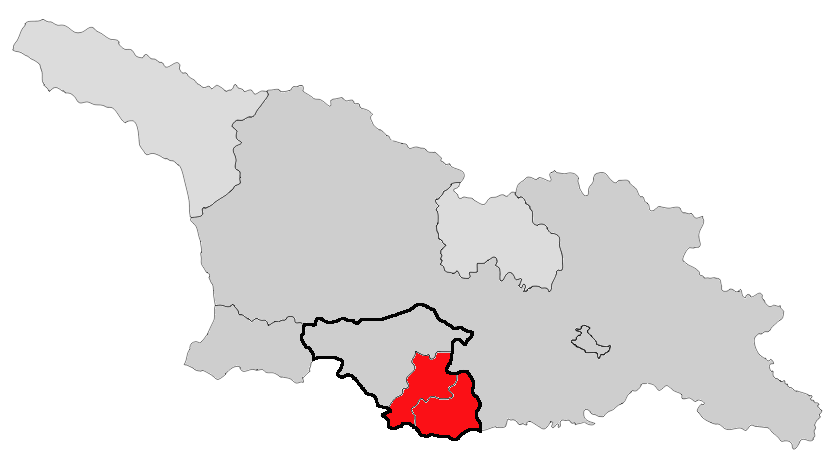
Javakheti (Javakhk) shown in red on the map of Georgia with Samtskhe-Javakheti provincial borders outlined.

Name	Type	Location	Total	Armenians	%	Ref
Avlabari (Havlabar)	neighborhood	Tbilisi				
Javakheti (Javakhk)	province	Samtskhe-Javakheti	95,280	90,373	94.8%	

==== Abkhazia ====
As of 2004, there were "around 50–60 Armenian villages" in Abkhazia. According to the 2011 Abkhazian census, Armenians formed the majority of the population of the Sukhumi District (6,467 Armenians, 56.1% of the total 11,531), and plurality in Gulripshi District (8,430 Armenians or 46.8% of 18,032) and Gagra District (15,422 Armenians or 38.3% of 40,217).

==== Russia ====
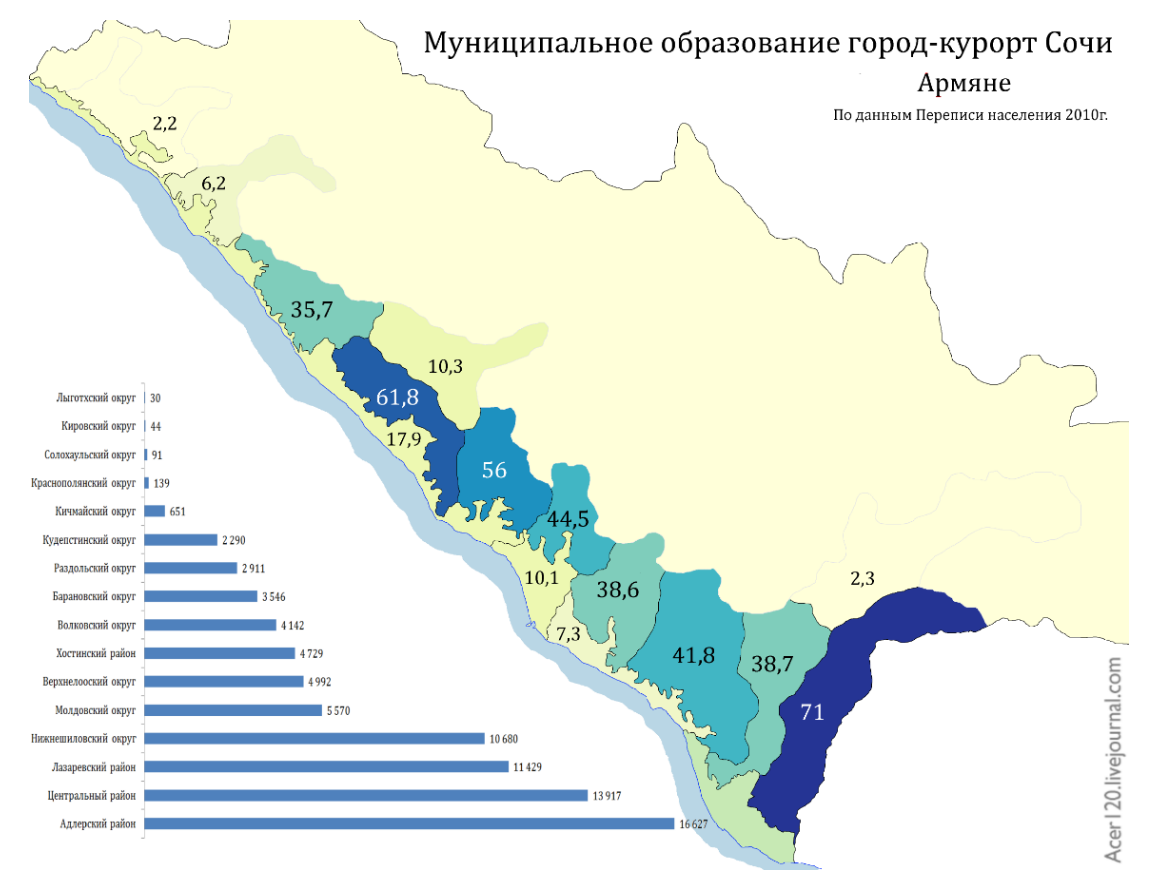
The proportion of Armenians in the municipality of Sochi, Russia by settlements

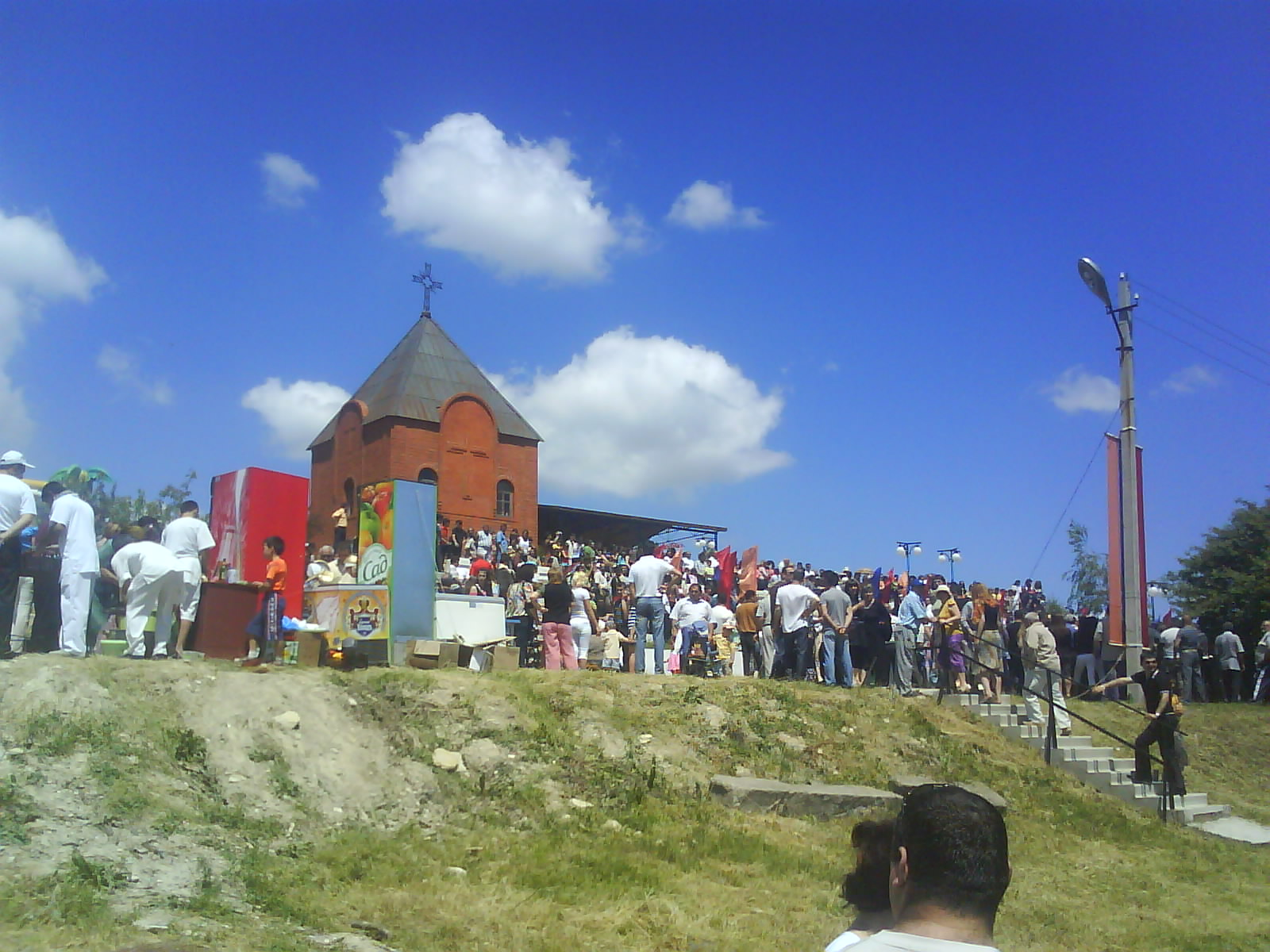
Khachkar holiday in Gaikodzor

Name	Type	Location	Total	Armenians	%	Ref
Adlersky City District	raion	Sochi, Krasnodar Krai	138,572	44,000–80,000	32%–58%	
Edissiya	village	Stavropol Krai	5,657	5,377	92.7%	
Gaikodzor	village	Anapsky District, Krasnodar Krai				
Karabagly	village	Dagestan	723	~400	56%	
Myasnikovsky District	raion	Rostov Oblast	39,631	22,108	56%	
Proletarsky raion (former Nakhichevan-on-Don)	city raion	Rostov-on-Don, Rostov Oblast	122,174	10,008	8%	
Tuapsinsky District	raion	Krasnodar Krai	62,400	13,700	22%	
Malye Vnegoschi	village	Kaluga Oblast	11	11	100%	
Krutaya	village	Kaluga Oblast	10	10	100%	
Zhilnevo	village	Kaluga Oblast	36	34	94.4%	
Sverdlovo	village	Kaluga Oblast	18	15	83.3%	
Mayak	village	Kaluga Oblast	19	13	68.4%	
Kalizna	village	Kaluga Oblast	20	13	65.0%	
Novosyolki	village	Kaliningrad Oblast	21	13	61.9%	
Zubakino	village	Leningrad Oblast	25	12	48%	
Yeruslanovka	village	Stavropol Krai	254	117	46.1%	
Prigorodnoye	village	Kaliningrad Oblast	114	51	44.7%	
Plavni	village	Kaliningrad Oblast	95	40	42.1%	
Pridorozhnoye	village	Kaliningrad Oblast	103	41	39.8%	
Otradnoye	village	Kaliningrad Oblast	115	43	37.4%	
Chubarovo	village	Kaluga Oblast	236	86	36.4%	
Dolina	village	Stavropol Krai	456	164	36.0%	
Kamyshovyi	village	Stavropol Krai	165	59	35.8%	
Mitinka	village	Kaluga Oblast	53	18	34.0%	
Belkino	village	Kaliningrad Oblast	70	23	32.9%	
Etoka	village	Stavropol Krai	2485	759	30.5%	
Reznikovo	village	Kaliningrad Oblast	53	16	30.2%	
Podlipovo	village	Kaliningrad Oblast	207	62	30.0%	
Lysogorskaya	village	Stavropol Krai	11220	3250	29.0%	
Orbelyanovka	village	Stavropol Krai	1436	413	28.8%	
Bely Yar	village	Kaliningrad Oblast	136	36	26.5%	
Panino	village	Kaluga Oblast	227	58	25.6%	
Kosarevo	village	Kaluga Oblast	68	17	25.0%	
Dunaevka	village	Stavropol Krai	727	176	24.2%	
Staromaryevka	village	Stavropol Krai	6889	1646	23.9%	
Nagorny	khutor	Stavropol Krai	295	69	23.4%	
Zavetnoye	village	Stavropol Krai	3751	871	23.2%	
Nezlobnaya	village	Stavropol Krai	19068	4129	21.7%	
Nizhnepodkumsky	village	Stavropol Krai	2289	494	21.6%	
Prigorodnoye	village	Kaliningrad Oblast	303	60	19.8%	
Medovoye	village	Kaliningrad Oblast	581	98	16.9%	
Prokhladnoye	village	Kaliningrad Oblast	370	62	16.8%	

==== Ukraine ====
Name	Type	Location	Total	Armenians	%	Ref
Aykavan	village	Crimea (Note: The Crimean Peninsula is disputed between Russia and Ukraine and is de facto part of Russia, but remains (for the most part) internationally recognized as de jure part of Ukraine. For more, see Political status of Crimea.)	160		~100%	

=== United States ===
Name	Type	Location	Total	Armenians	%	Ref
Glendale	city	Los Angeles County, California	220,000	100,000	45%	
Little Armenia	neighborhood	Los Angeles, California	21,600	—N/a		
Watertown	city	Boston, Massachusetts	33,000	2,700–8,000	8%–25%	

== Extinct enclaves ==
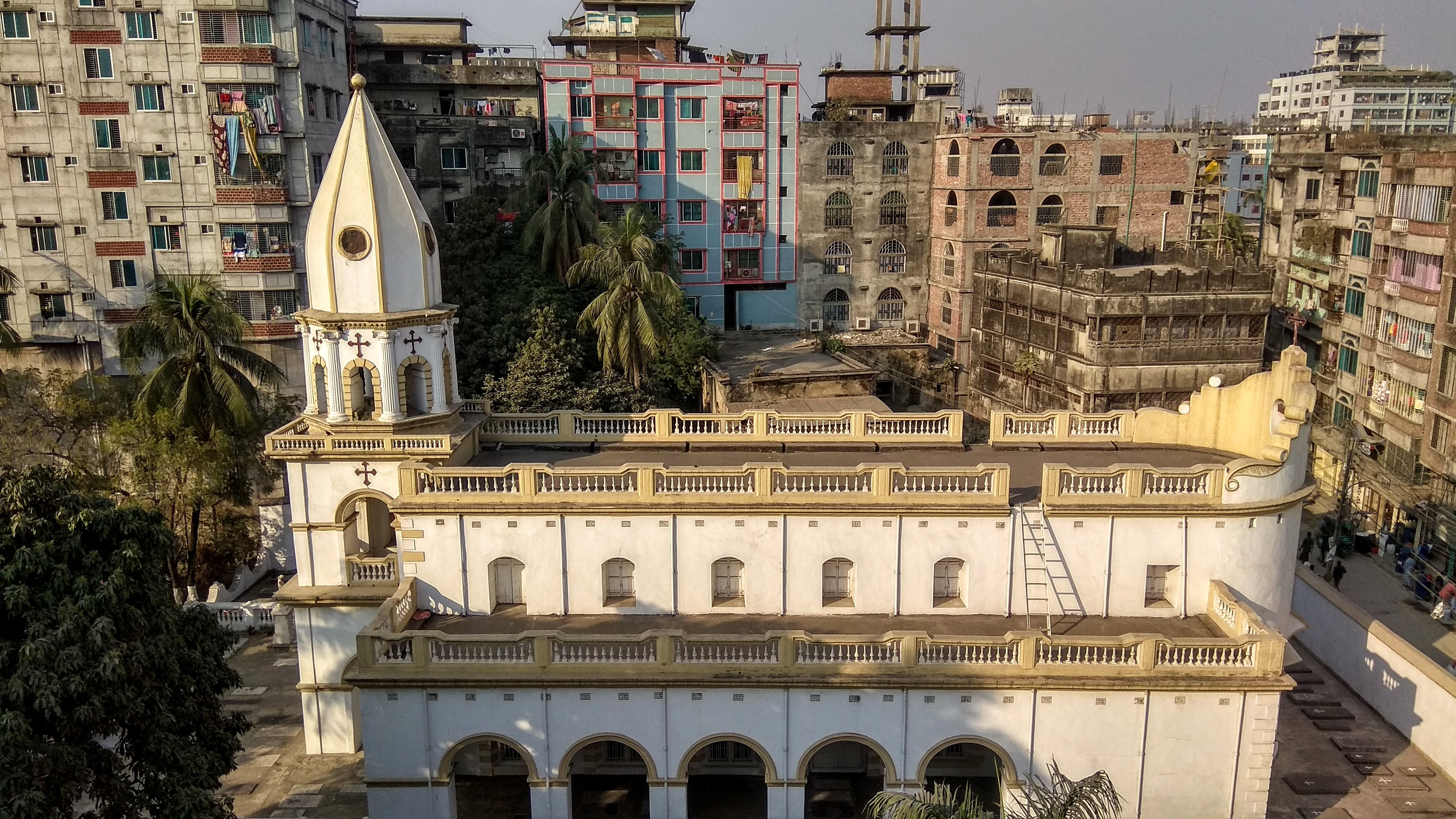
Armenian Church in Armanitola, Dhaka

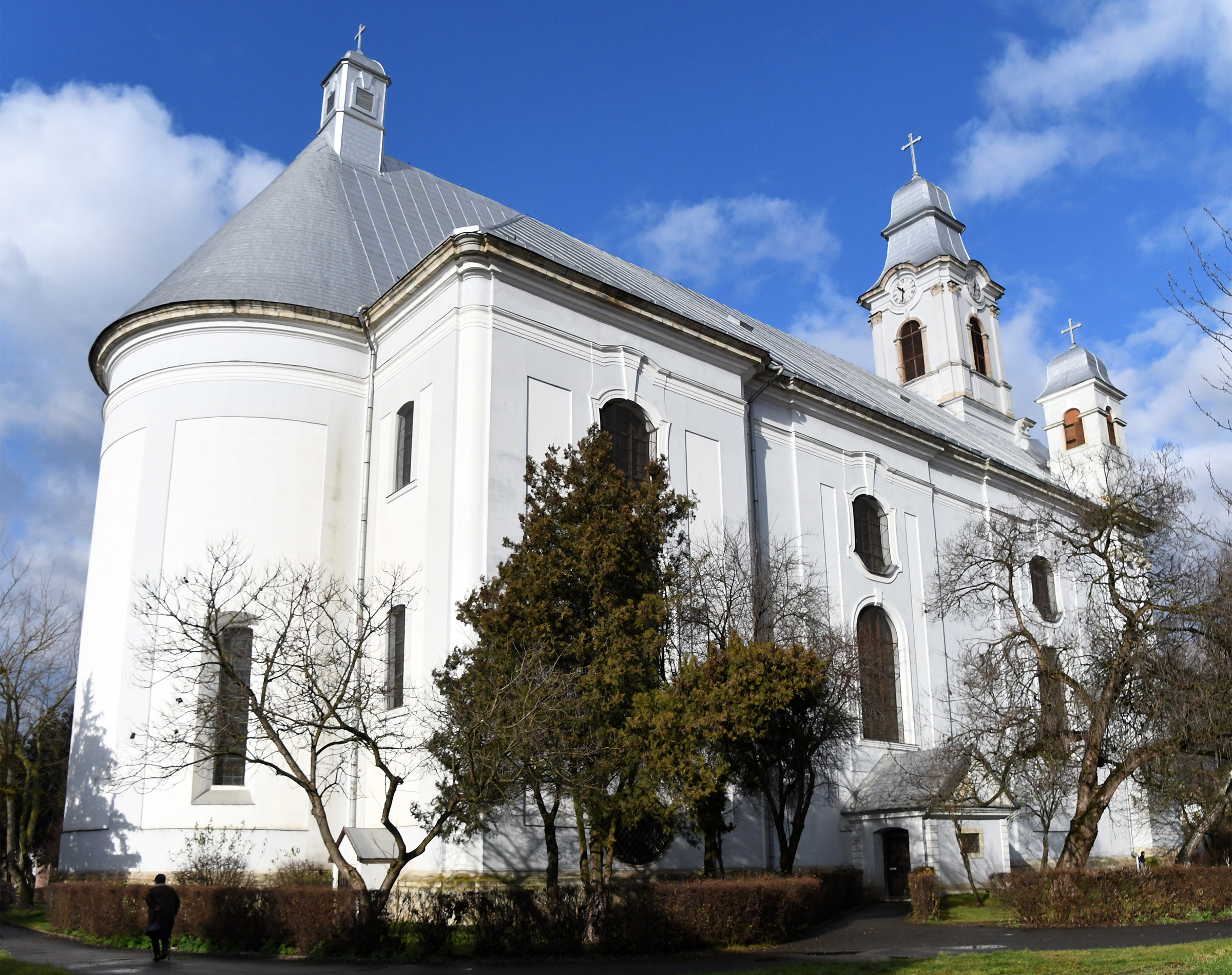
Holy Trinity Cathedral in Gherla

Name	Type	Current location	Period	Armenian population & %(date)	Ref
Armanitola	neighborhood	Dhaka, Bangladesh	18th century		
Armen Sefer	neighborhood	Addis Ababa, Ethiopia	early 20th century		
Ghala and Lilava (Armanestān)	neighborhood	Tabriz, Iran	19th century	6,000 (c. 1900)	
Ermenikend	quarter	Nasimi raion, Baku, Azerbaijan	19th–20th centuries		
Nərimanov raion	city district	Baku, Azerbaijan	mid-20th century	27.6–47.6% (1939–79)	
Dumbrăveni (Elisabetopolis)	town	Sibiu County, Romania	17th century	30.98% (1850)	
Frumoasa	commune	Harghita County, Romania	17th century	14.25% (1850)	
Gheorgheni	city	Harghita County, Romania	17th century	21.33% (1850)	
Gherla (Armenopolis)	city	Cluj County, Romania	17th century	43.48% (1850)	
Suceava	city	Suceava County, Romania	14th–20th centuries	8.33% (1900)	
Kınalıada	island	Istanbul, Turkey	19th–20th centuries	35,000 (seasonal); 65–95%	
Kizlyar	town	Dagestan, Russia	late 19th century	3,523 (48%) (1897)	
Kumkapı	quarter	Fatih, Istanbul, Turkey			
Nakhichevan-on-Don	city	Rostov-on-Don, Russia	1778–1928	30–58.7% (1897)	
Old Armenian Town	neighborhood	Fresno, California, United States	c. 1900—1950s		
Yettem	settlement	Tulare County, California, United States	c. 1900—1920s	500 (100%) (1920)	

=== Central Asia ===
Name	Type	Current location	Period	Armenian population & %(date)	Ref
Ashgabat	town	Turkmenistan	late 19th to early 20th century	13.53% (1926)	
Türkmenbashy	town	Turkmenistan	late 19th to early 20th century	12.99% (1897)	
Merv	town	Turkmenistan	late 19th to early 20th century	8.00% (1897)	
Gyzylarbat	town	Turkmenistan	late 19th to early 20th century	10.00% (1897)	

=== Ukraine and Moldova (formerly Poland and Crimea) ===
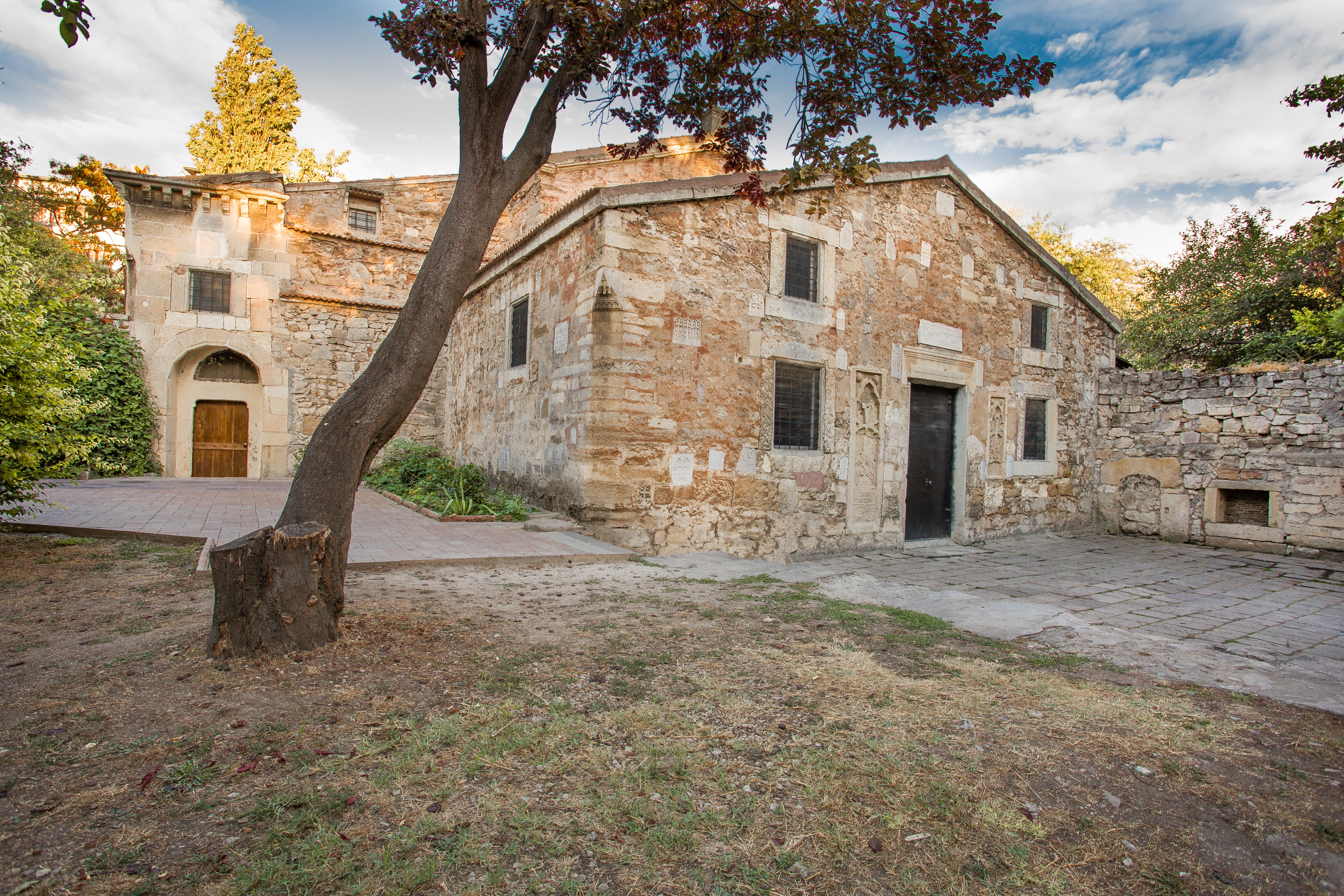
Surb Sarkis church in Feodosia

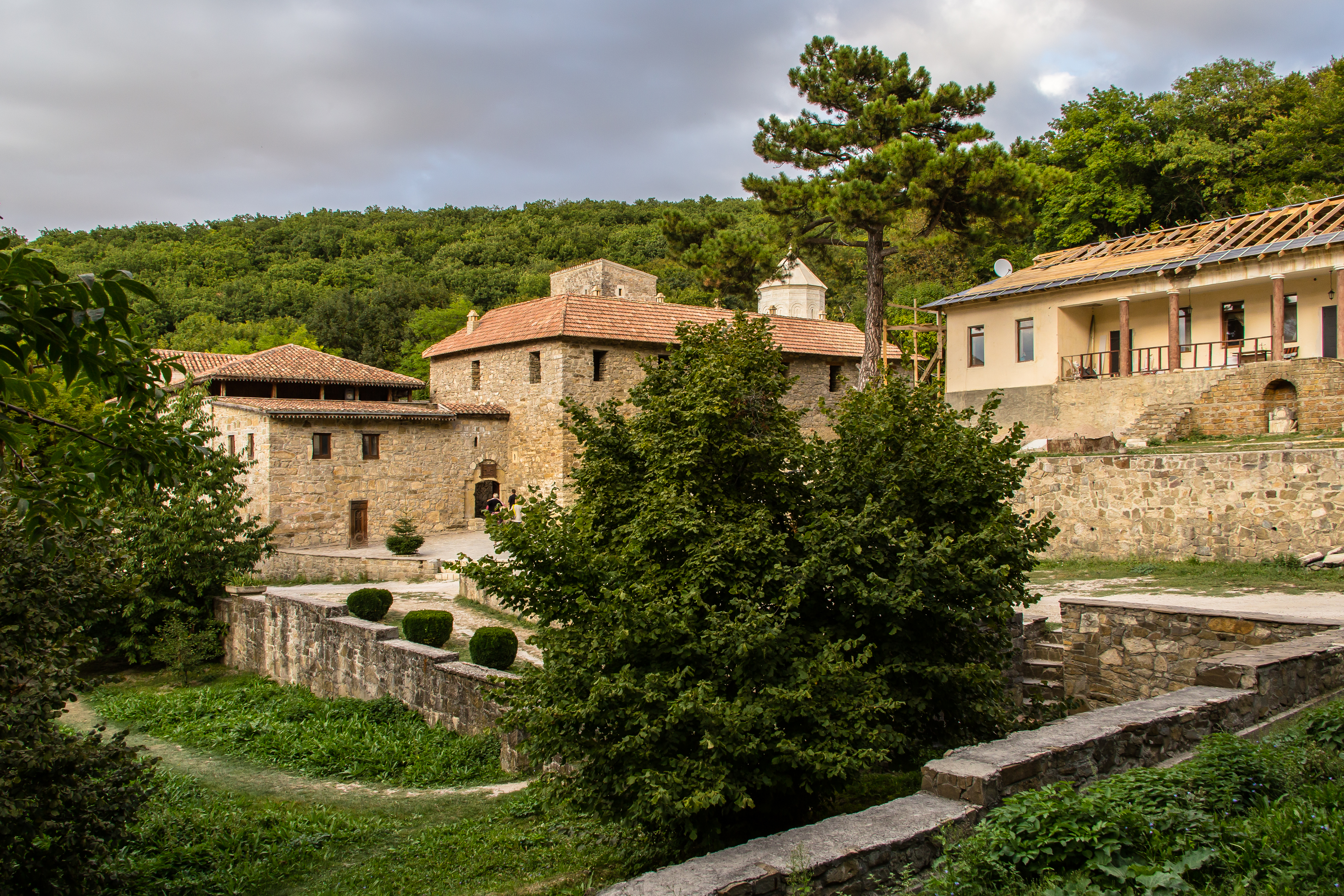
Surp Khach Monastery in Staryi Krym

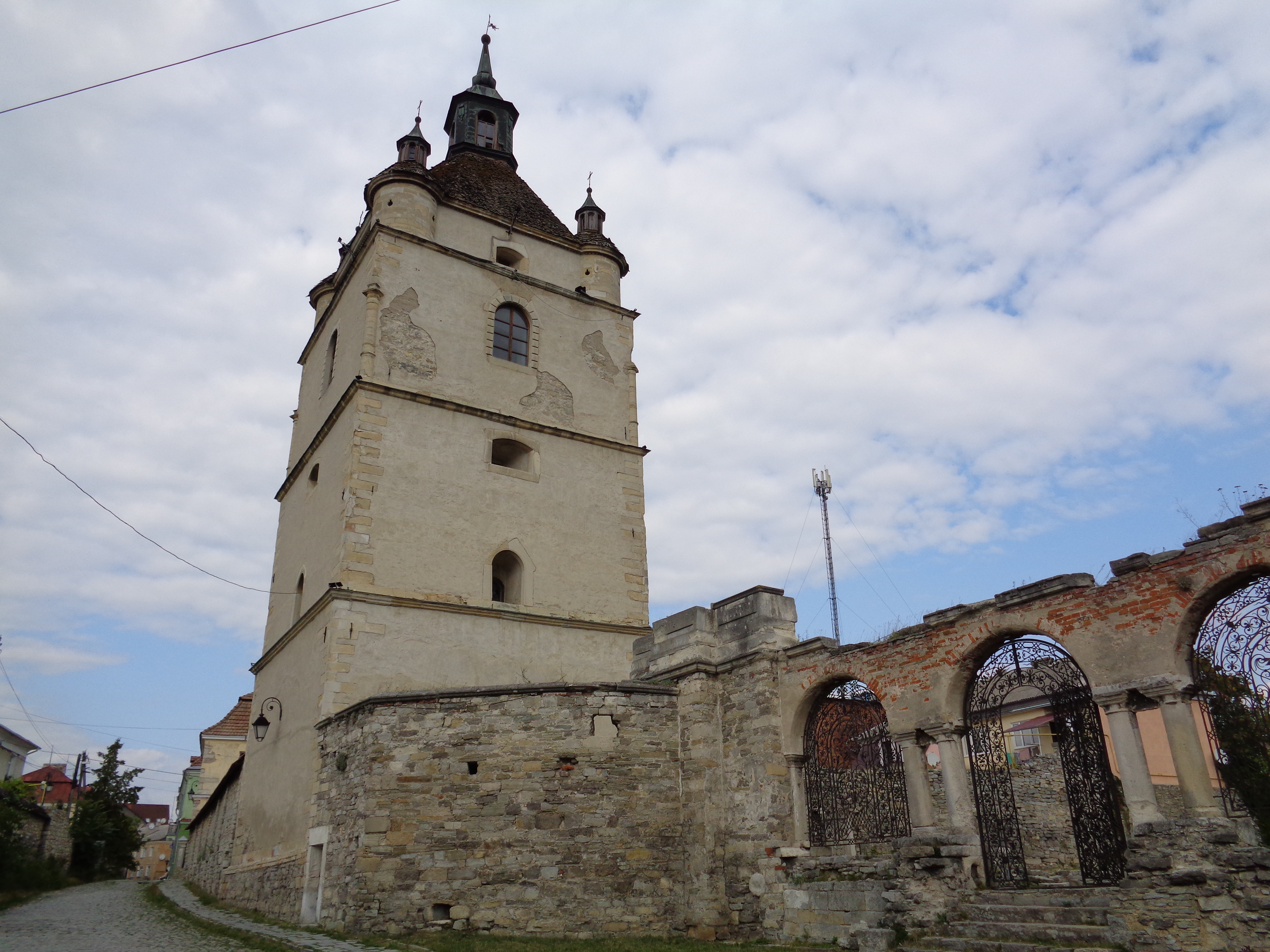
Bell tower of Armenian Saint Nicholas church in Kamianets-Podilskyi

Name	Type	Current location	Period	Armenian population & %(date)	Ref
Feodosia (Kaffa)	city	Crimea	15th century	46,000 (65%) (1470s)	
Staryi Krym	town	Crimea		471 (43.4%) (1863)	
Lwów (Note: The city was home to one of Armenian communes in the Kingdom of Poland. For more information see: Armenians in Poland)	city	Lviv Oblast, Ukraine	14th–18th centuries	2,500 (minority) (1633)	
Kamieniec Podolski	city	Khmelnytskyi Oblast, Ukraine	14th–18th centuries	Minority	
Jazłowiec	town	Ternopil Oblast, Ukraine	16th–18th centuries	Minority	
Śniatyn	town	Ivano-Frankivsk Oblast, Ukraine	17th–18th centuries	Minority	
Brody	town	Lviv Oblast, Ukraine	17th–18th centuries	Minority	
Stanisławów	town	Ivano-Frankivsk Oblast, Ukraine	17th–18th centuries	Minority	
Żwaniec	town	Khmelnytskyi Oblast, Ukraine	17th–18th centuries	Minority	
Łysiec	town	Ivano-Frankivsk Oblast, Ukraine	17th–18th centuries	Minority	
Horodenka	town	Ivano-Frankivsk Oblast, Ukraine	17th–18th centuries	Minority	
Brzeżany	town	Ternopil Oblast, Ukraine	17th–18th centuries	Minority	
Tyśmienica	town	Ivano-Frankivsk Oblast, Ukraine	17th–18th centuries	Minority	
Obertyn	town	Ivano-Frankivsk Oblast, Ukraine	18th century	Minority	
Mohylów Podolski	town	Vinnytsia Oblast, Ukraine	18th century	Minority	
Józefgród	town	Odesa Oblast, Ukraine	18th century	Minority	
Raszków	town	Transnistria, Moldova	18th century	Minority	

=== Georgia and the adjacent Governorates of the Russian Empire ===
Name	Type	Region	Period	Armenian population & %(date)	Ref
Sighnaghi	town	(Georgia (country)) Kakheti	19th century	96% (c. 1836)	
Telavi	town	(Georgia (country)) Kakheti	19th century	81% (c. 1836)	
Gori	town	(Georgia (country)) Shida Kartli	19th century	58.25% (c. 1873)	
Sololaki	neighborhood	(Georgia (country)) Tbilisi	19th century	Minority	
Batumi	town	(Georgia (country)) Adjara	Late 19th century	24% (c. 1897)	
Oni	town	(Georgia (country)) Racha	Late 19th century	13.78% (c. 1897)	
Artvin	town	(Turkey) Artvin province	Late 19th century	65.52% (c. 1897)	
Dusheti	town	(Georgia (country)) Mtskheta-Mtianeti	19th century	Majority	
Zaqatala	town	(Azerbaijan) Zaqatala	Late 19th century	46.5% (c. 1897)	

== See also ==
- Armenian diaspora
- Ethnic enclave

== Bibliography ==
- Stopka, Krzysztof (2010). "Ormianie". In Kopczyński, Michał; Tygielski, Wojciech (eds.). Pod wspólnym niebem. Narody dawnej Rzeczypospolitej (in Polish). Warszawa: Muzeum Historii Polski, Bellona. ISBN 978-83-11-11724-2.
