= Gogle =

Gogle may be a typo of:

- Google, a company
- Goggle, a kind of eyewear
- Googe, a surname
- Gogol (disambiguation)
- Googol, a number
