= Googly (disambiguation) =

A googly in cricket is a deceptive delivery bowled by a right-arm leg spin bowler.

Googly may also refer to:

- Googly (2013 film), an Indian Kannada-language romantic comedy film
  - Googly 2, its sequel
- Googly (2019 film), an Indian Bengali-language romantic comedy film
- Googly eyed doll or Googly, a type of early 20th century doll

== See also ==
- Googly eyes, small plastic craft supplies used to imitate eyeballs
- Google (disambiguation)
- Googol, the large number 10^{100}
