= Cherkesogai =

Ethnic Armenians in Krasnodar Krai and Adygea in Russia

- A proposed flag of the Cherkesogai, used unofficially

Total population
- 100,000 - 350,000

Regions with significant populations
- Armavir (Krasnodar Krai), Maykop (Adygea)

Languages
- Armenian, Adyghe, Kabardian, Russian

Religion
- Predominantly: Christianity (Armenian Apostolic Church)

Related ethnic groups
- other Armenians, Armenians in Russia

Cherkesogai (Russian: Черкесогаи), or Circassian Armenians (Armenian: չերքեզահայեր cherk'ezahayer; Circassian: Адыгэ-ермэлы, Adyge-ermely; Russian: черкесские армяне, romanized: cherkesskiye armyane); sometimes referred to as Ermeli (Circassian: Ермэлы), Mountainous Armenians (Russian: горские армяне, romanized: gorskiye armyane) or Transkuban Armenians (закубанские армяне, zakubanskiye armyane), are ethnic Armenians who have inhabited Circassia since the end of the 15th century and spoke the Adyghe language (currently, most of them speak Russian as their first language), in contrast to other Armenians living in the region. They reside mostly in the cities of Armavir and Maykop. The total number of Cherkesogai is about 50,000 people (2008 estimate). According to the Russian 2002 Census, 230 Armenians speak Lowland Adyghe and 222 speak Kabardian Adyghe natively.

Notable Cherkesogai include the first Soviet millionaire Artyom Mikhailovich Tarasov, Prix Goncourt-winning writer Henri Troyat (né Lev Aslanovich Tarasov), merchant Nikita Pavlovich Bogarsukov and ballerina Olga Aslanovna Tarasova.

== History ==
Since the early medieval period, many Armenians have lived as diaspora, due to foreign invasions of Armenia, national and religious persecution, genocide and wars. Most of the present-day Armenian diaspora in the North Caucasus arrived in the 17th and 18th centuries, though the first Hemshin Armenians arrived in the 8th century.

The migrations of Armenians to the Kuban took place in a series of waves. The first took place from the late 1780s to the 1860s, when around 3,000 Armenians came from the Russian towns of Astrakhan, Kizlyar and Mozdok, as well as around 300 Persian Armenians. During this period, the first Armenian settlements in the Kuban were founded, including Armavir, founded in 1839, considered to be the first. Armenians also established communities in larger towns such as Novorossiysk, Anapa and Ekaterinodar.

A second wave of migrants came during the end of the 19th and the beginning of the 20th centuries, when around 30,000 mostly Turkish Hemshin Armenians arrived in the region, along with a few from Persia and Transcaucasia. Some came for economic reasons and were attracted by Russian government, while others were forced to leave due to oppression and genocide by the Ottoman government. Migration peaked from the late 1870s to the late 1910s, coinciding with the Russo-Turkish War of 1877–1878, pogroms against Armenians in Turkey and Baku and the 1915–1920 mass persecution of the Armenian population in Turkey.

A third wave of migration took place during the 1950s and comprised less than 300 ethnic Armenians of Georgia (Akhalkalaki Armenians) who mostly settled in Anapsky District, mainly in Gaikodzor.

The fourth wave took place in the 1970s and consisted mainly of ethnic Armenians of Azerbaijan (Karabakh Armenians) and Central Asia, such as the Uzbek, Kazakh and Kirghiz SSRs. They primarily came to Krasnodar Krai for economic reasons and numbered from 5,000 to 7,000 people.

From the end of the 1980s to the mid-1990s, around 300,000 more migrants arrived in the Kuban region as a result of the ethnic conflicts across the former Soviet Union, such as those in Azerbaijan and Armenia. Some later came as a result of poor economic conditions in the newly formed republics, from Armenia, Georgia and Central Asia.

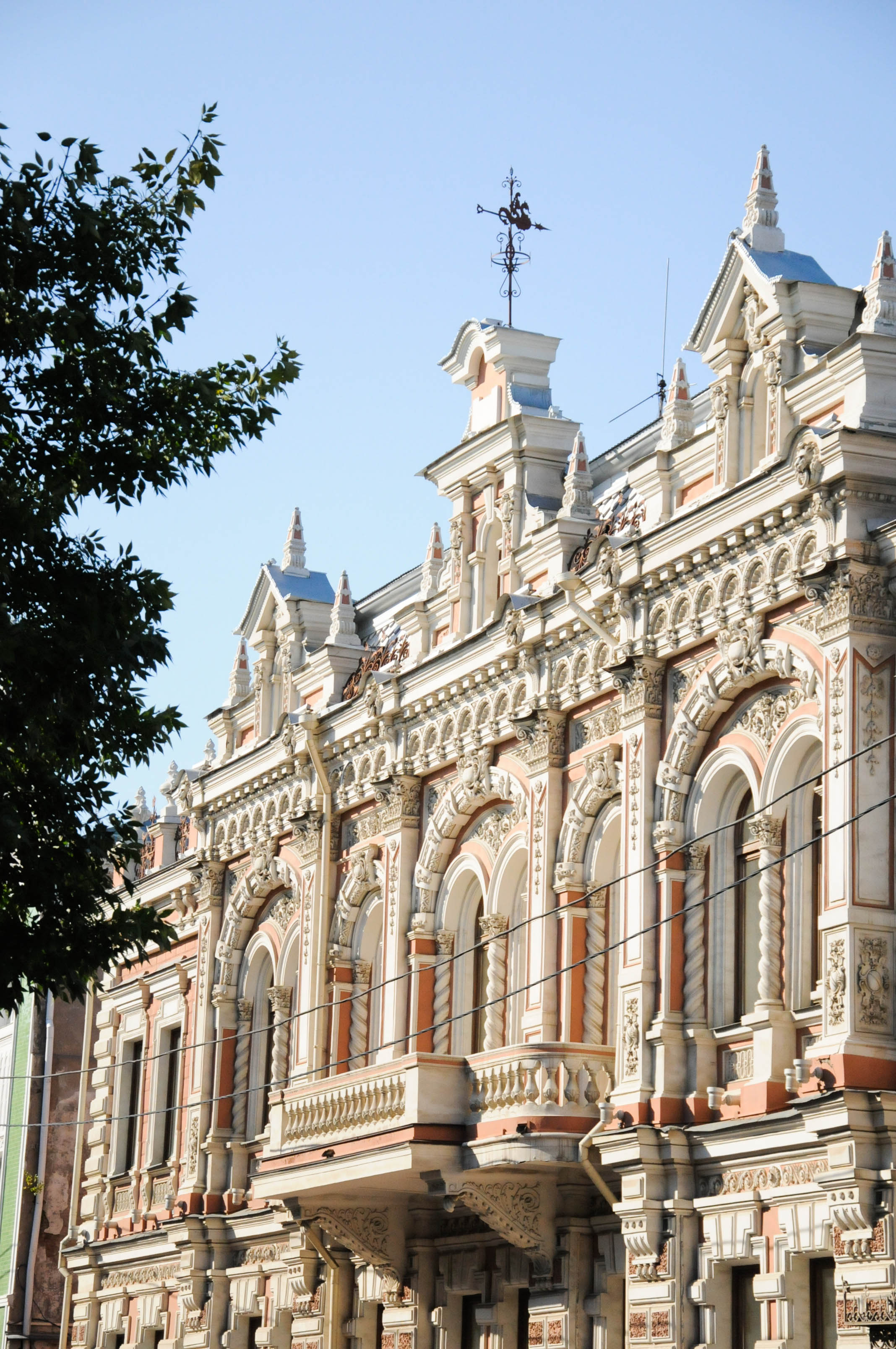
House of the Cherkesogai Bogarsukov Brothers in Krasnodar

== Notable Cherkesogai ==
- Artyom Mikhailovich Tarasov (born 1950), the first Soviet millionaire
- Henri Troyat (né Lev Aslanovich Tarasov; 1911–2007), Prix Goncourt-winning writer and historian, member of the Académie Française
- Nikita Pavlovich Bogarsukov (1834–1913), philanthropist, merchant and diplomat
- Olga Aslanovna Tarasova (1902–1982), ballerina

== See also ==
- Armenians in Russia
- Armenians in Ukraine
