= Prikumskoe =

Russian village

Prikumskoe Прикумское
- Interactive map of Prikumskoe
- Location of Prikumskoe Prikumskoe (European Russia) Prikumskoe (Europe)
- Coordinates: 44°14′13″N 42°54′07″E
- Country: Russia
- Federal subject: Stavropol Krai
- Founded: 1868

Population
  - Estimate (2021): 1,534 )
- Time zone: UTC+3 (MSK)
- Postal code: 357223
- OKTMO ID: 07721000296

Prikumskoe (Russian: Прикумское) is a rural locality (a selo) in Stavropol Krai, in southern Russia.

== Location ==
Prikumskoe is located in the North Caucasus, around 15 km west of Mineralnye Vody, and around 20 km northwest of the health resort city Pyatigorsk. The village lies on the left bank of Kuma River at 400 m above the sea level, to the north of the so-called Camel Mountain with two distinctive humps.

== History ==
The village was founded in 1868 by German Christians affiliated with the Temple Society. The original name of the village was Tempelhof, which comes from the German words Tempel (i.e. temple) and Hof (i.e. yard or farm), in reference to the religious views of the founders.

In the autumn of 1866, Johannes Dreher, Abram Dück and Friedrich Tietz from the Molotschna came to the Caucasus in search of a suitable place for settlement. In the valley of the river Kuma they found an uninhabited piece of land of about 10,000 desyatinas belonging to the Georgian Prince Orbeliani.

In 1868, the representatives of several German colonies travelled to Tiflis, then part of the Russian Empire, to visit the Price Orbeliani: brothers Fickel and Härter from Bessarabia, Abram Dück, Johann Schmidt, Johannes Lange from the Molotschna, Johann Gutwin and Paul Tietz from Igren by Ekaterinoslav. The Prince allowed them to rent his land by the river Kuma for 30 years, at 25 kopecks per desyatina. The colonies Tempelhof and Orbelyanovka were founded on this land in 1868. About 20 families who came from the Gnadenfeld district of the Molotschna Colony and from Ekaterinoslav settled in Tempelhof.

Germans planted vineyards on the rented land and founded a wine-making company called Unitas.

When the rental agreement had expired, the residents of both colonies moved about 200 km to the east, on the land of about 4,500 desyatinas given by the Crown. There the former inhabitants of Orbelyanovka founded the village Romanovka and the former inhabitants of Tempelhof - the village Olgino.

After the departure of the German colonists, Prince Orbeliani sold the estate to the Grand Duke Nicholas Nikolayevich of Russia who owned the land for several years and had a wine cellar there. Then Tempelhof was purchased by the Crown Land Office which had continued to cultivate vineyards there up to the time of the October Revolution.

== Notable residents ==
- Philipp Dreher (1839–1874) - teacher and one of the founders of the village
- Georgy Gogol-Yanovsky (1868–1931) - botanist and winemaker
- Maria Sergiyenko (1910–1995) - collective farm worker, a Hero of Socialist Labor
