= Ozyorsk, Kaliningrad Oblast =

Town in Kaliningrad Oblast, Russia

Ozyorsk Озёрск
- Town
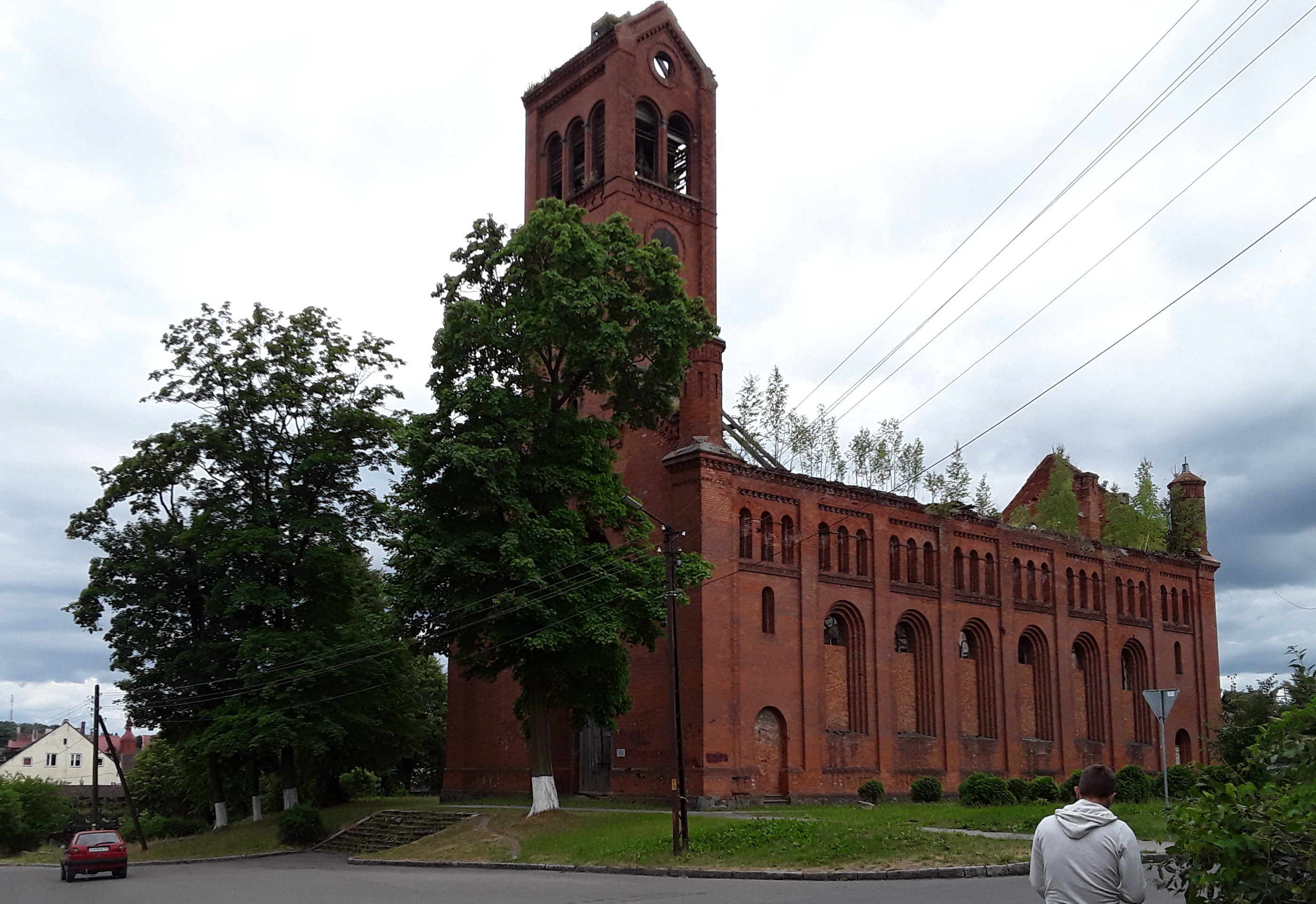
- Old church ruins

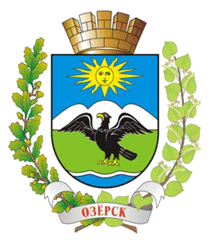
- Coat of arms
- Interactive map of Ozyorsk
- Location of Ozyorsk Ozyorsk (European Russia) Ozyorsk (Russia)
- Coordinates: 54°24′N 22°01′E
- Country: Russia
- Federal subject: Kaliningrad Oblast
- Administrative district: Ozyorsky District
- Town of district significanceSelsoviet: Ozyorsk
- First mentioned: 1539
- Town status since: 1724
- Elevation: 80 m (260 ft)

Population (2010 Census)
  - Total: 4,740
  - Estimate (2023): 4,321 (−8.8%)

Administrative status
  - Capital of: Ozyorsky District, town of district significance of Ozyorsk

Municipal status
  - Municipal district: Ozyorsky Urban Okrug
  - Capital of: Ozyorsky Urban Okrug
- Time zone: UTC+2 (MSK–1)
- Postal code: 238120
- OKTMO ID: 27516000001

Ozyorsk (Russian: Озёрск, until 1938 German: Darkehmen; Polish: Darkiejmy; Lithuanian: Darkiemis; from 1938 to 1946 German: Angerapp) is a town and the administrative center of Ozyorsky District in Kaliningrad Oblast, Russia, located on the Angrapa River near the border with Poland, 120 kilometers (75 mi) southeast of Kaliningrad, the administrative center of the oblast. Population: 4,740 (2010 census); 5,801 (2002 census); 6,219 (1989 Soviet census).

== History ==
=== Early history ===
Before the arrival of the Teutonic Order, the river valley was here settled by the Nadruvians, as evidenced by traces of settlements and fortifications found in the area. Teutonic overlordship was established around 1388, but the town is mentioned for the first time in written sources in 1539 as Darkyem. In 1454, the region was incorporated by King Casimir IV Jagiellon to the Kingdom of Poland upon the request of the anti-Teutonic Prussian Confederation. After the subsequent Thirteen Years' War, since 1466, it formed part of Poland as a fief held by the Teutonic Order, and after 1525 it was located in Ducal Prussia, a vassal duchy of Poland. It was settled by Lithuanian, Polish and German colonists. Located in the transitional area between Masuria in the south and Lithuania Minor in the north, the town and surrounding villages had a mixed population with both many Poles and Lithuanians. The first church was built in 1615. From 1701, it formed part of the Kingdom of Prussia.

=== Town rights ===
In 1724 it was granted town rights by Frederick William I of Prussia. Soon afterwards, the town plan was revised with a market square and a new grid plan. An influx of immigrants followed (in 1725, 103 of the 742 registered inhabitants came from Salzburg) and craft production of leather and cloth established in the town. Polish Jews took part in local fairs, and their products were the most popular. In c. 1736, a garrison of the Bosniak Corps was established.

In the 1740s, the local cloth industry declined, and many clothmakers moved to Insterburg, Tilsit or Poland. The sole prosperous cloth business in the town at that time sold its products to the Polish Royal Guard. During the Seven Years' War, the town was devastated and occupied by Russia. In the late 18th century, clothmaking revived, focusing on exports to Poland and supplying the army, but with the onset of the Napoleonic Wars, it collapsed completely. In June and July 1807, French and Polish troops were stationed in the town. During the Napoleonic Wars, the first Jews settled permanently, arriving from Poznań.

In 1818, it became a district seat. In 1850, the town was linked by a regular postal service with Insterburg and Gołdap. By 1852, the town gained road connections with Insterburg and Gumbinnen, and in 1870 with Gołdap. From 1871 to 1945 the town was part of Germany, within which it was administratively located in the province of East Prussia. In 1878 a railway line was built, bypassing the town by three kilometres. Nine annual fairs were organized in the town in the late 19th century. Due to its location on the Angrapa River, a power station established in the watermill was already in 1880 able to produce electrical light for the town.

=== 20th century ===
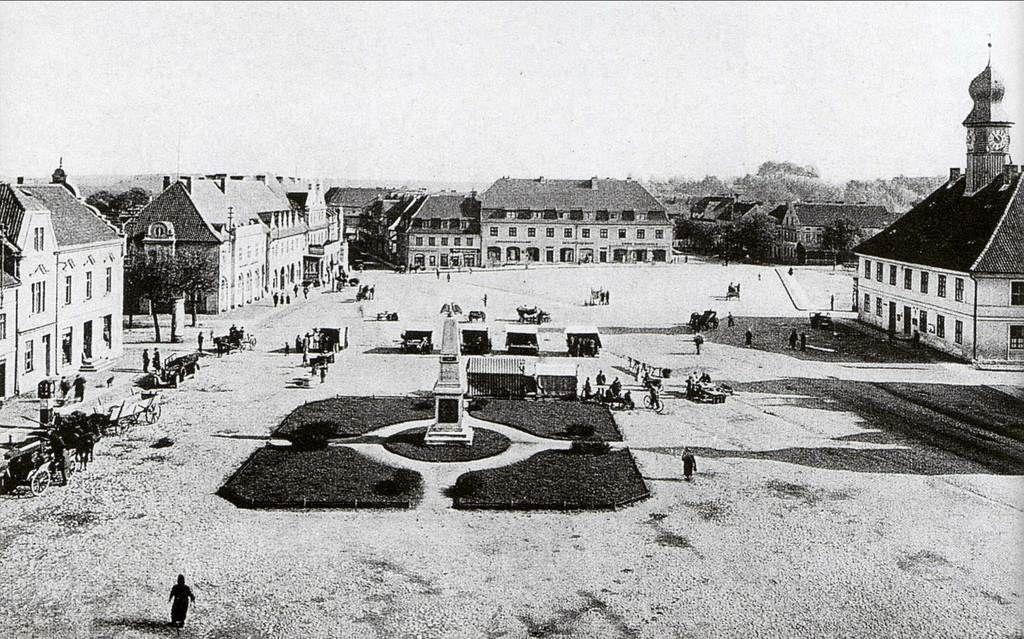
Main square in the 1930s

During World War I, the town was captured by Russians in 1914. It was heavily damaged during fighting but rebuilt after garden city ideals following the war, with financial support from the city of Dresden.

In 1938, the Nazi government renamed the town to Angerapp to erase traces of Lithuanian origin. Two labour camps of the Reich Labour Service were operated in the town under Nazi Germany. It was captured by the 3rd Belorussian Front of the Red Army on 23 January 1945 in the course of the East Prussian offensive.

After Germany's defeat in World War II, the town initially passed to Poland under its historic Polish name Darkiejmy, however, it was soon unilaterally annexed by the Soviet Union in violation of the Polish-Soviet border agreement. Its German populace was expelled in accordance to the Potsdam Agreement. It was renamed as Ozyorsk on 7 September 1946.

In 1970, the Department of Printed Circuits was established as a branch of the Radiotechnical Measuring Instruments Factory in Vilnius.

== Administrative and municipal status ==
Within the framework of administrative divisions, Ozyorsk serves as the administrative center of Ozyorsky District. As an administrative division, it is incorporated (together with the rural locality Ushakovo) within Ozyorsky District as the town of district significance of Ozyorsk.

Within the framework of municipal divisions, since June 11, 2014, the territories of the town of district significance of Ozyorsk and of three rural okrugs of Ozyorsky District are incorporated as Ozyorsky Urban Okrug. Before that, the town of district significance was incorporated within Ozyorsky Municipal District as Ozyorskoye Urban Settlement.

== Demographics ==
Historical population
Year	Pop.	±%
1939	4,336	—
1989	6,219	+43.4%
2002	5,801	−6.7%
2010	4,740	−18.3%
2021	4,152	−12.4%

Distribution of the population by ethnicity according to the 2021 census:

	percent
Russians	82.11%
Armenians	2.46%
Poles	1.90%
Belarusians	1.73%
Ukrainians	1.61%
Germans	1.13%
Lezgins	0.29%
Lithuanians	0.22%
Tatars	0.17%
Moldovans	0.14%
Koreans	0.12%
Mordvins	0.12%
Mari	0.10%
Uzbeks	0.10%
refused answer, no data or no nationality	6.12%

== Culture ==
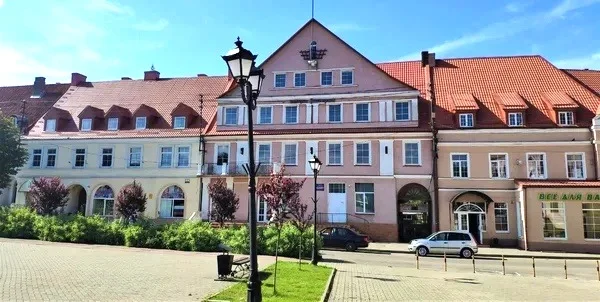
Town center

The Central Library is the town's main public library. The Jan Kochanowski Association of Polish Culture is a cultural institution of the local Polish community, which also offers teaching of Polish language, history, geography and literature.

== Notable people ==
- Gustav Bauer (1870–1944), politician and Chancellor of Germany in 1919–1920
- Ernst Schliepe (1893–1961), composer and conductor
- Heinz Ziegler (1894–1972), Wehrmacht general
- Sergei Skripal (born 23 June 1951), former Russian military intelligence officer who acted as a double agent for the UK's intelligence services during the 1990s and early 2000s.
