= Gonk (disambiguation) =

A gonk is a furry creature toy.

Gonk may also refer to:

- Gonk troll, a plastic doll better known as the troll doll
- Gonk, a mythical creature
- "The Gonk", a song by Herbert Chappell from Dawn of the Dead
- Gonk droid, a fictional robot from Star Wars
- Gonk, a software layer in Firefox OS
