= Gogol (disambiguation) =

Nikolai Gogol (1809–1852) was a Russian-Ukrainian writer.

Gogol may also refer to:

== People ==
=== Surname ===
- Georgy Gogol-Yanovsky (1868–1931), Russian and Soviet botanist
- Jonah Gogol (died 1602), bishop of Pinsk-Turowski
- Mariusz Gogol (born 1991), Polish footballer
- Michał Mieszko Gogol (born 1985), Polish volleyball player and coach
- Nikolay Gogol (canoeist) (1948–1997), Soviet sprint canoer
- Oleg Gogol (born 1968), Belarusian wrestler
- Shmuel Gogol (1924–1993), Holocaust survivor and musician
- Vasili Gogol-Yanovsky (1777–1825), author of a number of theater pieces in Russian and in Ukrainian and father of the writer Nikolai Gogol

=== Stage name ===
- Gogol Premier (born 1957), French punk singer

== Places ==
- Gogol, Goa, a suburb of Margão, Goa, India
- Gogol, Poland, a village
- Gogol River, in Papua New Guinea
- Gogol Center, avant-garde theater

== Fiction ==
- Gogol (film series), Russian series of fantasy-horror films
- Gogol (Samaresh Basu), fictional Indian child detective
  - Gogol, Indian film series based on the character
- General Gogol, character in the James Bond series
- Gogol, organization in Nikita
- Erzulie Gogol, Discworld character
- Griffin Gogol, Marvel comics character
- Gogol Ganguli, character in the film The Namesake, as well as the novel it was based upon
- Doctor Gogol, a character from the 1935 film Mad Love
- Nikolai Gogol, a character in the manga series Bungou Stray Dogs and associated media

== Other uses ==
- 2361 Gogol, asteroid
- Gogol (crater), on Mercury

== See also ==
- Google (disambiguation)
- Googol, a number
- Gogol mogol or Kogel mogel, a dessert
