= Google (disambiguation) =

Google is an American multinational corporation specializing in internet-related services and products.

Google, Googal, or Googol may also refer to:

== Google LLC ==
- Google Search, a web search engine
  - Google (verb), using the Google search engine to obtain information on something or somebody on the World Wide Web
- .google, a Google-operated internet top-level domain
- goo.gl, a URL shortening service
- Alphabet Inc., Google's holding company which trades as "GOOG" and "GOOGL" on the Nasdaq
- List of Google products

== Places ==
- Googal, Devadurga (sometimes spelled Google), a village in India
- Google, temporary name of Topeka, Kansas, United States

== Fictional characters ==
- Google, monster in The Google Book (1913) by Vincent Cartwright Vickers
- Google, clown in Circus Days Again (1942) by Enid Blyton
- Barney Google, in the comic strip Barney Google and Snuffy Smith
- Google, on Sesame Street

== Other uses ==
- Google (given name), Swedish given name
- "Google", a song by Chinna, Sravana Bhargavi and Andrea from the 2012 Indian film Rebel

== See also ==
- Goggles, a protective eyewear
- Goggles!, a 1969 children's picture book
- "Google Google", a song from the 2012 Indian film Thuppakki
- Gogol (disambiguation)
- Googly (disambiguation)
- Googol, the number 10^{100} (represented by the digit 1 followed by 100 zeroes)
