= Georgy Gogol-Yanovsky =

Russian botanist

- Георгий Иванович Гоголь-Яновский
- Born: 20 April 1868; Poltava Governorate, Russian Empire
- Died: 2 February 1931 (aged 62); Leningrad, Soviet Union
- Citizenship: Russian Empire (1868–1917) → RSFSR (1917–1922) → Soviet Union (1922–1931)
- Education: Saint Petersburg Imperial University
- Known for: wine-making technology
- Scientific career
- Fields: Oenology, Viticulture
- Workplaces: Narkomzem of the USSR, Moscow Timiryazev Agricultural Academy

Georgy Ivanovich Gogol-Yanovsky (Russian: Гео́ргий Ива́нович Го́голь-Яно́вский; 20 April 1868 – 2 February 1931) was a Russian and Soviet botanist, teacher, wine-maker and government official.

== Life ==
Georgy Gogol-Yanovsky was born in 1868 in Poltava Governorate of the Russian Empire. His lineage was of the noble family house of Gogol-Yanovsky. In 1890, he graduated from the Physics and Mathematics faculty of the Saint Petersburg Imperial University. After briefly working at the botany department of the university, he traveled to the Caucasus. Starting from 1893 he worked as a wine-maker in Kakheti, in the estate Tsinandali, and from 1893 as the head of the Crown Land Office's wine cellar in Tiflis, where Caucasus wines were produced. In 1908, Gogol-Yanovsky was appointed as the lead manager of the Tempelhof estate with 150 desyatinas of vineyards, belonging to the Crown Land Office. There he managed the production of table wines and cognacs. From 1912 he worked as an assistant of the inspector of viticulture and wine-making, and then as a manager of the Moscow wine cellar of the Crown Land Office. After the October Revolution, Gogol-Yanovsky was in charge of a department at Narkomzem of the USSR and worked as a viticulture and wine-making specialist there. He wrote books on wine-making and viticulture as well as visited various scientific conferences in the USSR, where he met such prominent botanists as Nikolai Vavilov. Starting from the 1920 he was a senior lecturer and professor at the Moscow Timiryazev Agricultural Academy, where he led the department of viticulture.

Gogol-Yanovsky died in Leningrad on February 2, 1931, after a brief illness.

== Achievements ==
- Introduced the European method of making the white wine in Kakheti, without fermenting the pomace
- Improved the technology of making the Riesling, Cabernet Sauvignon, Silvaner and other wines
- Developed unified regulations for fortifying and chaptalization of the wine

== Works ==
- Vineyards and Wine-making in France and Germany. Printing of the Tiflis Metekhi Penitentiary Castle, Tiflis, 1897.
- Goals of the Rational Viticulture and Wine-making. Printing of K. P. Kozlovsky, Tiflis, 1898.
- Handbook of Viticulture. State Publishing House, Moscow-Leningrad, 1928.
- Handbook of Wine-Making. State Publishing House of Agricultural Kolkhoz and Cooperative Literature, Moscow-Leningrad, 1932.
