= Philipp Dreher =

German teacher and religious leader

- Born: 1839
- Died: 31 August 1874
- Occupation: Teacher

Philipp Dreher (1839 – 31 August 1874) was a German teacher and member of the Temple Society.

== Life ==
In January 1866, Philipp Dreher came to Russia from Württemberg. As a teacher, he took part in the foundation of the villages Orbelyanovka and Tempelhof in the North Caucasus. He was elected mayor of both villages and helped new settlers on their arrival there. In the winter of 1867-68, Dreher ran a school for children of German immigrants who came from Bessarabia. At the beginning of 1870s, he was invited to work as a teacher in the Palestinian settlement Sarona, where he moved in 1872.

On 31 August 1874, Philipp Dreher died of Malaria.
