= Old Armenian Town, Fresno, California =

Coordinates: 36.7325°N 119.7819°W

Old Armenian Town in Fresno, California, is a former enclave of Armenian immigrants. Community gathering places include the Armenian Community Center on Ventura Street and the Holy Trinity Armenian Apostolic Church. There are also restaurants and delis that specialize in Armenian cuisine.

As of 2020, there were plans to redevelop the area. The new project, also dubbed "Old Armenian Town" is to contain a courthouse for California's Fifth Appellate District Court of Appeals, a major multi-story commercial office building, and an Armenian Museum.

There have been renewed efforts for the historic preservation of the neighborhood.

== See also ==
- Armenian Americans
- List of Armenian ethnic enclaves
