= Squirmles =

Worm-like toys

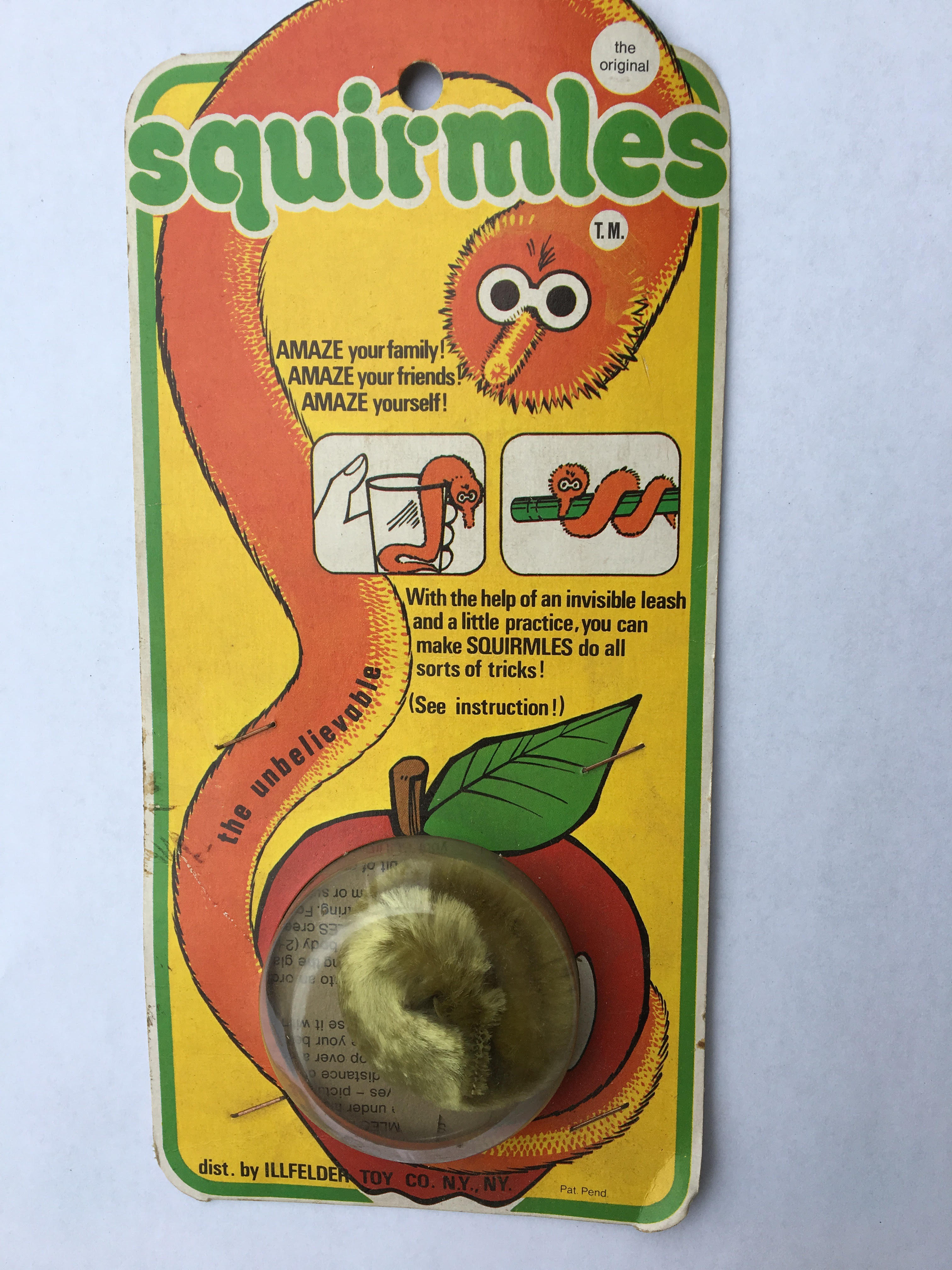
Original 1970's Squirmles

Squirmles (also known as Snoots, Magic Twisty Worms, Wiggle Worms, or Worm on a String) are small, worm-like toys with eyes, a furry body, and a hidden string used to imitate a live worm, sometimes used as a magic trick. A popular toy released in the mid-1970s by the Illfelder Importing Company, Squirmles come in a variety of colors and are measured at 8.5 by 0.5 in (21.6 by 1.3 cm). They are typically found in discount stores in the United States.

The original toy came in the colors pink, orange, blue, yellow, green, and purple. Later, new colors were made available, such as red, navy, black, white, aquamarine, and multicolored. There are many more colors now, and packages of 100 or 200 of these worms are available.

In late 2019, Squirmles rose in popularity as an Internet meme by the name of worm on a string, often popular on social media, they have been used in art projects such as jackets, door beads, and earrings. Some multicolored versions consist of colors found on pride flags. A "worm on a string" named Wormston has been used as the mascot of the art competition Art Fight.

== Use in fly fishing ==
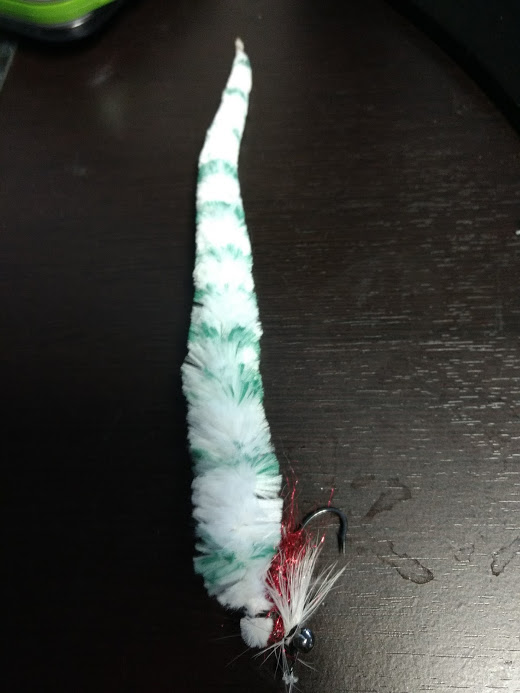
Dragontail-fly with fishing hook attached

Squirmles have gained a second life as a material used in fly fishing. Re-branded as "Dragon Tails", they can be tied onto a hook and the same properties which made them appear like live worms on land, make them appear lifelike to fish as well.

== See also ==
- Gonk
- Googly eyes
- Weepul
