= Illfelder Importing Company =

American toy company

Illfelder Importing Company (formerly Berolzheimer, Illfelder & Co.) was an American toy company, founded in 1856, that created toys like "Squirmles" and "Good Time Charlie".

== Timeline ==
- 1856: Leopold Illfelder and Daniel Berolzheimer founded the Vera-Bleistift-Fabrik pencil factory in Fürth, Bavaria, Germany.
- 1858: Daniel Berolzheimer died, and was replaced by his son, Heinrich Berolzheimer.
- 1861: A US branch, Berolzheimer, Illfelder & Co. was created in New York City.
- 1860s-70s: Work with pencils, stationery, and importing at 60 John Street.
- c.1870: Name shortened to B. Illfelder & Co.
- 1888: Death of Bernhard Illfelder.
- 1938: Move to 131 East 23rd st.

== Notable people ==
- Leopold Illfelder - co-founded the original pencil company in 1856
- Daniel Berolzheimer - co-founded the original pencil company in 1856
- Heinrich Berolzheimer (1836-1906) - son of founder Daniel Berolzheimer, took over his father's role after his death.
- Bernhard Illfelder (1842-1888) - came to the U.S. in 1864. Stepson of Leopold and a brother of Max.
- Max Illfelder (1854-1943) - brother of Bernhard.

== Products ==
- Squirmles
- Good Time Charlie
