= Otradnoye, Ozyorsky District =

Settlement in Kaliningrad Oblast

Otradnoye Отрадное
- Rural locality
- Interactive map of Otradnoye
- Location of Otradnoye Otradnoye (European Russia) Otradnoye (Russia)
- Coordinates: 54°23′N 21°54′E
- Country: Russia
- Federal subject: Kaliningrad Oblast
- Administrative district: Ozyorsky District

Population
  - Estimate (2021): 115 )
- Time zone: UTC+2 (MSK–1)
- Postal code: 238134
- OKTMO ID: 27716000496

Otradnoye (Russian: Отрадное, Polish: Kunigiele) is a rural settlement in Ozyorsky District of Kaliningrad Oblast, Russia, close to the border with Poland.

== Demographics ==
Distribution of the population by ethnicity according to the 2021 census:

	percent
Russians	60.00%
Armenians	37.39%
