= Reznikovo, Kaliningrad Oblast =

Settlement in Kaliningrad Oblast

Reznikovo Резниково
- Rural locality
- Interactive map of Reznikovo
- Location of Reznikovo Reznikovo (European Russia) Reznikovo (Russia)
- Coordinates: 54°23′N 22°5′E
- Country: Russia
- Federal subject: Kaliningrad Oblast
- Administrative district: Ozyorsky District

Population
  - Estimate (2021): 53 )
- Time zone: UTC+2 (MSK–1)
- Postal codes: 238126, 238134
- OKTMO ID: 27716000176

Reznikovo (Russian: Резниково, Polish: Rożniki) is a rural settlement in Ozyorsky District of Kaliningrad Oblast, Russia, close to the border with Poland.

== Demographics ==
Distribution of the population by ethnicity according to the 2021 census:

	percent
Russians	60.38%
Armenians	30.77%
Poles	5.77%
