= Orbelyanovka =

Orbelyanovka Орбельяновка
- Interactive map of Orbelyanovka
- Location of Orbelyanovka Orbelyanovka (European Russia) Orbelyanovka (Europe)
- Coordinates: 44°13′55″N 42°53′11″E
- Country: Russia
- Federal subject: Stavropol Krai

Population
  - Estimate (2021): 1,436 )
- Time zone: UTC+3 (MSK)
- Postal code: 357224
- OKTMO ID: 07721000271

Orbelyanovka (Russian: Орбельяновка, German: Orbeljanowka) is a rural locality (a selo) in Stavropol Krai, in southern Russia.

== Location ==
Orbelyanovka is located in the North Caucasus, around 20 km west of Mineralnye Vody, and around 25 km northwest of the health resort city Pyatigorsk. The village lies on the right bank of Kuma River at 400 m above the sea level, to the north of the so-called Camel Mountain with two distinctive humps.

== History ==
Orbelyanovka was founded in 1868 by German Christians affiliated with the Temple Society.

The village owns its name to the former landowner, the Georgian Prince Orbeliani. In the autumn of 1866, Johannes Dreher, Abram Dück and Friedrich Tietz from the Molotschna came to the Caucasus in search of a suitable place for settlement. In the valley of the river Kuma they found an uninhabited piece of land of about 10,000 desyatinas belonging to Orbeliani.

In 1867, the representatives of several German colonies travelled to Tiflis, then part of the Russian Empire, to visit the Price Orbeliani: brothers Fickel and Härter from Bessarabia, Abram Dück, Johann Schmidt, Johannes Lange from the Molotschna, Johann Gutwin and Paul Tietz from Igren by Ekaterinoslav. The Prince allowed them to rent his land by the river Kuma for 30 years, at 25 kopecks per desyatina. The colonies Tempelhof and Orbelyanovka were founded on this land in 1868. About 30 families who came from Bessarabia to settle in Orbelyanovka originally stemmed from Württemberg.

When the rental agreement had expired, the residents of both colonies moved about 200 km to the east, on the land of about 4,500 desyatinas given by the Crown. There the former inhabitants of Orbelyanovka founded the village Romanovka and the former inhabitants of Tempelhof - the village Olgino.

In 1942, during the World War II, Orbelyanovka was captured by German troops and then retaken by the Soviet army at the beginning of 1943.

== Notable residents ==
- Philipp Dreher - teacher and one of the founders of the village
- Ludmila Sergeeva - painter
