= Holy Trinity Church, Fresno =

Historic church in California, United States

Holy Trinity Armenian Apostolic Church
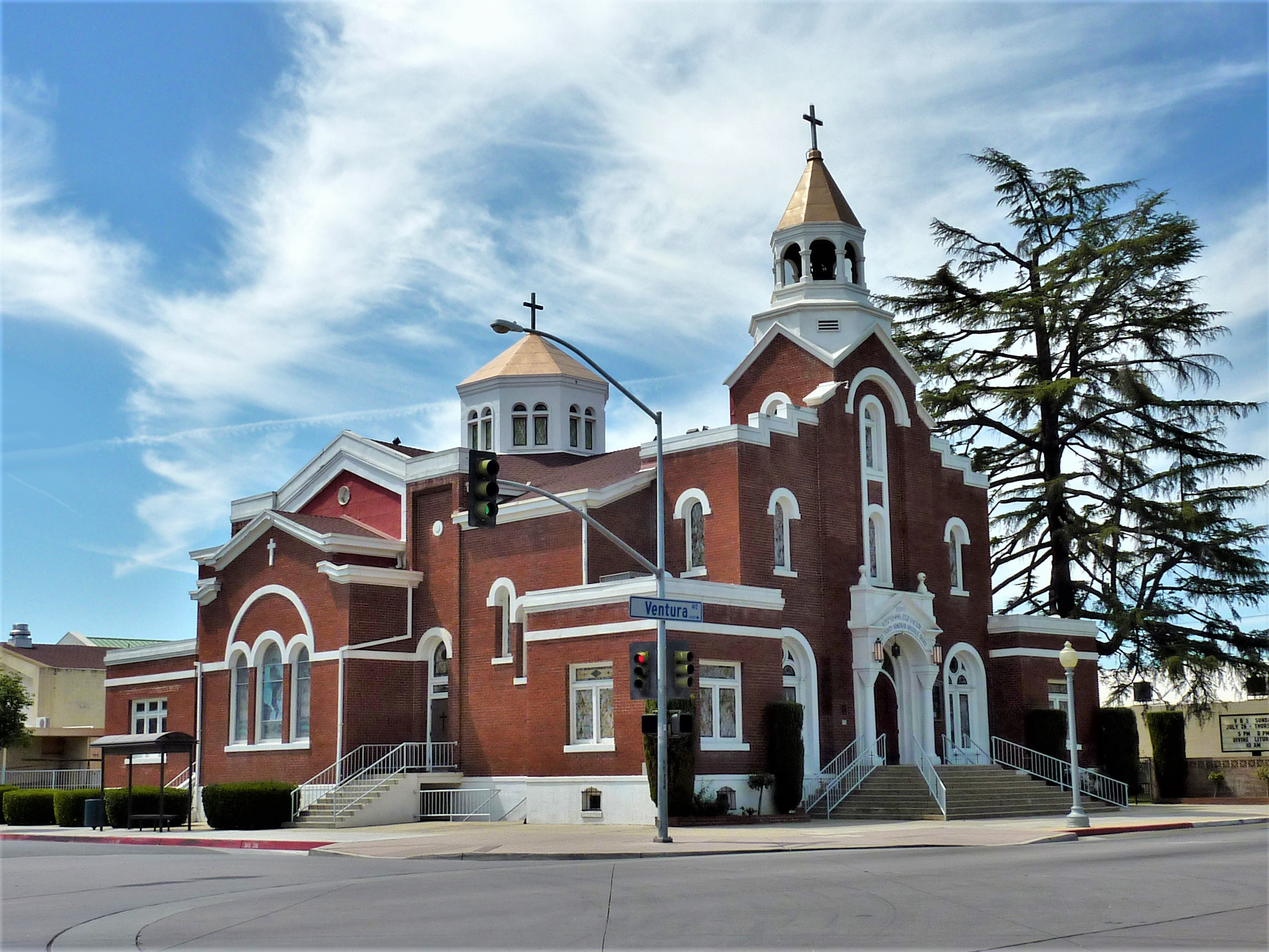
- The Holy Trinity Church in 2009

Religion
- Affiliation: Western Prelacy of the Armenian Apostolic Church of America

Location
- Location: 2226 Ventura Street, Fresno, California, U.S.
- Interactive map of Holy Trinity Armenian Apostolic Church
- Coordinates: 36.731694°N 119.782639°W

Architecture
- Architect: Lawrence Karekin Condrajian (Cone)
- Style: Revivalism, Armenian influence
- Groundbreaking: November 1, 1913
- Completed: December 13, 1914
- Construction cost: $25,000 ($757,000 in 2022)

Specifications
- Capacity: 660
- Height (max): 68 ft (21 m)
- U.S. National Register of Historic Places
- Official name: Holy Trinity Armenian Apostolic Church
- Designated: July 31, 1986
- Reference no.: 86002097

Website
- holytrinityfresno.org

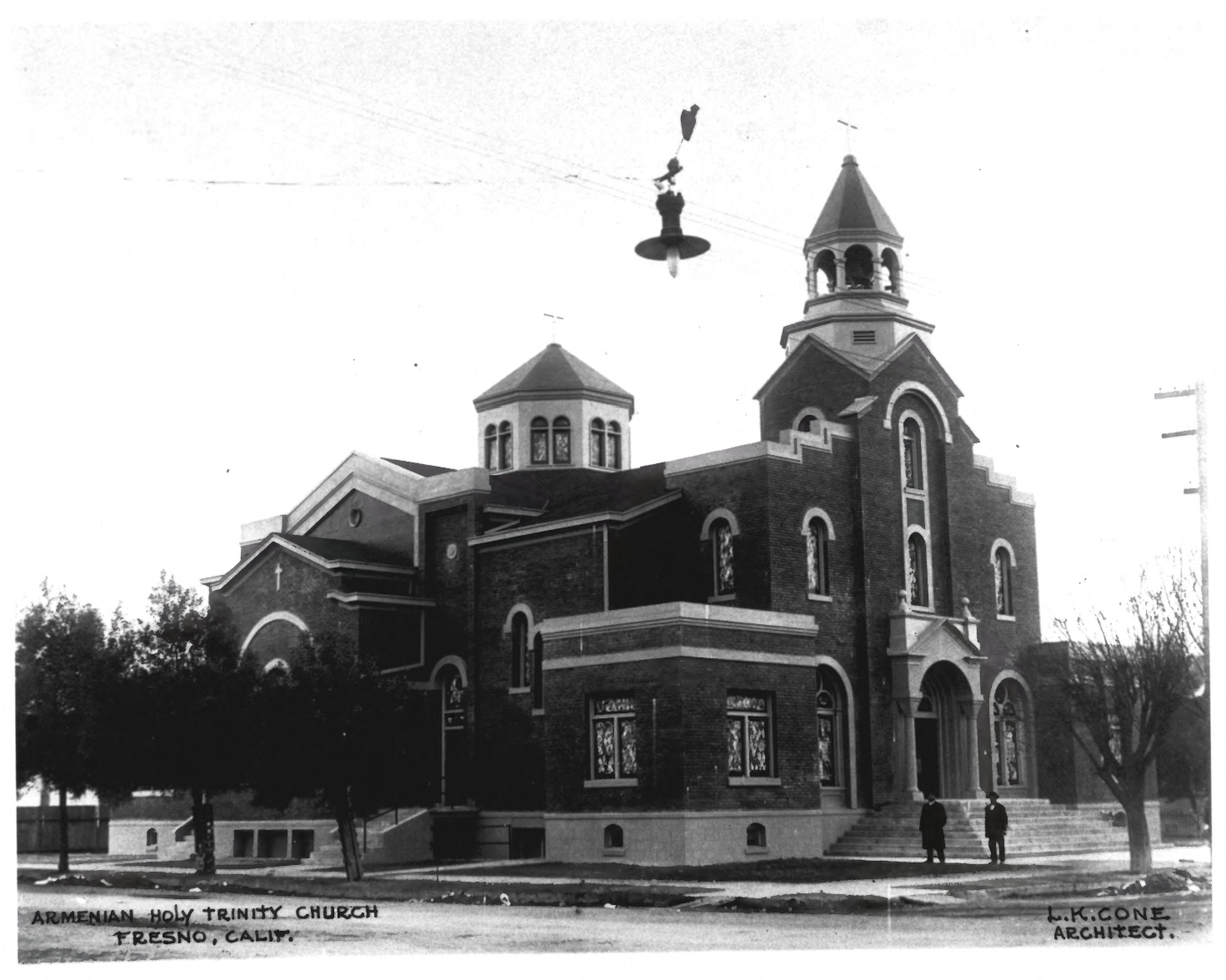
The church in 1914

Holy Trinity Church (Armenian: Ֆրեզնոյի Սուրբ Երրորդութիւն եկեղեցի, Freznoyi Surp Yerortutiun yegeghetsi) is an Armenian Apostolic church in Fresno, California. Completed in 1914, it is one of the earliest Armenian churches in America and the first to incorporate traditional Armenian architecture.

== History ==
=== Background ===
The first Armenians settled in Fresno in the early 1870s. The first joint Armenian Apostolic and Protestant service was held in 1883 at the First Congregational Church of Fresno. Subsequently, joint Armenian rite services were held in a rented church by Father Aharon Melkonian. By 1899, the membership of the parish reached 150 and a general meeting decided to build a separate church. On April 1, 1900, the Holy Trinity Church was established at the corner of F and Monterey Streets. The construction of the church, a simple wooden structure, was completed in six months and consecration took place on October 1, 1900. It was officiated by Bishop Hovsep Sarajian. It was the second Armenian church to be built in America after the Church of Worcester, Massachusetts. An Armenian school with some 85 students operated in the adjacent building. By 1910, around 4,000 Armenians lived in Fresno (out of the 5,000 in all of California).

=== Current church ===
In 1911 the trustees of the church decided to buy land for a new, larger church. A land lot was purchased for $3,000 at the corner of M Street and Ventura Avenue in 1912. The old church was destroyed in a fire on July 9, 1913. The groundbreaking of the new church took place on November 1, 1913, and cornerstone laying on January 4, 1914. The first Divine Liturgy (Badarak) took place in the basement on Palm Sunday, April 12, 1914. The consecration took place on December 13, 1914 with Bishop Moushegh Seropian of Boston officiating. The architect of the new church was Lawrence Karekin Cone (Condrajian), also known as L. K. Cone. The cost of construction stood at $25,000. It became the first Armenian church to be built in the US in the traditional Armenian church architecture. The area where the church is located is known as "Armenian Town" for its historical Armenian population. It remained a predominantly Armenian area until the mid-1950s.

=== Later history ===
In 1927 the Western Diocese of the Armenian Church of North America was established. The church was designated as the cathedral of the diocese, while Bishop Karekin Khachdourian as Primate, who served as pastor until 1933.

In 1933, after the murder of Leon Tourian, the primate of the Eastern Diocese, in New York City by a group of Dashnaks, a pro-Soviet group broke away from the pro-Dashnak Holy Trinity Church and formed St Paul's Church in 1939 under the jurisdiction of the Mother See of Holy Etchmiadzin.

In 1956 a new building containing a social hall, kitchen and classroom was built next to the church.

The church was added to the National Register of Historic Places on July 31, 1986.

It is currently one of the six Armenian churches in the Fresno area.

== Architecture ==
The architect of the church was Lawrence Karekin Cone (Condrajian), also known as L. K. Cone. It combines American Revivalism and traditional Armenian architecture. The entrance is in the Beaux-Arts style. The exterior is mostly brick masonry, while the two domes are made of galvanized sheet metal.

The church is 71 ft (22 m) wide, 103 ft (31 m) long and 68 ft (21 m) high. It has a seating capacity of 660.

The church has a basement, main floor and gallery level with a total of 12,250 ft^{2} (1,138 m^{2}). The interior is entirely painted in beige. In 1982 Kero Antoyan painted murals on the four pendentives. The church contains paintings of the Christ and Mary, St. Sahak and St. Mesrop Mashtots.
