= Ernst Schliepe =

German composer and conductor

Ernst Heinrich Schliepe (Darkehmen, 25 May 1893 – Berlin, 10 April 1961) was a German composer and conductor.

The son of a veterinarian, Schliepe studied music in Königsberg, Bonn, and Berlin. From 1921 he was engaged as a music critic for various publications in Berlin. He joined the NSDAP in 1932 and was active in cultural campaigns, notably the boycotting of Paul Hindemith. After the war, his works were prohibited from public performance.

== Selected works ==
=== Stage works ===
- Der Herr von gegenüber, Werk 29, opera in 1 act. Premiered 24 February 1934, Danzig
- Marienburg, Werk 36, opera in 4 acts. Premiered 24 January 1942, Danzig

=== Solo works ===
- Sechs Tonbilder, Werk 24, for piano
- Variationen und Fugue über ein altes Lied "In stiller Nacht", Werk 25, for harp
- Klaviermusik (Sonata), Werk 37, for piano (1943)
- Musik für Cemablo, Werk 41, for harpsichord

=== Arrangements ===
- Te Deum by Otto Nicolai
- Nacht am Bosporus, arrangement of Indigo und die vierzig Räuber by Johann Strauss II
