= Weepul =

Fluffy toy

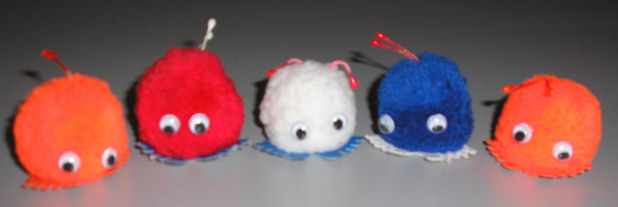
- Five weepul toys in various colors
- Other names: weeple, wuppie, wuppet
- Type: Promotional merchandise
- Invented by: Tom Blundell (BIPO, Inc.)
- Company: Weepuline, LLC
- Country: United States
- Availability: 1971–present
- Slogan: creative, effective promotion
- Official website

The weepul (also known as a weeple, wuppie, or wuppet) is a small, spherical, fluffy pom-pom toy, with large, plastic googly eyes, and no limbs. Usually, weepuls possess antennae and also large paper feet, with an adhesive layer on the bottom, which is protected by a layer of plastic that is peeled off before deployment.

The weepul was created in 1971 by the Oklahoma City promotional firm, Bipo Inc. It was named by owner Tom Blundell after a stuffed doll his parents had taken to market several years earlier. In the Netherlands, the weepul was introduced as a marketing tool in the 1980s by the name of Wuppie, which was created by Tom Bodt and Eduard van Wensen who had been inspired by Weeples. The wuppies became extremely popular in the summer of 1981. Twenty-five years later, wuppies made a comeback in the Netherlands.

== Description ==
A weepul is a small, spherical, fluffy pom-pom toy, with large, plastic googly eyes, and no limbs. Weepuls come in various colors. Usually, weepuls possess antennae and also large paper feet, with an adhesive layer on the bottom, which is protected by a layer of plastic that is peeled off before deployment.

== History ==
According to Rick Ebel, the weepul was created in 1971 by the Oklahoma City promotional firm, Bipo Inc. It was named by owner Tom Blundell after a stuffed doll his parents had taken to market several years earlier. Blundell figured the little-people stick-on would only be a flash in the pan, "but it just got a life to it, and it still isn't ready to die".

In the Netherlands, the weepul was introduced as a marketing tool in the 1980s by the name of Wuppie. The Wuppie was created by Tom Bodt and Eduard van Wensen, two promotion salesmen, who had been inspired by Weeples—which he discovered during a trip in the US in the 1970s. The Wuppies became popular after Father Abraham featured the wuppies in one of his songs. "World unique promotional product identity and emotion" is a backronym for wuppie.

The wuppies became extremely popular in the summer of 1981. Wuppies were often given out as a prize from 1–900 numbers in the 1980s.

=== Netherlands comeback ===
Twenty-five years later, wuppies made a comeback in the Netherlands. In 2006, the Dutch supermarket chain Albert Heijn re-introduced wuppies in a new campaign connected to the 2006 FIFA World Cup under the motto Wup Holland Wup, a variation of Hup Holland Hup (Go Holland Go), a Dutch football chant. Albert Heijn used wuppies produced in orange, red, white and blue as a collectible trading stamp, functioning as part of a loyalty program. Three wuppies and a fee of €2.49 Euro could be exchanged for a "mega wup". Albert Heijn's wuppie campaign with the World Cup Wuppie Song ("With a Wup, we will win the World Cup") proved popular. Dutch media reported that cars which displayed such "mega wup" on their dashboards were sometimes broken into. A classroom of an elementary school in The Hague was burgled for its many wuppies on display in the window sills.

== See also ==
- Furby
- Gonk
- Squirmles
