= Plavni, Kaliningrad Oblast =

Plavni Плавни
- Rural locality
- Interactive map of Plavni
- Location of Plavni Plavni (European Russia) Plavni (Russia)
- Coordinates: 54°22′N 22°17′E
- Country: Russia
- Federal subject: Kaliningrad Oblast
- Administrative district: Ozyorsky District

Population
  - Estimate (2021): 95 )
- Time zone: UTC+2 (MSK–1)
- Postal code: 238125
- OKTMO ID: 27716000216

Plavni (Russian: Плавни, Polish: Pławiszki) is a rural settlement in Ozyorsky District of Kaliningrad Oblast, Russia, close to the border with Poland. It is located in the historic region of Masuria.

Initially following World War II, in 1945, the village passed to Poland as Pławiszki, however, it was eventually annexed by the Soviet Union and renamed to Plavni.

== Demographics ==
Distribution of the population by ethnicity according to the 2021 census:

	percent
Russians	46.32%
Armenians	42.11%
Belarusians	3.16%
Azeris	2.11%
no data	4.21%
