= Bosniak Corps =

Bosniakenkorps Bošnjački korpus
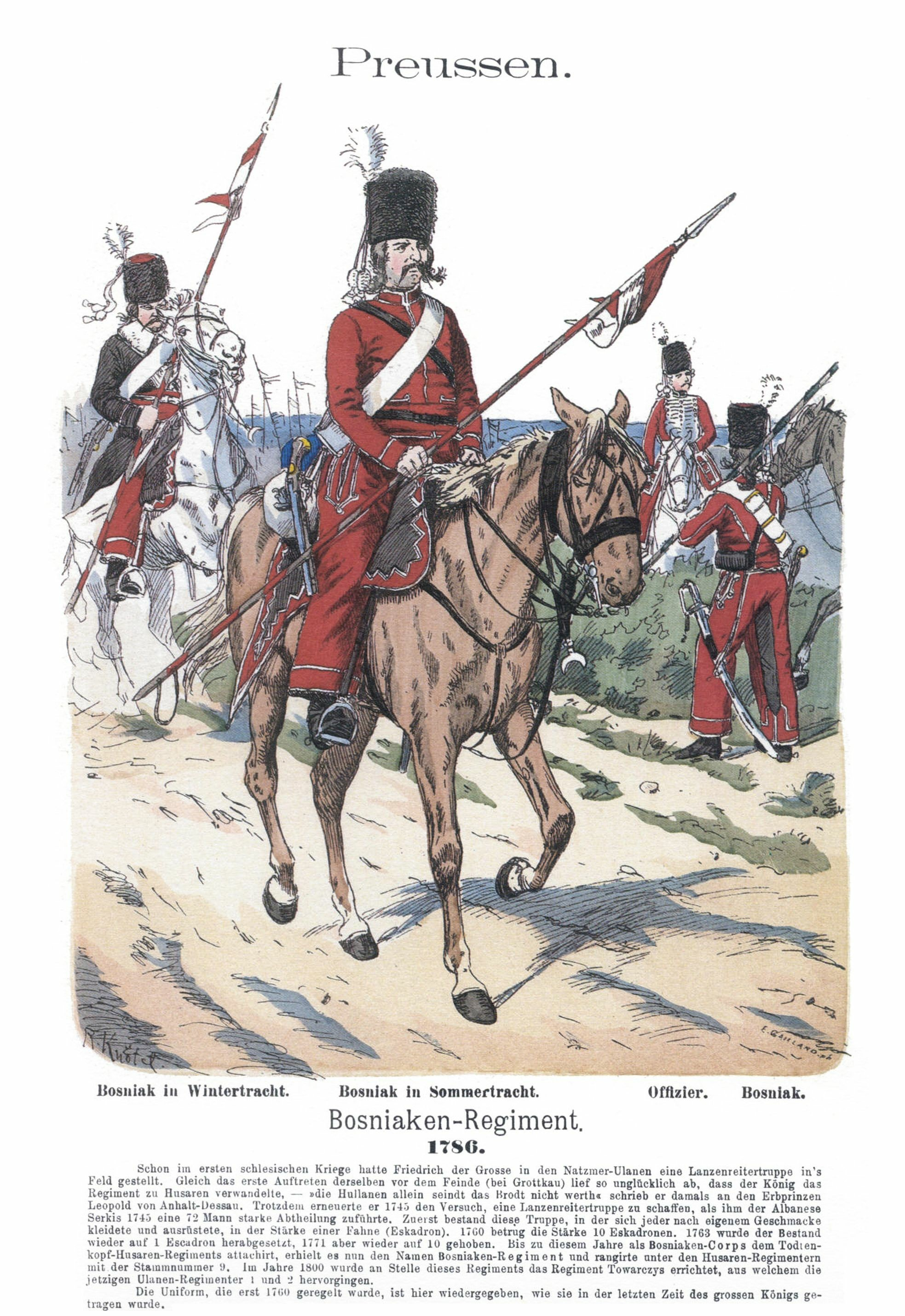
- Preussisches Bosniaken-Regiment 1786
- Active: 1741–1806
- Country: Kingdom of Prussia
- Branch: Army
- Type: Lancers
- Size: Approx. 1,000
- Part of: 1st Hussar Regiment "von Ruesch"
- Engagements: Seven Years' War; First Silesian War; Second Silesian War

The Bosniak Corps (German: Bosniakenkorps, Serbo-Croatian: Bošnjački korpus) was a Prussian Army unit of lancers of Bosnian origin. In 1745 they were organised in the 1st Hussar Regiment "von Ruesch".

== History ==
The army has frequently performed functions of a Gendarmerie, or as the military police of the modern military. Bosniak army soldiers wore distinctive, high fur hats, decorated pony tails and ropes, they wore emblems of the province in which they served. As for weapons, they used their swords and spears, as well as their counterparts in the Imperial Army - Cossacks.

The first time they fought was during the First Silesian War , and numbered nearly 1,000 men. As well the Second Silesian War and Seven Years' War

== Origin ==
The ethnic composition of the Prussian Bosniaks has not been finally clarified. Originally, it was assumed in the literature that they were all Bosnians because of the name, i.e. they came from Bosnia and were exclusively or predominantly Muslim Bosnians. Subsequent statements contradict this: Serkis' troops were of Bosnian, Albanian, Turkish, Polish and Tatar origin or there were no Bosnians at all.

== Other armies ==
Bosniaks (Polish: Bośniacy) were also in the Polish army in the first half of the 18th century. However, the Bosniaks led a marginal existence alongside the Uhlans, who were part of the Polish military at the same time . Bosniaks are also mentioned as lancers in the Danish hussars. There, based on the Prussian model, a squadron of lancers was equipped with similarly fantastic uniforms. The Prussian Bosniaks were also a model for the Netherlands when they set up the "Bosnian Uhlans" (Bosniaques) as a lancer formation.

== Literature ==
- Zemaljski muzej Bosne i Hercegovine, Wissenschaftliche Mitteilungen aus Bosnien und der Herzegowina Band 8, Das Museum, 1902
- David v. Dziengel: Geschichte des Königlichen Zweiten Ulanen-Regiments: zugleich enthaltend: Die Geschichte der Towarczys von 1675; die Geschichte der Bosniaken von 1745; des Tartaren-Pulks von 1795; der Towarczys von 1800, [...], Potsdam 1858. Digitalisat der ULB Düsseldorf

== See also ==
- Bosnian-Herzegovinian Infantry
- Ulanen
- Volontaires de Saxe
- Towarzysz
- Pocztowy
