= Gaikodzor =

Rural locality in Anapa Urban Okrug, Krasnodar Krai, Russia

Coordinates: 44°51′N 37°25′E

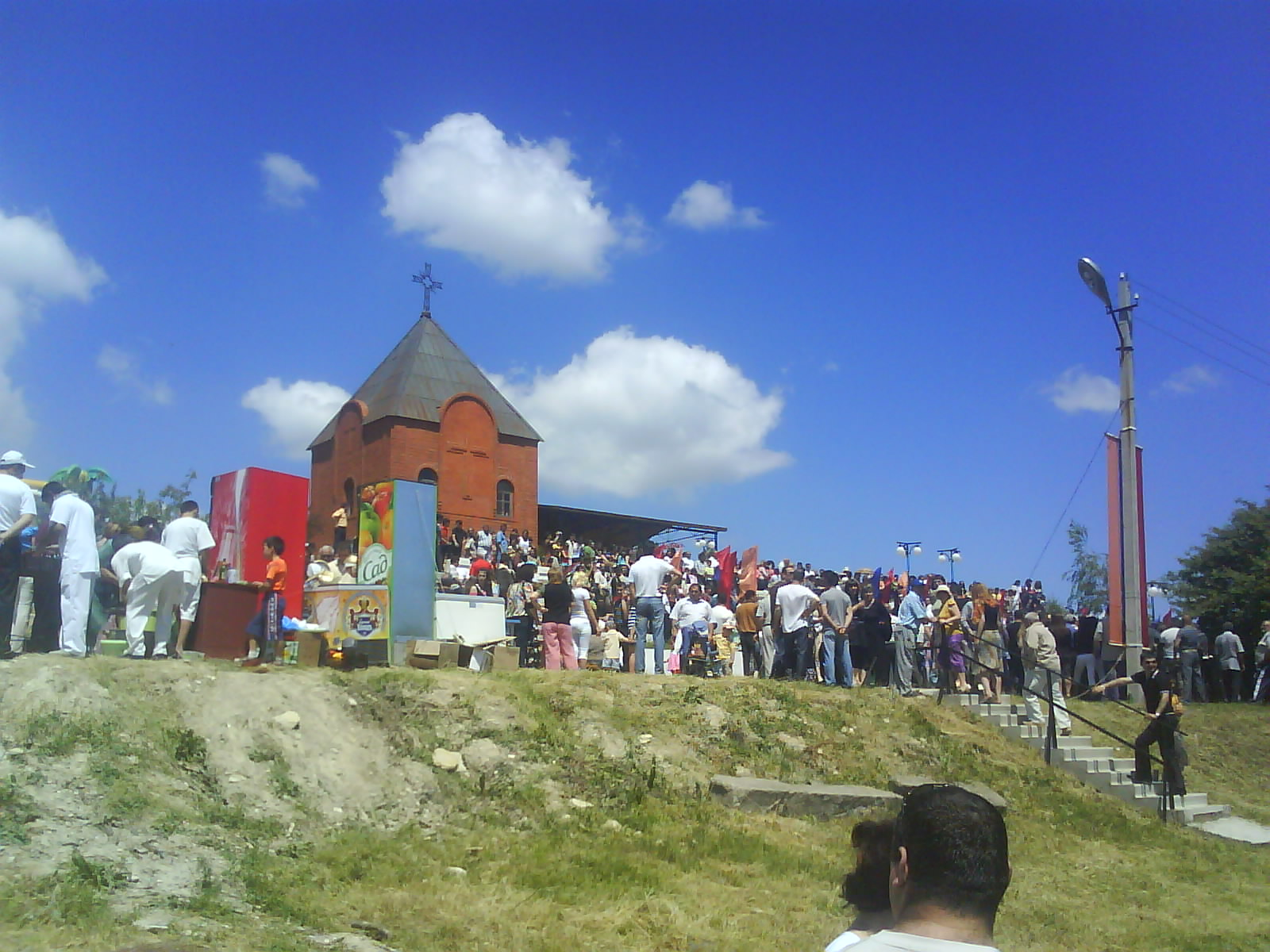
Khachkar holiday in Gajkodzor

Gaikodzor (in Russian Гайкодзор or officially Гай-Кодзо́р, in Armenian Հայկաձոր pronounced Haikadzor) is an Armenian village in the Krasnodar Krai region, Russia, part of the Anapksky District of Anapsky Urban Okrug.

The village was originally named Galkina Shel (in Russian Галкина Щель) in 1908.

On 8 October 1925, the village was renamed Gaykodzor (Armenian pronunciation Haikadzor - meaning the Valley of the Armenians).

The village has the Armenian Apostolic Surb Sargis Church (in Russian Церковь Святого Сергия, in Armenian Սուրբ Սարգիս եկեղեցի) and the Armenian Arin-Bert cultural union.

== See also ==
- Armenians in Russia
- List of Armenian ethnic enclaves
