= Googly eyes =

Small plastic circles imitating eyes

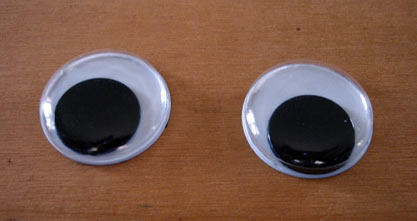
Two googly eyes

Googly eyes, or wiggle eyes, are small plastic crafting items used to imitate eyeballs. Googly eyes traditionally are composed of a white plastic or card backing covered by a clear, hard-plastic shell, encapsulating a black plastic disc. The combination of a black circle over a white disk mimics the appearance of the sclera and pupil of the eye to humorous effect. The inner black disk is able to move freely within the larger clear plastic shell, which makes the eyes appear to move when the googly eyes are tilted or shaken. The term is also used more broadly to describe a visual style characterized by oversized eyes with loosely moving or erratic pupils, particularly in puppetry, animation, and cartoon design.

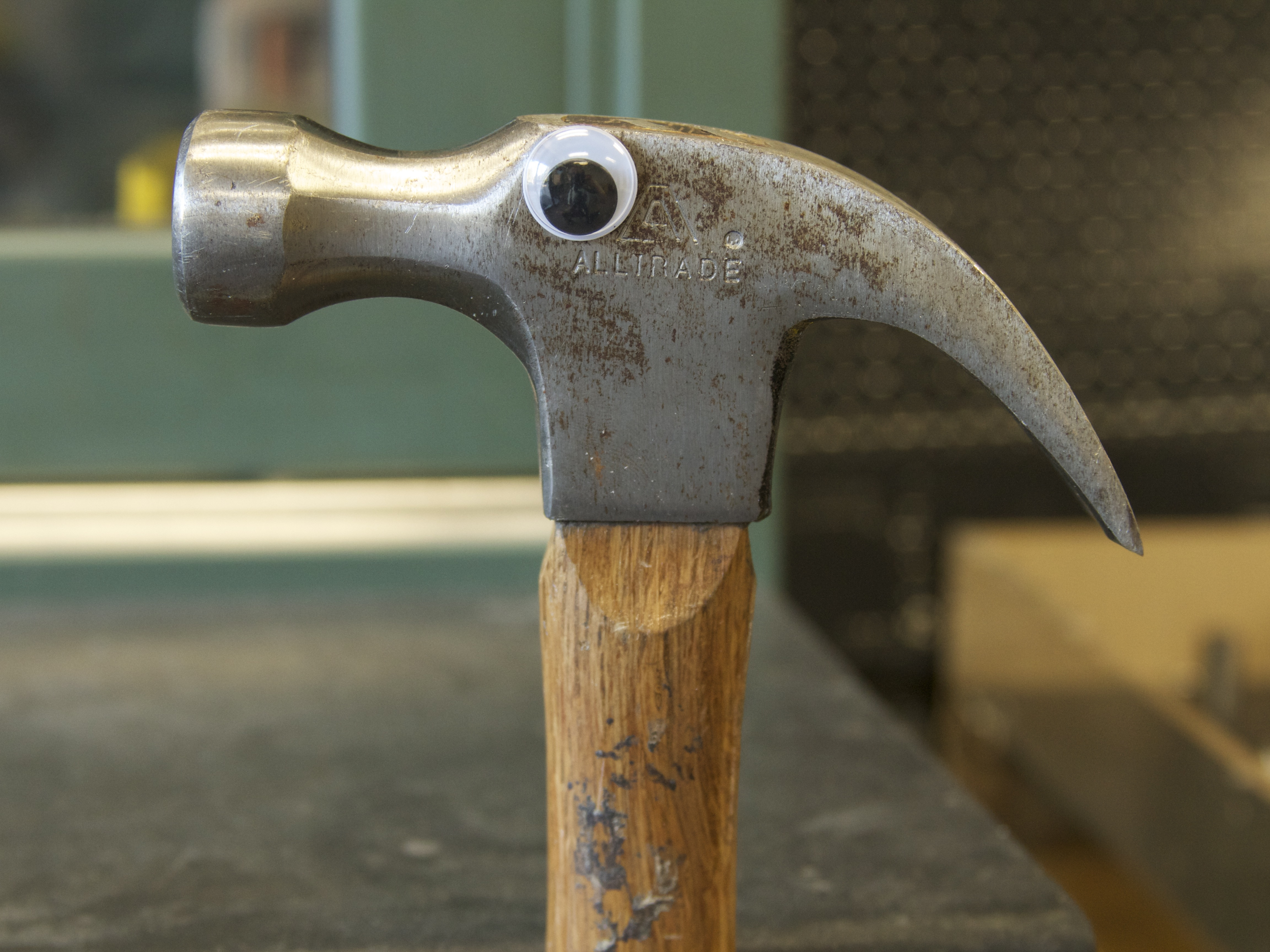
A googly eye attached to a hammer

The plastic shells come in a variety of sizes ranging from diameters of 3/16 inch (4.8 mm) to over 24 inches (610 mm). The inner disks come in a variety of colors including pink, blue, yellow, red and green. Googly eyes are used for a variety of arts and crafts projects including pipe cleaner animals, sock puppets, pranks, and other creations. Googly eyes may also be attached to inanimate objects in order to give the objects a "silly" or "cute" appearance. This use often personifies the objects for a humorous effect, or to make an object less threatening and more appealing.

== History ==
The name "googly eyes" may refer back to the early 20th century comic strip Barney Google and Snuffy Smith, in which Barney Google had characteristically exaggerated eyes that inspired a hit 1923 song "Barney Google (with the Goo-Goo-Googly Eyes)".

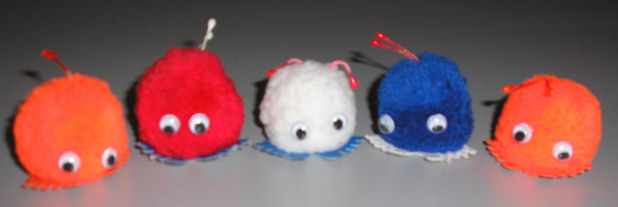
Five Weepuls in various colors

They were prominently used in the Weepul promotional toys, invented in the 1970s by Tom Blundell, an executive of the toy company BIPO, who stuck googly eyes to a small pom-pom out of boredom. The inventor claimed that 400 million were sold between 1971 and 2012. Similar toys have appeared since then, like the "Wuppies", a toy which was popular in the Netherlands in the 1980s, and the "Pirilampo Mágico" ("Magic Firefly"), a popular toy sold annually in Portugal since 1987 as a fundraising product for CERCI, a co-op specialized in helping the mentally disabled. Recent iterations of this toy have replaced its googly eyes and pom-pom appearance for one made fully in plastic.

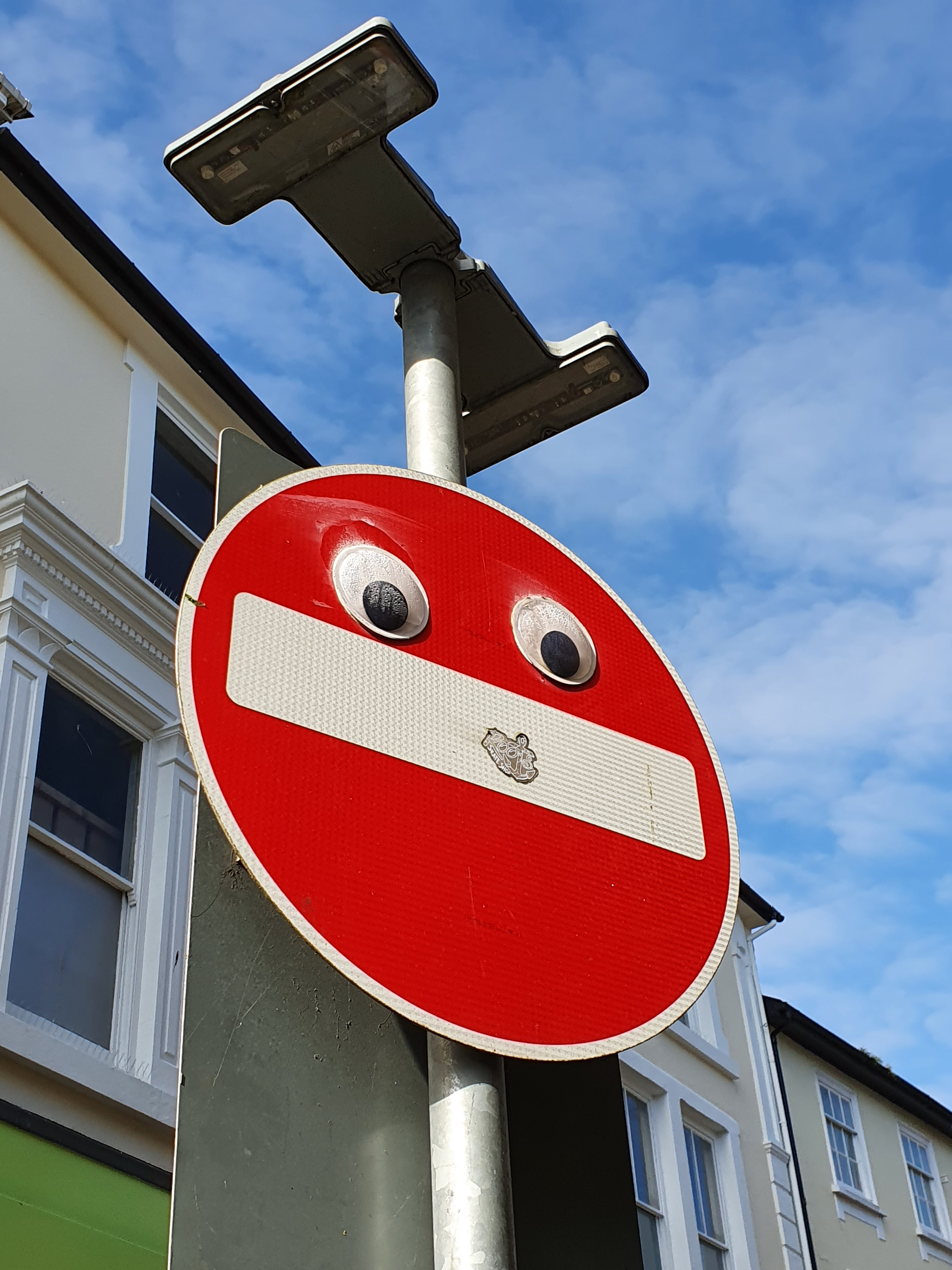
Googly eyes stuck to a no entry sign

Beginning in the 2000s, a trend called "eyebombing" emerged of sticking googly eyes to objects in the urban environment. The inspiration for the movement has been claimed by French artist Do Benracassa, in his 1980s project "Ça Vous Regarde". It was then developed by two unnamed Danish artists, and a group called the Googly Eyes Foundation emerged to spread the phenomenon.

The Guinness World Records recognises a pair of googly eyes measuring 12 feet (3.7 m) in diameter made in 2019 as the largest ever.

In 2024, a satirical protest seeking to add googly eyes to help ease riders due to the unreliability of the Massachusetts Bay Transportation Authority would lead to several trains having googly eye stickers affixed to them.

== In popular culture ==
In Sesame Street, Cookie Monster has googly eyes.

In a 2008 Saturday Night Live sketch, guest host Christopher Walken portrays a gardener who is afraid of plants. He puts googly eyes on the plants to make them less intimidating.

Googly eyes are featured in the 2022 film Everything Everywhere All at Once and its promotional materials.

== See also ==
- Gonk
- Googly-eyed doll
- OOglies
- Pareidolia, tendency to see faces in inanimate objects
- Squirmles
