= Googe =

Googe is a surname. Notable people with the surname include:

- Barnabe Googe (1540–1594), poet
- Debbie Googe (born 1962), bassist
