= Mariusz Gogol =

Polish footballer

Personal information
- Full name: Mariusz Gogol
- Date of birth: 28 July 1991 (age 35)
- Place of birth: Białystok, Poland
- Height: 1.81 m (5 ft 11 1/2 in)
- Position: Defender

Youth career
- Jagiellonia Białystok

Senior career*
Years	Team	Apps	(Gls)
2009–2012	Jagiellonia Białystok	1	(0)
2011	→ Ruch Wysokie Mazowieckie (loan)	9	(0)
2012	→ Chojniczanka Chojnice (loan)	11	(0)
2012–2017	Olimpia Zambrów	131	(9)
2017–2018	SV 07 Eschwege	43	(2)
2019	PFC Victoria London		

International career
	Poland U19	1	(0)
- * Club domestic league appearances and goals

Mariusz Gogol (born 28 July 1991) is a Polish former professional footballer who played as a defender.

== Career ==
=== Club ===
In February 2011, he was loaned to Ruch Wysokie Mazowieckie. In 2012, following his spell with Jagiellonia Białystok, Gogol signed for Olimpia Zambrów. In 2017, Gogol signed for German club SV 07 Eschwege. In January 2019, Gogol signed for PFC Victoria London, a club for the Polish diaspora in the United Kingdom.

=== International ===
He was a part of Poland national under-19 football team.

== Honours ==
Olimpia Zambrów

- III liga Podlaskie–Warmia-Masuria: 2012–13, 2014–15
