= Googly-eyed doll =

Doll of a type popular in the early 20th century

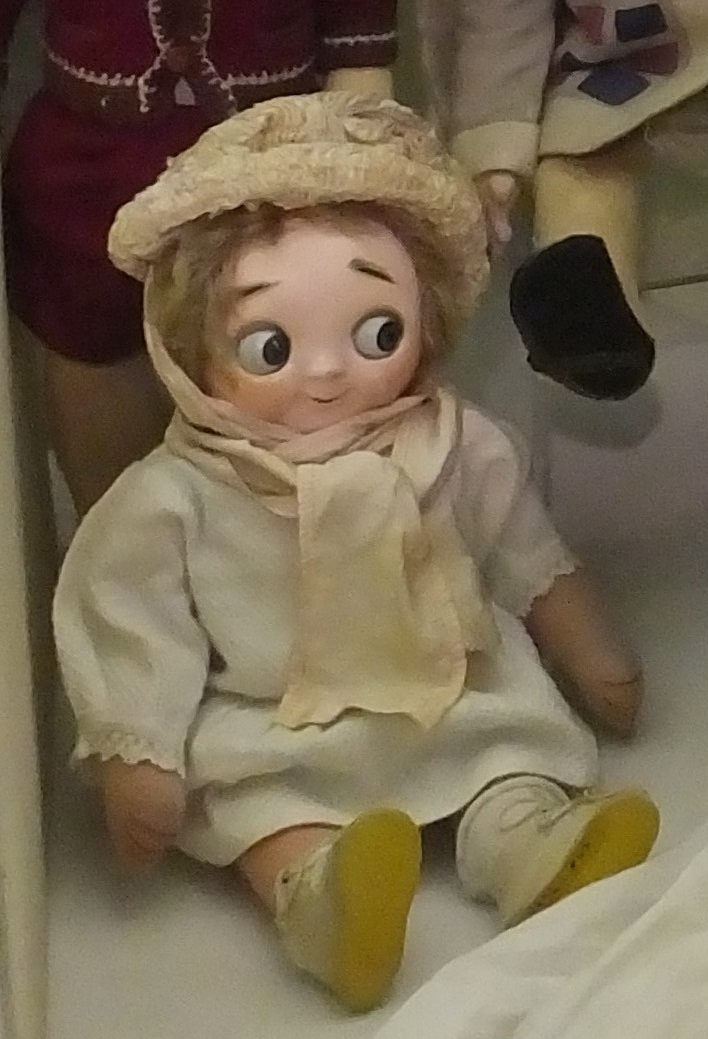
A googly-eyed doll

A googly-eyed doll or googly is a doll of a type popular in the early 20th century. The dolls featured large, bulging eyes, often looking off to one side. Their heads were made of bisque, with bodies made from cloth, papier-mâché, bisque, or a combination of materials.

Researchers have suggested that the term googly-eyed originated from the German Guck Augen, meaning "ogling eyes".

Googly-eyed dolls are considered collectible and may be valuable.

== See also ==
- Googly eyes
