= Gonk =

Furry creature toy

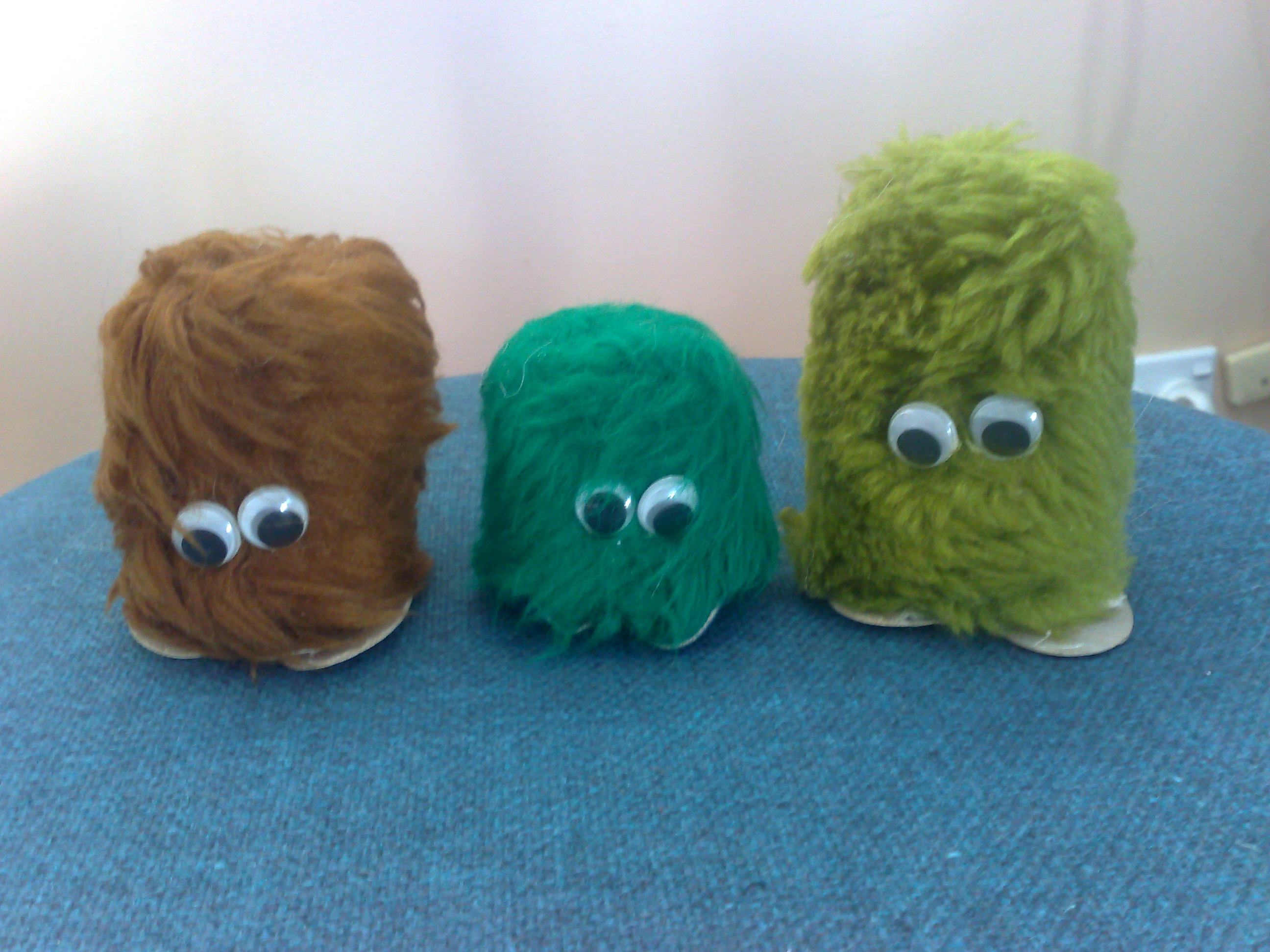
Gonks from a late-1970s Australian fairground event

Gonks are novelty toys and collectables originating from the United Kingdom in the 1960s. The Gonks' signature features include a small, spherical body, a furry texture and two googly eyes. Created by English inventor Robert Benson, the toys gained popularity and were owned by celebrities including Ringo Starr and Peter Sellers. Redesigned gonks (cylinders rather than spheres) were introduced into Australia in the 1970s.

== Description ==
The Gonks' signature features include a small, spherical body, a furry texture and two googly eyes. Some Gonks had outfits such as those of Merseybeat rockers and were marketed as collectibles.

== Reception ==
They were popular with children and their success was attributed to how they "can be made from almost any material and of any size". The appearance of some of these toys has been compared to the op art movement.

== History ==
Londoner Robert Benson invented the original toys that achieved popularity in the United Kingdom in the 1960s. They were owned by celebrities including Ringo Starr and Peter Sellers. The sale of the toys expanded to nations such as Canada and the United States, where Gund began to sell Gonks at a large scale, including inflatable vinyl versions.

Redesigned gonks (cylinders rather than spheres) were introduced into Australia by Tony Bell in the 1970s. They were sold in skill testers and fairgrounds across New South Wales and Queensland.

== In media ==
- Gonks are featured in the title sequence of Gonks Go Beat, a 1965 science-fiction film created by exploitation film director Robert Hartford-Davis.

== See also ==
- Squirmles
- Troll doll
- Weepul
