= Desiatina =

Archaic Russian land measurement

A desiatina, also known as desyatina, desiatin or desyatin (Russian: десятина), is a historical measure of area used in Russian Tsardom and Russian Empire for land measurement. A desiatina is equal to 2,400 square sazhens and is approximately equivalent to 2.702 English acres, 10,925 square metres, or 1.09 hectare.

== See also ==
- Historical Russian units of measurement
