= Ozyorsky District, Kaliningrad Oblast =

Ozyorsky District Озёрский район (Russian)
- District
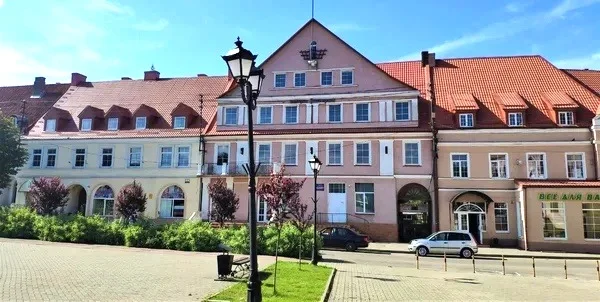
- Main square, Ozyorsk

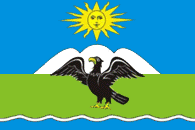
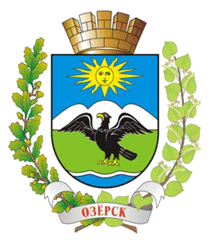
- Flag Coat of arms
- Location of Ozyorsky District in Kaliningrad Oblast
- Coordinates: 54°25′N 22°01′E
- Country: Russia
- Federal subject: Kaliningrad Oblast
- Established: 1947
- Administrative center: Ozyorsk

Area
  - Total: 877 km^{2} (339 sq mi)

Population (2010 Census)
  - Total: 15,316
  - Density: 17.5/km^{2} (45.2/sq mi)
  - Urban: 30.9%
  - Rural: 69.1%

Administrative structure
  - Administrative divisions: 1 Towns of district significance, 3 Rural okrugs
  - Inhabited localities: 1 cities/towns, 101 rural localities

Municipal structure
  - Municipally incorporated as: Ozyorsky Urban Okrug
- Time zone: UTC+2 (MSK–1)
- OKTMO ID: 27716000
- Website: http://ozyorsk.ru/

Ozyorsky District (Russian: Озёрский райо́н) is an administrative district (raion), one of the fifteen in Kaliningrad Oblast, Russia. It is located in the southeast of the oblast. The area of the district is 877 square kilometers (339 sq mi). Its administrative center is the town of Ozyorsk. Population: 15,316 (2010 census); 17,239 (2002 Census); 16,089 (1989 Soviet census). The population of Ozyorsk accounts for 30.9% of the district's total population.

== Geography ==
The district is situated in the southeast of the oblast, at the border with Poland. It is sparsely populated. The Angrapa River flows through the district. Forests and steppe pasture-land prevail.

== Administrative and municipal status ==
Within the framework of administrative divisions, Ozyorsky District is one of the fifteen in the oblast. The town of Ozyorsk serves as its administrative center.

As a municipal division, the district has been incorporated as Ozyorsky Urban Okrug since June 11, 2014. Prior to that date, the district was incorporated as Ozyorsky Municipal District, which was subdivided into one urban settlement and three rural settlements.

== Economy ==
District economy is agrarian. No major roads or railways pass through the district; bus lines carry most of the public transit.
