= Lietuvininkų prietelis =

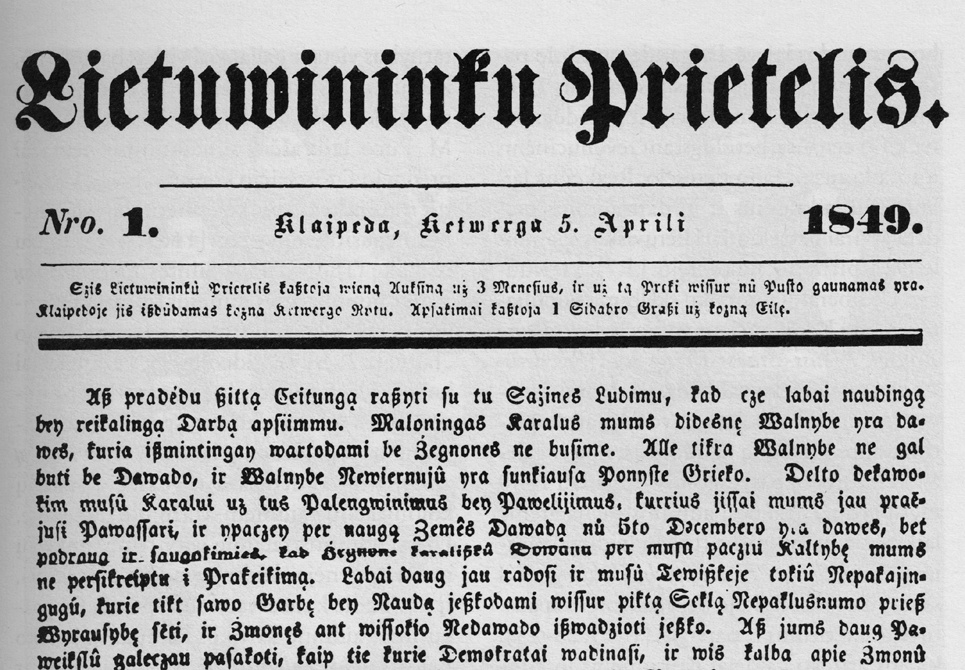
Portion of the first issue

Lietuvininkų prietelis (original spelling: Lietuwininku Prietelis; transl. Friend of Lietuvininkai) was a short-lived Lithuanian-language political newspaper published in Memel (now Klaipėda) by Lutheran priest Rudolf Andreas Zippel (Rudolfas Endrius Cipelis) in 1849. It was published for less than a year, but it is considered the first "true" Lithuanian periodical (earlier Nusidavimai Dievo karalystėje contained mostly translated religious texts). It was also the first Lithuanian periodical published in the territory of present-day Lithuania.

== History ==
During the German revolutions of 1848–1849, many activists tried to publish political proclamations and periodicals for Lithuanian-speaking Prussian Lithuanians. The first issue of Lietuvininkų prietelis was published on 5 April 1849 by publisher Friedrich Wilhelm Horch. It was edited by Rudolf Andreas Zippel (Rudolfas Endrius Cipelis), deacon of the Lithuanian parish in Memel. It was published weekly on Thursdays until 28 December 1849. In total, 38 issues were published.

The newspaper used Fraktur typeface and had four pages that measured 19.5 by 25.5 centimetres (7.7 in × 10.0 in). Its circulation probably did not exceed 200 copies. A full set of the newspaper issues was kept in the library of the University of Königsberg, but it was lost during World War II. Only in 1991 Lithuanian researcher Domas Kaunas discovered a copy of the first issue in the International Newspaper Museum in Aachen. What is known about content of the newspaper is known from this one issue. It started with a letter from the editor and devoted most of the content to European political news from Germany, Hungary, and the First Italian War of Independence. It described the proceedings of the Frankfurt Parliament and how Russia stationed 150,000 troops near the Prussian border. Little remaining space was devoted to local issues – commemoration of the first anniversary of the German revolutions, new constitutional rights, and the importance of education.

Zippel supported the German revolutions and the new Constitution of Prussia which guaranteed some freedoms. At the same time, he promised to print articles supporting Frederick William IV of Prussia. This is interpreted by Lithuanian researchers as Zippel's caution in post-revolutionary Prussia. The newspaper ceased publication when Zippel was assigned to Darkehmen (now Ozyorsk) much further south where there were very few Lithuanian-speaking residents. Lithuanian researchers believe that the reassignment was politically motivated to force the newspaper to close. Three months after the first issue of Lietuvininkų prietelis, a much more conservative Keleivis was published with government assistance by Friedrich Kurschat in Königsberg.
