= Keleivis =

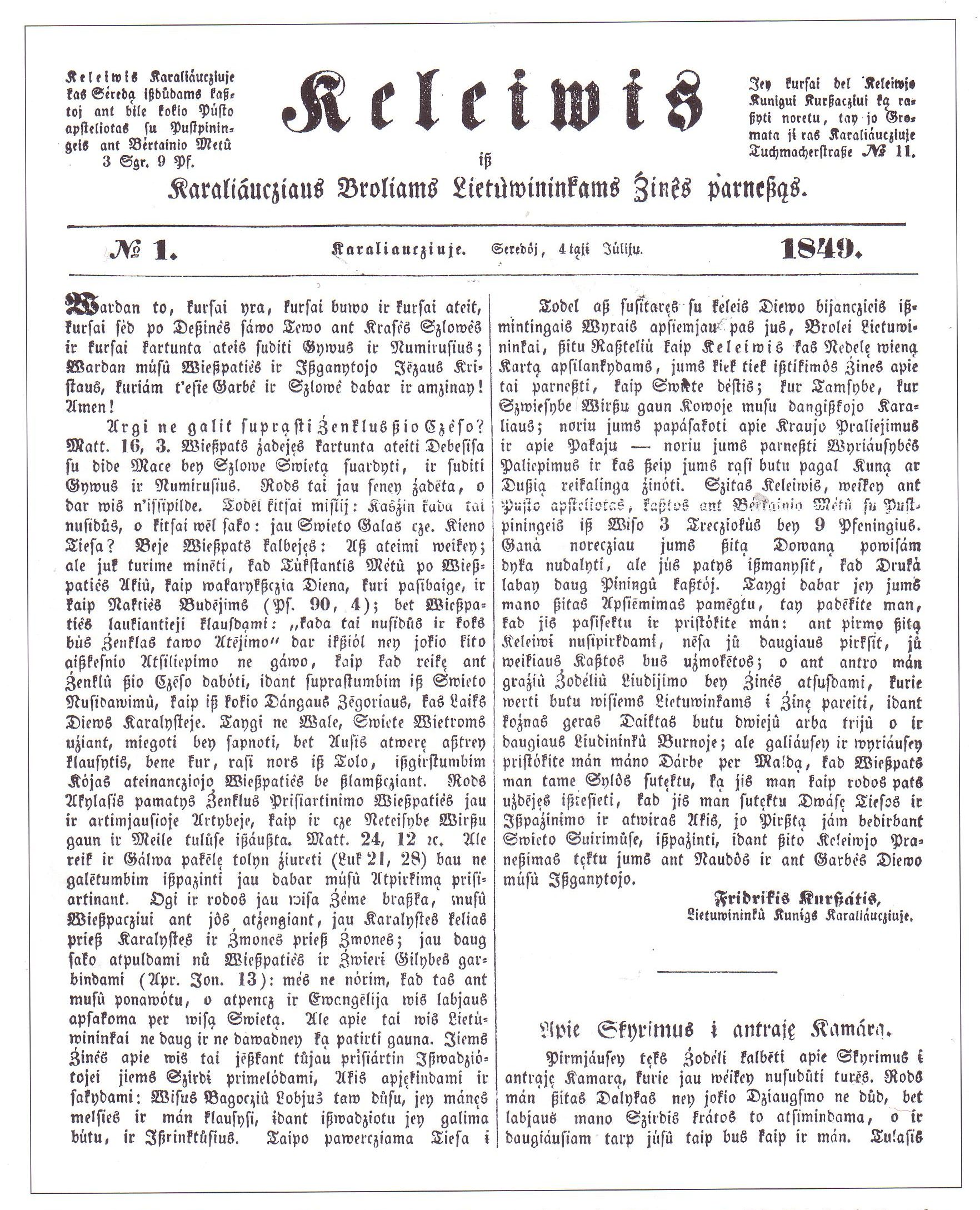
First issue of Keleivis in 1849

Keleivis iš Karaliaučiaus broliams Lietuvininkams žinias parnešas (original spelling: Keleiwis isz Karaliaucziaus Broliams Lietuwininkams Žines parnesząs, transl. Traveler from Königsberg Bringing News to Brothers Lithuanians) was a Lithuanian-language weekly periodical published in Königsberg, East Prussia, from 1849 to 1880. It was one of the first Lithuanian periodicals. Edited and published by the linguist and Lutheran pastor Friedrich Kurschat, Keleivis was politically conservative and propagated religious values.

== History ==
During the German revolutions of 1848–1849, liberals started publishing Lithuanian texts targeting Prussian Lithuanians. These included the short-lived periodicals Lietuviškas prielaiškas by teacher Mauras Pucas and Lietuvininkų prietelis by priest Rudolf Andreas Zippel. The Prussian Conservative Party approached Friedrich Kurschat, a native Lithuanian speaker and politically loyal to the German Empire, who published two pro-monarchy proclamations in 1848 and established weekly Keleivis in 1849. Kurschat received an annual subsidy of 450 marks from the government.

The first issue was published on 4 July 1849. The newspaper was published on Wednesdays and used Fraktur typeface. The newspaper was edited and mainly written by Kurschat. It published many religious texts and sermons, political and other news. From around 1851, its content became a little more varied. It started publishing more foreign news and occasional articles on agriculture, science, or technology. These were one of the first popular science texts in Lithuanian and required the creation of various neologisms for new technical terms. Some of these terms were adopted by Prussian Lithuanians and used until the early 20th century. Politically, the newspaper remained loyal to the German Empire and its emperors. It did not advocate against the Germanization of Prussian Lithuanians, did not support the Lithuanian National Revival, and instead attacked liberal and democratic ideas. Nevertheless, the newspaper is valued for its correct and fluent language and grammar.

The last issue of Keleivis was published on 30 March 1880. Kurschat transferred the newspaper to teacher Adomas Einaras who published Naujasis keleivis (The New Traveler) in Tilsit (now Sovetsk) in April 1880. In 1883, Naujasis keleivis was taken over by a new editor, who renamed it to Tilžės keleivis and published it until 1924. Einaras then briefly revived Keleivis, but in 1884 it became a weekly supplement to Konzervatyvų draugystės laiškas published by the Lithuanian Conservative Election Societies until 1918.
