= Rudolf Andreas Zippel =

Rudolf Andreas Zippel (Lithuanian: Rudolfas Andrius Cipelis; 1813–1894) was a Lutheran priest from East Prussia. He is best remembered as the editor of the first "true" Lithuanian periodical Lietuvininkų prietelis published in 1849.

== Biography ==
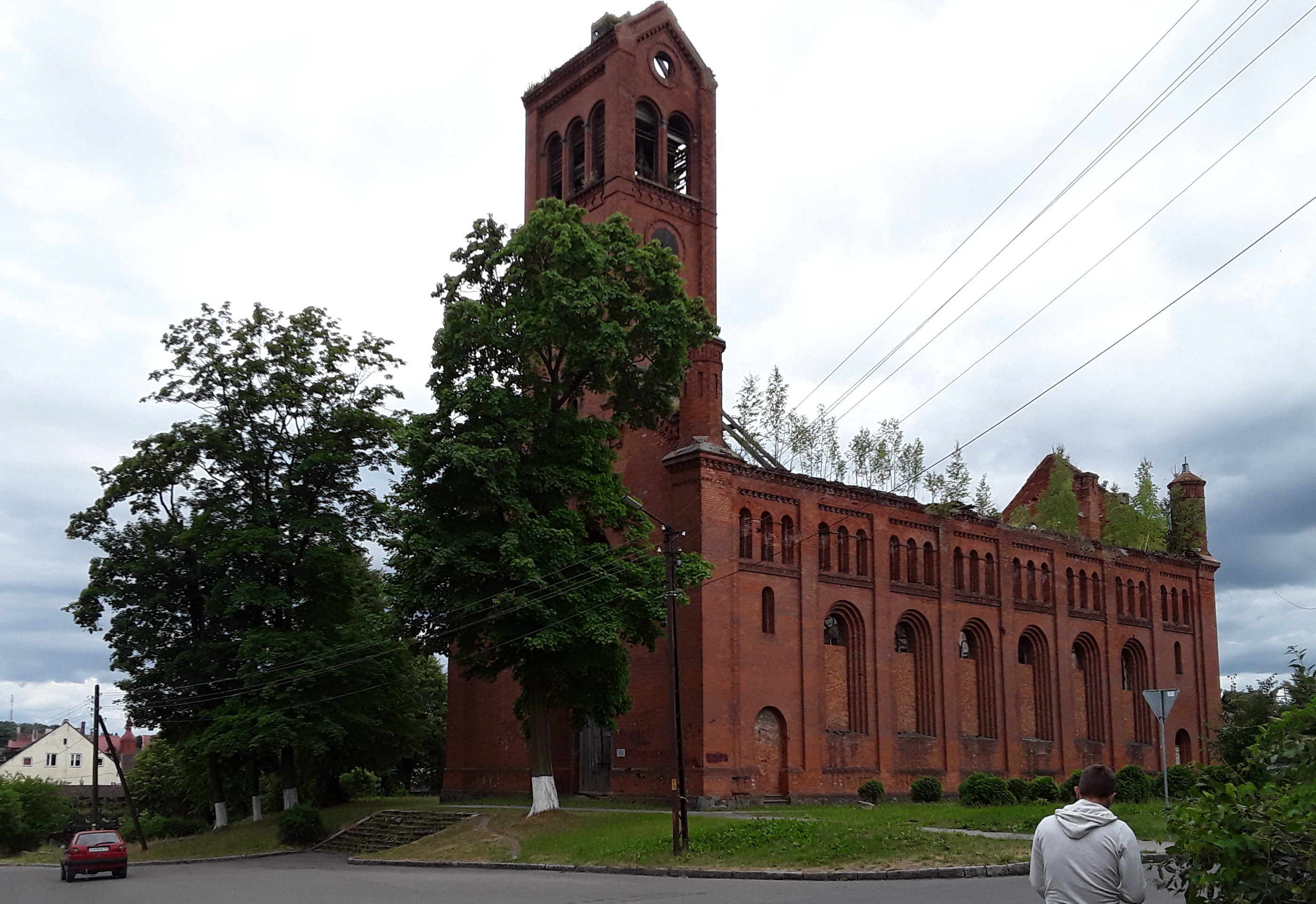
Ruins of the Lutheran church in Darkehmen (now Ozyorsk) where Zippel worked in 1849–1868

Zippel was born on 30 November 1813 to a family of Lutheran priest in Kallningken (now Kalininkai in Šilutė District Municipality). After graduating from the Tilsit Gymnasium in 1833, he enrolled into the University of Königsberg where, among other things, he studied the Lithuanian language in a seminar led by Ludwig Rhesa. After completing his theology studies, he was ordained as a priest on 16 May 1841.

Zippel was first assigned as adjunct priest to Deutsch Crottingen (Kretingalė). He married in February 1845, but their only daughter died at just nine months in September 1847. In 1846–1849, Zippel worked as the second priest of the Lithuanian parish in Memel (Klaipėda). During the German revolutions of 1848–1849, many activists published various political proclamations. On 5 April 1849, Zippel published the first issue of his Lithuanian-language weekly newspaper Lietuvininkų prietelis. It was a political newspaper which reported on European news. Its circulation was probably less than 200 copies. Zippel supported the revolutions and the new Constitution of Prussia which guaranteed some freedoms. The newspaper ceased publication in December 1849 when Zippel was assigned to Darkehmen (Ozyorsk) much further south where there were very few Lithuanian-speaking residents. Lithuanian researchers believe that the reassignment was politically motivated to force the newspaper to close.

He collected words and other lexicographical data for the Lithuanian dictionaries by linguists Georg Heinrich Ferdinand Nesselmann (published in 1850) and Friedrich Kurschat (published in 1870, 1874, and 1883). He also assisted Karl Leopold Friedrich Neiss with the preparation of a collection of religious sermons published in 1856. Zippel was promoted to superintendent in 1861.

Zippel worked as a priest in Darkehmen until 1868 when he retired from priestly duties due to a throat ailment. He then returned to present-day Lithuania and lived in Gropischken (Gropiškiai), Prökuls (Priekulė), and Drucken (Drukiai). He died in Drucken on 19 February 1894. He was buried near the Lutheran church of Prökuls which was destroyed by the Soviet authorities after World War II. Therefore, Zippel's grave has not survived.
