= List of Lithuanian-language periodicals (up to 1904) =

This list of Lithuanian-language periodicals includes periodical publications (newspapers, magazines) that were published up to 1904 when the Lithuanian press ban was lifted in Lithuania Proper (then part of the Russian Empire). The periodicals were printed mostly in Lithuania Minor (then part of East Prussia, German Empire) and by the Lithuanian Americans in the United States. Some publications published in Prussia were intended for Prussian Lithuanians, the local Lithuanian-speaking minority. Others were intended for Lithuanians in Russia and were smuggled by Lithuanian book smugglers across the Prussia–Russia border.

== Publications ==
The list is sorted in chronological order. The periodicals that lasted for five years or longer are highlighted with darker background. The publication dates, where known and available, are given in the ISO date format YYYY-MM-DD.

#	Title (modern spelling)	Translated title	Published in	Country	From	To	Short description
1	Nusidavimai Dievo karalystėje	News in the Kingdom of God	Königsberg (Kaliningrad)	German Empire	1823	1824/1825	A translation of German Königsberger Missionsblatt edited by Hermann Olshausen and published by the Evangelical Missionary Society of Königsberg. It reported on Evangelical missions to Asia and Africa.
2	Nusidavimai apie evangelijos prasiplatinimą tarp žydų ir pagonių	Stories about the Propagation of the Gospel among the Jews and the Pagans	Königsberg (Kaliningrad)	German Empire	1832	1914	Revival of Nusidavimai Dievo karalystėje. It mainly published translated texts from Königsberger Missionsblatt.
3	Lietuvininkų prietelis	The Friend of Lithuanians	Memel (Klaipėda)	German Empire	1849-04-05	1849-12-28	A Protestant weekly published and edited by priest Rudolf Andreas Zippel. In total, 38 issues were published (circulation 200 copies). They were four pages in length and mostly covered European news.
4	Keleivis	Traveler	Königsberg (Kaliningrad)	German Empire	1849-07-02	1880-02	A weekly newspaper edited by the linguist Friedrich Kurschat and sponsored by the German government. Kurschat sold the newspaper to Adomas Einoras who established Naujasis keleivis which was later replaced by Tilžės keleivis.
5	Lietuviškas prielaiškas	The Lithuanian Supplement	Tilsit (Sovetsk)	German Empire	1850-01	1850-03	Published by teacher Mauras Pucas as a supplement to the German liberal newspapers Dorfzeitung für Preußen and Die Freie Gemeinde. The publication ceased after seven issues when the German police confiscated the last issue. Pucas was forced to emigrate to the United States.
6	Paslas	Envoy		German Empire	1861	1862	A monthly religious newspaper reporting on the activities of the Gustav-Adolf-Werk.
7	Šilokarčiamos apsakymas	Report of Šilokarčiama	Heydekrug (Šilutė)	German Empire	1861-04-12	1862-03-31	A bilingual German–Lithuanian weekly (German: Heydekruger Anzeiger) until issue 31 when it became only a German newspaper.
8	Lietuviškas laiškas	Lithuanian Letter	Insterburg (Chernyakhovsk)	German Empire	1862	1862	A newspaper published by German democrats (editor F. Hagen) and aimed against the conservative Keleivis. Mykolas Biržiška believed that it was not a separate publication, but a different name of Lietuvininkų paslas.
9	Lietuvininkų paslas savo broliams šviežiausių naujienų pranešąs	The Lithuanian Envoy Bringing the Freshest News to His Brothers	Heydekrug (Šilutė)	German Empire	1863-02	1864	A weekly newspaper established by the German Progress Party in connection with the elections to the Landtag of Prussia. It was edited by Friedrich Wilhelm Siebert. In total, 97 or 98 issues were printed.
10	Žinia apie lenkų vainą su maskoliais	News About the Polish War with the Muscovites	Insterburg? (Chernyakhovsk)	German Empire	1864-02-01	1864-03-01	A bilingual Polish–Lithuanian newsletter of the rebels during the Uprising of 1863 (Polish: Wiadomości o naszej wojnie z Moskalami). Only two issues were published. The Lithuanian text was edited by Mikalojus Akelaitis.
11	Pasiuntinystės laiškelis arba bitelė ant pasiuntinystės lauko	Letter of the Mission or A Little Bee in the Missionary Field	Memel (Klaipėda)	German Empire	1875	1906	An irregular publication (frequency varied from twice a month to once a year) by the Lutherans. It was established by Johann Ferdinand Kelch and edited by Mikelis Kybelka (1877–1906). It was replaced by Pasiuntinystės knygelės in October 1907.
12	Kalvis melagis	Blacksmith the Liar	St. Petersburg	Russian Empire	1875-12-01	1876-03-01	A secret handwritten newspaper of Lithuanian students launched by Petras Vileišis. In total, about 10 issues were published.
13	Lietuviška ceitunga	The Lithuanian Newspaper	Memel (Klaipėda)	German Empire	1877	1940	A pro-German newspaper established by Martynas Šernius (Martin Szernus), who was its editor until 1905, and Heinrich Holz. The newspaper was published once a week, then bi-weekly (1900–1913), three times a week (1913–1932), and daily (1932–1940). In 1896–1900, it published 38 issues of supplement Laukininko pretelius. This supplement was replaced by ten issues of Lietuvos ūkininkas (The Farmer of Lithuania).
14	Ligonių prietelius	The Friend of the Ill	Königsberg (Kaliningrad)	German Empire	1879	1897	An annual medical publication first edited by Eduardas Gizevijus and later by members of the Lithuanian Literary Society. It was later published in Tilsit (Sovetsk).
15	Gazieta lietuviška	The Lithuanian Newspaper	New York, NY	United States	1879-08-16	1880-01	The first Lithuanian newspaper in the United States was established by Mykolas Tvarauskas. It was a Catholic newspaper that supported the traditions of the historical union between Poland and Lithuania. Between 12 and 16 issues were published. It had 132 subscribers. In 1891, Tvarauskas attempted to reestablish the newspaper as New Yorko gazieta lietuviška.
16	Tiesos prietelius	The Friend of Truth	Prökuls (Priekulė)	German Empire	1879/1880	1882-04-04	A Lutheran weekly newspaper edited and published by Jurgis Traušys. It published supplements Lekiantieji laiškai rytprūsiškos konservatyvų draugystės (1 February 1881 to 21 February 1882) and Pasiuntinystės nusidavimai. It was replaced by Konservatyvų draugystės laiškas.
17	Konzervatyvų draugystės laiškas	The Letter of the Conservative Society	Prökuls (Priekulė)	German Empire	1880	1918-11-19	Original spelling of the title: Konzerwatywu draugystēs laiszkas. It was published by the Lithuanian Conservative Election Societies weekly and from 1898 twice a week. In 1886–1918, it published a supplement Keleivis.
18	Naujasis keleivis	The New Traveler	Memel (Klaipėda)	German Empire	1880-03-28	1883-03-30	Established by Adomas Einoras, the weekly newspaper replaced Keleivis. It was replaced by Tilžės keleivis. The newspaper published 18 issues of supplement Gaspadorystės laiškas (The Farming Letter) in 1882.
19	Aušra	Dawn	Moscow	Russian Empire	1880-12-21	1881-01-22	A secret handwritten newspaper of Lithuanian students published using a hectograph. Four issues were published.
20	Pakajaus paslas	Envoy of Peace	Memel (Klaipėda)	German Empire	1881-04-02	1939	A bilingual German–Lithuanian publication by the Lutherans published in Memel (Klaipėda), Friedland (Pravdinsk), and Heydekrug (Šilutė). It was weekly until 1920.
21	Lietuva	Lithuania	Kaunas	Russian Empire	1883	1883	A handwritten newsletter edited by Adomas Jakštas while he was a student at the Kaunas Priest Seminary. In total, four issues appeared before it was forbidden by Antanas Baranauskas, rector of the seminary.
22	Tilžės keleivis	The Traveler of Tilsit	Tilsit (Sovetsk)	German Empire	1883	1924	A newspaper that replaced Naujasis keleivis. It was edited by Jurgis Arnašius (1893–1897, 1899–1924). In 1898–1911, it published a weekly supplement Keleivio draugas (The Friend of the Traveler).
23	Aušra	Dawn	Ragnit (Neman)	German Empire	1883-03	1886-06-22	The first monthly Lithuanian periodical aimed at the Lithuanians under the Russian rule. It was a key development in the Lithuanian National Revival. The first five issues were printed in Ragnit, others in Tilsit. In total, 40 issues were published in 29 physical booklets (two or three volumes were often combined into a single booklet).
24	Žinių nešėjas	Carrier of News	St. Petersburg	Russian Empire	1884	1885	A secret hectographed newsletter published by Lithuanian students Jonas Beržanskis, Rokas Šliūpas, Povilas Matulionis, Juozas Skrupskelis. In total, about 10 issues were published.
25	Lietuviškas politiškas laikraštis	Lithuanian Political Newspaper	Ragnit (Neman)	German Empire	1884-01	1886-12	A liberal political newspaper first published in Ragnit and later in Königsberg by Kristupas Kibelka. At the end of 1885, it was renamed to Žiūronas (Binoculars). In total, 140 issues were published.
26	Niamuno sargas	Guardian of the Neman	Ragnit (Neman)	German Empire	1884-09-26	1887-06-30	A weekly publication first published in Ragnit and then in Tilsit. It was printed in the Gothic script and published by Jurgis Mikšas, Julius Siebert, Ernestas Vejeris (Ernst Weyer). In total, 39 issues were published.
27	Unija	Union	New York, NY	United States	1884-10-26	1885-04-25	A newspaper established by Mykolas Tvarauskas and Jonas Šliūpas. Its name referenced the historical union between Poland and Lithuania. In total, 33 issues were published.
28	Lietuviškasis balsas	The Lithuanian Voice	New York, NY	United States	1885-07-02	1889-02	A newspaper published by Jonas Šliūpas in New York and Shenandoah, Pennsylvania. In total, 96 issues were published.
29	Vienybė lietuvninkų	The Unity of Lithuanians	Plymouth, PA	United States	1886-02	1920-01	A weekly newspaper first published in Plymouth and later in New York. Its editors and political orientation changed frequently, from conservative Catholicism to socialism. It was replaced by Vienybė published until 1985.
30	Garsas	The Sound	Tilsit (Sovetsk)	German Empire	1886-10-17	1887-08-20	A patriotic monthly newspaper that was supposed to replace the discontinued Aušra. It was published by Martynas Jankus. In total, 11 issues appeared.
31	Želmuo	The Shoot	Chicago, IL	United States	1887	1887	A liberal newspaper published by Jonas Grinius. Only four issues appeared.
32	Liuteronas	The Lutheran	Tilsit (Sovetsk)	German Empire	1887	1888	A religious newspaper published twice a week.
33	Šviesa	The Light	Tilsit (Sovetsk)	German Empire	1887-08	1890-08	A Catholic monthly newspaper.
34	Saulė	The Sun	Mahanoy City, PA	United States	1888	1959	A conservative weekly and later twice-weekly. It became a monthly in 1904. It was similar to a tabloid and used archaic language, spelling, and orthography. It published entertainment supplements Linksmi vakarai (The Fun Evenings; 1889–1890) and Linksma valanda (The Fun Hour, 1899–1910).
35	Varpas	The Bell	Tilsit (Sovetsk)	German Empire	1889-01	1905-12	A monthly newspaper of politics, literature, science first published in Tilsit and later in Ragnit. It was the major periodical of the Lithuanian National Revival.
36	Žemaičių ir Lietuvos apžvalga	Review of Samogitia and Lithuania	Tilsit (Sovetsk)	German Empire	1889-10	1896-12	A fiercely pro-Catholic and anti-Russian newspaper published every two weeks and later monthly. In total, 154 issues appeared.
37	Naujos žinios	The New News	Ragnit (Neman)	German Empire	1889-12-11	1890-03-26	A weekly newspaper published by Kristupas Voska in connection with an election campaign by the Lithuanian Conservative Election Societies. In total, 15 issues were published.
38	Kentėjimo gromata	The Letter of Suffering	Neuruppin	German Empire	1890	1890	A small religious publication.
39	Knapt		Sejny	Congress Poland	1890	1891	A secret handwritten newsletter published by Lithuanian clerics at the Sejny Priest Seminary. It was later renamed to Visko po biški (A Little of Everything) and Viltis (The Hope). It was organized and edited by Pranciškus Būčys.
40	Ūkininkas	The Farmer	Ragnit (Neman)	German Empire	1890-01	1905	A monthly newspaper geared towards farmers published by the editorial staff of Varpas in Ragnit and later Tilsit.
41	Nauja lietuviška ceitunga	The New Lithuanian Newspaper	Tilsit (Sovetsk)	German Empire	1890-11-29	1923	It was published twice a week (until 1910) and later three times a week. It was edited by Mikelis Kiošis. In 1896–1922, it published a weekly supplement Kaimynas (The Neighbor).
42	Tetutė	Auntie	Tilsit (Sovetsk)	German Empire	1891	1893	The first satirical newspaper in Lithuanian. It was published and edited by Martynas Jankus in Tilsit and Bittehnen. It appeared irregularly. In total, 13 issues were published.
43	Alyvų lapai iš žemės amžino pakajaus	The Olive Branch from the Eternal Peace of the World	Prökuls (Priekulė)	German Empire	1891-01-01	1893	A religious weekly that was briefly resurrected in 1926. In 1892, it changed its title to simply Alyvų lapai.
44	New Yorko gazeta lietuviška	Lithuanian Newspaper of New York	New York, NY	United States	1891-10-31	1892-05-07	It was a weekly newspaper edited by Mykolas Tvarauskas. In total, 25 issues were published.
45	Nauja aušra	The New Dawn	Tilsit (Sovetsk)	German Empire	1892-04	1892-04	A single issue was edited by Martynas Jankus. It was an attempt to revive Aušra.
46	Apšvieta	Enlightenment	Tilsit (Sovetsk)	German Empire	1892-06	1893	A monthly magazine of culture and literature published by the Lithuanian Scientific Society and edited by Jonas Šliūpas. In total, 15 issues were published.
47	Garsas	The Sound	Shenandoah, PA	United States	1892-10-13	1894-08-31	A liberal newspaper published by Tomas Astramskas. About 100 issues appeared. Due to financial difficulties, it was sold to a group of Lithuanian priests who established Garsas Amerikos lietuvių.
48	Lietuva	Lithuania	Chicago, IL	United States	1892-12-06	1920-05-08	It was a weekly (daily in 1918–1920) liberal-democratic newspaper. It was published by Antanas Olšauskas (1893–1917) and edited by Juozas Adomaitis-Šernas (1895–1917) and Bronius Kazys Balutis (1917–1919).
49	Palemonas	Palemon	Nemunėlio Radviliškis	Russian Empire	1893	1893	A small hectographed newsletter published by a group of Lithuanian book smugglers and edited by cleric Julijonas Paliukas. In total, three issues were published.
50	Valtis	The Boat	Plymouth, PA	United States	1894	1895	A Catholic weekly published and edited by Aleksandras Burba.
51	Nauja gadynė	The New Era	Mount Carmel, PA	United States	1894-01-23	1896-06-02	Established by Jonas Šliūpas, it was a newspaper of the freethinkers. Initially published in Mount Carmel, it later moved to Shenandoah, Pennsylvania, and Scranton, Pennsylvania, and was taken over by the Lithuanian Scientific Society. In total, 89 issues were published.
52	Lietuviškas darbininkas	The Lithuanian Worker	Bittehnen (Bitėnai)	German Empire	1894-06-01	1894-12-01	A liberal newspaper published every two weeks by Martynas Jankus. In total, 12 issues were published (circulation 500 copies).
53	Garsas Amerikos lietuvių	The Sound of Lithuanian Americans	Shenandoah, PA	United States	1894-10-02	1899-08-03	A Catholic newspaper established after a group of Lithuanian priests purchased Garsas. Established in Shenandoah, it was later published in Minersville (1898) and Elizabeth (1898–1899). Its editors included Antanas Milukas. In total, about 190 issues appeared. In 1897–1898, the newspaper published 11 issues of supplement Lietuviškas kningynas (The Lithuanian Library) which encouraged the establishment of Lithuanian libraries and bookstores. At the same time, it also published supplement Pasaulė (The World) which republished material from newspapers.
54	Perkūnas	The Thunder	Shenandoah, PA	United States	1895	1895	A satirical and humorous newspaper published by Antanas Astramskas.
55	Bostono lietuviškas laikraštis	The Lithuanian Newspaper of Boston	Boston, MA	United States	1895-11-01	1895-12-27	A newspaper edited and mainly written by priest Juozapas Žebrys who purchased it, moved it to Waterbury, Connecticut, and established weekly Rytas. In total, seven issues were published.
56	Siberija	The Siberia	Brooklyn, NY	United States	1896	1896	A weekly newspaper published by Mykolas Tvarauskas.
57	Kardas	The Sword	Baltimore, MD	United States	1896	1898	A weekly published by Lithuanian freethinkers. In total, 131 issues appeared. In 1898, it published a monthly supplement Galybė (The Might).
58	Tėvynė	The Homeland	Plymouth, PA	United States	1896	present	A newspaper published in Plymouth, PA (1896–1899, monthly), Pittston, Pennsylvania (1900–1901, weekly), South Boston (1908), New York (1908–2001), Chicago (since 2006). It was not published in 1902–1907 and 2001–2006. It is published by the Lithuanian Alliance of America (Lithuanian: Susivienijimas lietuvių Amerikoje or SLA).
59	Tėvynės sargas	The Guardian of the Homeland	Tilsit (Sovetsk)	German Empire	1896-01	1904-05	A catholic monthly newspaper edited by Juozas Tumas-Vaižgantas and Antanas Milukas.
60	Rytas	The Morning	Waterbury, CT	United States	1896-02-17	1898-11-23	A weekly newspaper established by priest Juozas Žebrys. When he left the parish, Petras Saurusaitis took over Rytas but quickly discontinued it and replaced it with Bažnyčios tarnas. In total, 46 issues were published.
61	Lietuvos paslas	The Lithuanian Envoy	Tilsit (Sovetsk)	German Empire	1896-04-01	1898-12-31	A weekly newspaper published and edited by the linguist Friedrich Kurschat. from October 1897, it was published every two weeks.
62	Lietuvos darbininkas	The Worker of Lithuania	Zürich	Switzerland	1896-05-01	1899	The first periodical of the Social Democratic Party of Lithuania. It was published in Lithuanian and Polish (Robotnik litewski). Three issues were published: first in Zürich, second in Tilsit, and third in Bittehnen.
63	Pensilvanijos darbininkas	The Worker of Pennsylvania	Shenandoah, PA	United States	1896-08	1898	A socialist weekly newspaper known as Darbininkas (The Worker) from 1897. It was published and edited by Robertas Kuncmanas and Antanas Lalis.
64	Aušra	The Dawn	Tilsit (Sovetsk)	German Empire	1896-10-22	1899-10-03	First published as the weekly Lietuviškasis laiškas (The Lithuanian Letter), it was renamed to Aušra published every two weeks in 1897. It was published and edited by Enzys Jagomastas. In total, 255 or 258 issues appeared. In 1889–1890, it published 25 issues of the supplement Namų prietelis (The Friend of the Home) which printed many literary works of Lithuanian writers.
65	Amerikos lietuvis	The Lithuanian American	Chicago, IL	United States	1897	1897	A weekly socialist newspaper that was edited by Jonas Grinius and Juozas Laukis. Only three issues were published.
66	Baltasis erelis	The White Eagle	Gipkeliai	Russian Empire	1897	1912	A newspaper written and published by book smuggler Jurgis Bielinis. In total, three issues were published in 1897, 1911, and 1912. In 1897, Bielinis obtained a hand-powered printing press and published the only Lithuanian newspaper printed inside the Russian Empire.
67	Vardas kataliko	The Name of a Catholic	Lapšiai	Russian Empire	1897-10	1900	A handwritten newsletter for the youth published by Petras Tumasonis.
68	Skyrimo ceitunga Klaipėdos bei Šilokarčiamos kreizams	Newspaper for the Klaipėda and Šilokarčiama Districts	Memel (Klaipėda)	German Empire	1898	1898	Three issues of an electoral publication by the German progressive parties.
69	Dirva	The Soil	Shenandoah, PA	United States	1898	1906	A quarterly cultural magazine edited by Antanas Milukas. In Lithuania, it was merged with Žinyčia, but continued to be printed as Dirva in the United States. In total, 44 issues were published.
70	Nauja draugija	The New Society	Baltimore, MD	United States	1898-10-19	1899-05-19	It supported socialist, anarchist, and freethought ideas. It lasted for 19 issues.
71	Bažnyčios tarnas	The Servant of the Church	Waterbury, CT	United States	1898-12	1904	A newspaper published by priest Petras Saurusaitis instead of Rytas. It was a Catholic newspaper advocating teetotalism. Initially named Tarnas bažnyčios, it was renamed Bažnyčios tarnas in 1899 and published weekly. In 1901, it became a monthly.
72	Aidas Lietuvos darbininkų gyvenimo	The Echo of the Lives of Lithuanian Workers	Bittehnen (Bitėnai)	German Empire	1899	1899	Publication by the Social Democratic Party of Lithuania. The first issue was translated from Polish by Kazys Grinius. Only three issues appeared.
73	Viltis	The Hope	Shenandoah, PA	United States	1899	1901	A liberal workers' newspaper edited by Antanas Kaupas, Tomas Astramskas, Jonas Montvila, Vincas Šlekys (Stagaras).
74	Katalikas	The Catholic	Chicago, IL	United States	1899-01	1917-04	A Catholic weekly (a daily in 1914–1916). It was edited by Petras Tumasonis-Brandukas in 1903–1910. Its editorial office published about a hundred Lithuanian books and musical works.
75	Vaidelytė	Vaidilutė	Glasgow	United Kingdom	1899-08-25	1899-11-17	A Catholic newspaper published every two weeks by Jonas Montvila ir Vincas Varnagiris.
76	Žiburys	The Beacon	Saint Petersburg	Russian Empire	1900	1900	A secret hectographed newsletter published by Kazimieras Būga and Povilas Paškonis. In total, two issues appeared.
77	Žinyčia	The Treasury of Knowledge	Tilsit (Sovetsk)	German Empire	1900	1904	A cultural magazine established by Juozas Tumas-Vaižgantas. After five issues, it was merged with Dirva published in the United States. Eight issues of the merged magazine Dirva-Žinynas were published.
78	Saulėtaka	The Sunset	Bittehnen (Bitėnai)	German Empire	1900-01-01	1902-01-15	A monthly literary and political magazine published by Martynas Jankus. In total, 18 issues were printed.
79	Kūrėjas	The Creator	Chicago, IL	United States	1900-02-07	1900-06-14	A weekly that supported freethought and anarchist ideas. About 20 issues were published by Domininkas Keliauninkas (pen name Juozas Laukis).
80	Lietuvos sargas	The Guardian of Lithuania	London	United Kingdom	1900-07-08	1900	A pro-Russian newspaper published by Kazimieras Pilėnas in competition with priest Boleslovas Šlamas. Only one or two issues were published.
81	Ateitis	The Future	Pittsburgh, PA	United States	1900-09	1901-05	A socialist and freethought newspaper edited by Domininkas Keliauninkas (J. Laukis) and Antanas Lalis.
82	Šv. Kazimiero pasiuntinys	The Envoy of Saint Casimir	Pittsburgh, PA	United States	1901	1901	A monthly Catholic newspaper.
83	Griausmas	Thunder	Philadelphia, PA	United States	1901	1907	It was edited by J. G. Baronas and published with interruptions.
84	Ataskaita	The Report		United States	1901	1910	An official publication of the Lithuanian Alliance of America. In total, 32 issues were published.
85	Žvaigždė	The Star	New York, NY	United States	1901	1944	A Catholic newspaper published in New York (1901–1903), Shenandoah, Pennsylvania (1904–1909), and Philadelphia (1909–1944). It was published weekly (until 1923), monthly (1923–1926), and later quarterly. It was edited and published by Antanas Milukas (1903–1942) and Julė Pranaitytė (1943–1944).
86	Naujienos	The News	Tilsit (Sovetsk)	German Empire	1901-01	1903-12	A liberal monthly newspaper published by the editorial staff of Varpas.
87	Lietuvis	The Lithuanian	Philadelphia, PA	United States	1901-03	1901-09	A liberal weekly newspaper edited by Vincas Daukšys. In total, 25 issues were published.
88	Darbininkų balsas	The Voice of Workers	Tilsit (Sovetsk)	German Empire	1901-07	1906-04	A newspaper of the Social Democratic Party of Lithuania published in Tilsit and later Bittehnen. Edited by Augustinas Janulaitis, it was published every two months and monthly in 1905. In total, 36 issues appeared.
89	Darbininkas	The Worker	Chicago, IL	United States	1902	1903	A socialist magazine edited by Domininkas Keliauninkas and Antanas Lalis. Only two issues appeared.
90	Biuletenis mielaširdystės darbo gelbėti dūšias apleistas čyščiuje	A Bulletin of the Compassionate Work to Save Souls Abandoned in Misery	La Chapelle-Montligeon	France	1903	1903	A bulletin translated by Julija Pranaitytė.
91	Smarkininko krykštavimas	Cheers of a Hothead	Tilsit (Sovetsk)	German Empire	1903	1903	A small newspaper devoted to an anti-alcohol campaign.
92	Iš gyvaties versmės	From the Fountain of Life	Tilsit (Sovetsk)	German Empire	1903	1904	A religious publication. In total, 11 issues were published.
93	Juonuomenės draugas	The Friend of the Youth	Sejny	Congress Poland	1903	1908	A secret handwritten newsletter published by Lithuanian clerics at the Sejny Priest Seminary.
94	Darbininkų viltis	The Hope of Workers	Shenandoah, PA	United States	1903	1925	A liberal newspaper published by Vincas Šlekys, Jurgis Gegužis, and others.
95	Kryžius	The Cross	Tilsit (Sovetsk)	German Empire	1903-01	1904	A Catholic monthly newspaper edited by priest J. Jasienskis.
96	Pasiuntinybės laiškas	Letter of the Mission	Tilsit (Sovetsk)	German Empire	1903-10	1910-03	A newspaper of Lithuanian Baptists printed by Martynas Jankus and edited by Dovas Kalvaitis. In total, 40 issues were published.
97	Aušros žvaigždės spinduliai	The Rays of the Dawn Star	Memel (Klaipėda)	German Empire	1903-12-05	1904-12-24	A serialized publication of sermons by priest Jonas Pipiras.
98	Spindulys	The Ray	Brooklyn, NY	United States	1904	1907	A liberal weekly edited by Vincas Karalius.
99	Pasiuntinybės prietelis	Friend of the Mission	Tilsit (Sovetsk)	German Empire	1904	1908	A quarterly publication of the Lutherans. Its circulation reached 5,000 copies.
100	Pagalba	Help	Tilsit (Sovetsk)	German Empire	1904	1939	A monthly newspaper published by the Lutherans. After the Klaipėda Revolt in 1923, it was published in the Klaipėda Region. Its editors included Vilius Gaigalaitis (Wilhelm Gaigalat) and Martynas Purvinas.
101	Draugas	The Friend	Bittehnen (Bitėnai)	German Empire	1904-04	1906-04	A socialist publication edited by Vincas Kapsukas and published in Bittehnen and Tilsit. After four issues, it was replaced by Darbininkas (The Worker) of which nine issues appeared.
102	Lietuvių laikraštis	Newspaper of Lithuanians	Saint Petersburg	Russian Empire	1904-12-01	1906-01-19	The first legal Lithuanian periodical in the Russian Empire after the Lithuanian press ban was lifted in April 1904.
103	Vilniaus žinios	The News of Vilnius	Vilnius	Russian Empire	1904-12-10	1909-03-04	The first legal Lithuanian daily in the Russian Empire after the Lithuanian press ban was lifted in April 1904.

== Bibliography ==
- Jonaitis, Marius (2011). "Vienybės lietuvininkų" istorija (1886–1920 m.) (Master's thesis) (in Lithuanian). Vytautas Magnus University.
- Kaunas, Domas (1996). Mažosios Lietuvos knyga: lietuviškos knygos raida 1547-1940. Mažosios Lietuvos fondo leidiniai (in Lithuanian). Vol. 6. Baltos lankos. ISBN 9986-813-28-X.
- Krapauskas, Virgil (2000). Nationalism and Historiography: The Case of Nineteenth-Century Lithuanian Historicism. New York: Columbia University Press. ISBN 0-88033-457-6.
- "Tėvynė : literatūros mokslo ir politikos mėnesinis laikrasztis : organas "Susiv. lietuvių Amerikoje" / redaktorius Jonas Žilinskas". Lietuvos integrali bibliotekų informacijos sistema (in Lithuanian). Lietuvos nacionalinė Martyno Mažvydo biblioteka.
- Surblys, Alvydas; Zakaravičiūtė, Agnė; Rudminaitė, Edita (4 October 2016). ""Lietuvių laikraštis" – pirmas legalus periodinis leidinys po spaudos draudimo" (in Lithuanian). Kauno apskrities viešoji biblioteka.
- Stepukonienė, Inga (2014). "Daktaras Rokas Šliūpas – lietuvybės puoselėtojas". Žiemgala (in Lithuanian). 2. ISSN 1392-3781.
- Tamošiūnas, Julius (1991). Lietuviškų periodinių leidinių bibliografija 1832–1982 (in Lithuanian). Kaunas: Julius Tamošiūnas. OCLC 35388671.
- Tapinas, Laimonas; et al., eds. (1997). Žurnalistikos enciklopedija (PDF) (in Lithuanian). Vilnius: Pradai. ISBN 9986-776-62-7.
- Toliušis, Šarūnas (2018). Mažosios Lietuvos periodinė spauda 1811–1939 (in Lithuanian). Klaipėda: Mėmelio istorija. ISBN 978-609-8180-32-9.
