= Lithuanian accentuation =

Accent in Lithuanian phonology

In Lithuanian phonology, stressed heavy syllables are pronounced in one of two prosodically distinct ways. One way is known as the acute or falling accent: this may be described as "sudden, sharp or rough". In Lithuanian it is called tvirtaprãdė pri̇́egaidė, literally 'firm-start accent'. The second way is known as the circumflex or rising accent, which may be described as "continued, mild or smooth". In Lithuanian it is called tvirtagãlė pri̇́egaidė, literally 'firm-end accent'. Light (i.e. short) syllables may be stressed or unstressed, but cannot be differentiated by accent.

In written Lithuanian, various diacritic marks (acute ⟨´⟩, tilde ⟨˜⟩, and grave ⟨`⟩) are used to mark the tonal accent and stress.

== Syllable weight ==
In Lithuanian, heavy (i.e. long) syllables include those containing:

- long vowels (monophthongs)
- diphthongs (/aw aj ɛj uj/) which end in a glide (/j/ or /w/)
- closed syllables ending in sonorants (/l m n r/)
- complex monophthongs (/ie/ and /uo/) behaving as a phonemic unit

Heavy syllables can be either stressed or unstressed.

In mixed acute diphthongs beginning with /i/ or /u/, the acute mark is replaced by a grave; this reflects the fact that, in the standard language (but not in some dialects), the first part of the diphthong is short. In complex diphthongs, the acute accent is marked by an acute ⟨´⟩ diacritic over the first letter and the circumflex by a tilde ⟨˜⟩ over the second letter. This indicates a perception that the letter is stronger in some way. For example, a higher pitch or a longer or louder sound, depending on the dialect and speaker. Stressed short vowels are marked by a grave diacritic ⟨`⟩.

== Stress ==
Stress is free and can occur on any syllable of the word. However, it rarely occurs more than four syllables before the end of the word. Some nouns and adjectives have fixed stress, that is, an accent remains on the same stem syllable in all the inflections. Other nouns and adjectives have mobile stress where the accent moves from place to place, particularly between stem and ending. In each declension of the noun or adjective, there are four accent classes, one fixed and three mobile, all with different patterns of movement.

Stress is a complex of various acoustic features, particularly loudness (strength and intensity). Other features such as duration, spectrum and pitch, are of lesser importance in normal speech.

The frequency of syllables stressed at various positions from the ends of words varies: the last syllable is stressed 28.67% of the time; the second last, 53.22% of the time (most commonly); the third last, 16.10%, the fourth last, 1.86% and the fifth last, 0.15% (least commonly)., which means that despite the apparent freedom of accentuation, more than 97% of words are in fact stressed on one of the last three syllables. The most distant syllable that can be stressed is the sixth.

Nouns stressed in this way are declined in the same manner as other polysyllabic nouns. For example,

- pageležinkelė̃ meaning "place along the railway" and pãgeležinkelei meaning, "in the place along the railway" (geleži̇̀nkelis meaning "railway", from geleži̇̀s meaning "iron" and kẽlias meaning "road")

Polysyllabic compound words and prefixed words, usually have one or sometimes two secondary (or weaker) stresses. The further the secondary stress is from the main stress, the stronger it is. For example,

- sep'tynias-dešim̃tas, "the seventieth";
- pasigerv-uogiáudamas, "when picking blackberries for oneself" (masculine singular),
- pasigerv-uogiáuti, "to pick blackberries for oneself for some wanted period of time"
- pagerv-uogiáuti, "to pick blackberries for some time" (perfective verb - in the present tense the meaning is abstract)
- gerv-uogiáuti, "to pick blackberries" (imperfective), (gérvuogė meaning blackberry from gérvė meaning "crane" and úoga meaning "berry").

In international words, which consist of three poorly inter-flowing parts, two secondary stresses may occur. For example,

- 'mikro/"foto/grãfija 1, "microphotograph"
- 'mili/"amper/mètras 2, "milliampere meter"
- 'hidro/a"ero/dròmas 2, "seadrome".

Long syllables, that is, those containing a long vowel, a diphthong, or a mixed diphthong which ends in a sonorant, may have one of two types of accents: the acute or the circumflex. In an unstressed position, the opposition of the two accents is neutralized and reflected by a circumflex accent.

In dialects, there are cases when words may be differentiated only by the use of accents on unstressed syllables. One example is where an accent determines the declensional case,

- statýtám sg. dat., statýtam̃ sg. loc. This sg. loc. is a shorter form of statýtame.
- statýtas, meaning "built", the past participle (masculine sg. nom.) of statýti, meaning "to build (something)".

In standard language, such a difference would not be emphasized. The m might have an increased emphasis in the case of an ending -e drop in sg. locative.

== Syllable nucleus ==
Mixed and simple diphthongs are present only when they are followed by consonants or when they occur at the end of a word. When they are followed by a vowel, the diphthong is split into two syllables. For instance,

- gul̃-ti (infinitive), gù-la (third person present) and, gù-lė (third person past) (meaning "to lie on or in")
- kél-ti, kẽ-lia, kė́-lė ("to raise")
- gui-ti, gu-ja, gu-jo ("to harass or banish").

Diphthongs are distinguished from monophthongs (simple vowels) by the fact that they do not have short equivalents. Complex diphthongs differ from the others in that the second component is a vowel rather than a consonant, that is, a semivowel or sonorant, and they do not split into two syllables. For example,

- pri̇́eangis: the prefix is prie, not pri-e
- núoara: the prefix is núo, not nú-o.

Complex diphthongs also differ from monophthongs in that their rise is variable; they are longer than long vowels and, in comparison to au, ai, ei, an accent does not lengthen their parts.

When foreign words are adopted, and there are simple (eu, oi, ou) or mixed diphthongs (o or e with l, m, n, or r); the sounds of the o and the e are not lengthened. One exception is the mixed diphthong or which is found in old, nativized foreign words like morkà "carrot" and, gõrčius "measure of about three litres". In this case, the o is long and marked by a circumflex when stressed or written ò when short. (Both variants are used).

Mixed diphthongs with long vowels can be found in compound words. For example,

- dvárponis
- kérplėša
- žẽmuogė (žẽmė meaning "earth" and úoga meaning "berry").

These can be compared to other mixed diphthongs where the long vowel is not present such as:

- keliõnmaišis, "a hold-all or haversack" (keliõnė meaning "trip" and mai̇̃šas meaning "bag")
- alkū́nkaulis, "the ulnar bone" (alkū́nė meaning "elbow" and káulas meaning "bone").

== Differentiating between tone patterns ==
Heavy syllables and diphthongs (simple, complex or mixed) may have two accents. The presence of minimal pairs, indicates the role of the two accentual patterns. For example,

- áukštas [ˈâʊ̯kʃtɐs] "tall" vs. aũkštas [ˈɒ̌ʊ̯ˑkʃtɐs] "storey"
- káltas "chisel"; kal̃tas "guilty"
- kóšė "(he, she or they) filtered, was/were filtering"; kõšė "porridge"
- rūgšti̇̀s (sg. acc., rū́gštį) "acid", rū̃gštis (sg. acc. rū̃gštį) "sourness"
- sū́ris "cheese"; sū̃ris "saltiness"
- táipinti "to type" (borrowing from the English); tai̇̃pinti* "to say 'yes' many times about something"

An accent represents a complex of acoustic features such as, sound quality (timbre), quantity, strength (intensity), fundamental frequency (pitch), and degree of pitch separation. These features may be varied in order to produce dialect and in order to differentiate between two accents when they are present.

The differentiation between two accents present in monophthongs and complex diphthongs is clearest in the Samogitian dialect. It is less so in western Aukštaitian and more assimilated in the eastern and southern Aukštaitian dialects. In the standard language, accents in monophthongs differ with longer circumflex vowels both in diapason (tonal grouping) and intensity. In practice, however, these distinctions are minor. Similarly, in complex diphthongs (ie and uo), and mixed diphthongs beginning with i and u, the first element of these diphthongs does not lengthen when stressed. On the other hand, simple and mixed diphthongs starting in a and e are clearly differentiated in the standard language. The first part of the diphthong becomes longer and more tense under the acute accent. In eastern and southern Aukštaitian, diphthongs starting in i and u lengthen similarly to those in a and e, and thus the accents can be easily differentiated.

In the Samogitian and western Aukštaitian dialects, variation of pitch and tone is an important way to differentiate accents. For instance, accents may differ in where they appear in time relative to the peak of the pitch and the peak of the diapason. In particular, the acute accent, when depicted as a graph, has a curve with pitch similar to the circumflex, but more sudden. The rise lasts for a shorter time and falls more rapidly. It starts when the pitch is higher and then, after a slight and quick rise, it falls. In comparison, the circumflex accent, when depicted as a graph, has a curve in which the rise lasts longer and falls less rapidly. It begins when the pitch is a little lower than that of the acute, rises slightly to a peak that is later than the acute and then falls at a similar rate but to a lesser extent. The Samogitian dialect also uses the "laužtinė priegaidė", a variant of the acute accent. It is similar to the Latvian broken tone and the Danish stød.

Choice of intonation is used in Lithuanian and other Indo-European languages to determine meaning. The other Indo-European languages include Latvian, Serbo-Croatian and Ancient Greek. Swedish and Norwegian also have tonal distinctions, but these latter are not Proto-Germanic in origin. Rather, they are a Scandinavian innovation where tonal differences have arisen when old monosyllabic words have received an additional vowel, but have kept their original tonal characteristics.

== Pronunciation ==
Friedrich Kurschat, in his "Grammar of the Lithuanian language" (Grammatik der littauischen Sprache, 1876) called the two accents "sudden" (gestossene Betonung) and "continued" (geschliffene Betonung). He described them as different variations (rise and fall) of tone and illustrated them with notes. The circumflex tone is described as a rise of a minor third interval and for the mixed diphthongs as a rise of a perfect fourth interval. The acute tone is described as a fall of a perfect fifth interval.

Kazimieras Jaunius describes strength of voice (more than tone) as an element differentiating between the two accents. The acute accent, tvirtapradė priegaidė changes from stronger and higher to weaker and lower. The circumflex accent, tvirtagalė changes from weaker and lower to stronger and higher.

Pronunciations of the two accents by speakers of dialects have minor differences. Vaitkevičiūtė studied the pronunciation of four words by speakers of different dialects. The words were the singular vocatives rýte ("morning"), rỹti (a male name), sū́ri ("cheese") and, sū̃ri ("saltiness"). The dialect speakers were from western Aukštaitians (Marijampolė, Vilkaviškis, Kazlų Rūda, Garliava), Veliuona, and Dzūkian.

=== Western Aukštaitija ===
In this region, the acute accent is more intense and has a higher pitch; the threshold of pitch between the accented syllable and the following syllable nucleus is larger (56 Hz versus 51 Hz), and the length of the nuclei of the syllables is shorter (rýte, where y = 394 ms and e = 163 ms versus rỹte where y = 433 ms and e = 194 ms). Vowels with an acute are significantly shorter and less intense that vowels with a circumflex (rýte, where y length = 190 ms and e length = 102 ms versus rỹte where y length = 286 ms and e length = 80 ms).

=== Veliuona ===
In this region, the acute accent is pronounced with a higher starting pitch, a shorter length and a similar intensity to the circumflex and the two accents are most easily distinguished (sū́ri, where ū length = 341 ms and i length = 170 ms versus sū̃ri where ū length = 526 ms and i length = 186 ms).

=== Dzūkija ===
In this region, the acute accent over a vowel is shorter and the threshold of pitch between the stressed syllable and the following syllable is smaller than with the circumflex. In rýte and rỹte, the fundamental frequency of the next, unstressed syllable was 78 Hz after an acute accent, and by 88 Hz after a circumflex. The length in rýte, where y = 164 ms; and e = 125 ms versus rỹte where y = 255 ms e = 124 ms.

== Articulation and length ==
When a vowel with an acute is articulated, articulators in mouth tense, the resonance of the epiglottis decreases and the larynx rises. When a vowel with a circumflex accent is articulates, the articulators are less tense, the resonance of the epiglottis increases and the larynx moves down.

== Possibilities for accentuation ==
=== Vowels ===
- Acute, long vowels: ą́, ę́, ė́, ý, į̇́, ó, ū́, ų́
- Grave, short vowels: à, è, ò, i̇̀, ù
- Tilde, long vowels: ã, ẽ, õ, ą̃, ę̃, ė̃, ỹ, į̇̃, ū̃, ų̃
- Tilde, short vowels: ã, ẽ

=== Diphthongs ===
- Compound diphthongs: ái–ai̇̃, áu–aũ, éi–ei̇̃, ùi–ui̇̃
- Mixed diphthongs: ál–al̃, ám–am̃, án–añ, ár–ar̃, él–el̃, ém–em̃, én–eñ, ér–er̃, i̇̀l–il̃, i̇̀m–im̃, i̇̀n–iñ, i̇̀r–ir̃, ùl–ul̃, ùm–um̃, ùn–uñ, ùr–ur̃
- Complex diphthongs: i̇́e–iẽ and úo–uõ.
- Foreign diphthongs used in Lithuanian: èl–el̃, èm–em̃, èn–eñ, èr–er̃, òl, òm, òn, òr, èu, òi, òu

The length of long vowels to complex diphthongs to simple diphthongs with different kinds of accentuation occurs in ratios of 1 : 1.12 : 1.25 with acute accentuation; 1 : 1.02 : 1.08 with circumflex accentuation; and, 1 : 1.09 : 1.15 with no accentuation.

When accentuated short vowels, such as ã or ẽ occur in a non-desinential syllable (one that does end in an inflection), either open or closed, they lengthen and always have a circumflex intonation. Their lengthening is not to the extent of a long vowel. Similarly, in this form, they may constitute the first part of a simple or mixed diphthong. For example,

- rãtas and ratù (wheel) (sg. nom. - sg. inst.)
- kẽlias and keliù (road)
- rãštas and raštù (script) in closed syllables
- rãktas and raktù (key)
- ẽglė and eglè (spruce)

In the pronominal masculine dative singular, a stressed letter a is acute if it is not on the last ending; e.g. gerasis 'the good' → gerájam.

There are some cases where these two sounds do not lengthen. In verbs, for example: mèsti (< *met-ti) – to throw, mèstas (or mẽstas) – thrown (but mẽtamas - being thrown). In foreign words: tèmai (dative) – theme, subject (nominative is temà 2). The rule of these two root-lengthening sounds does also not fit for sounds stressed in the ending: spalvà 4 – color (instrumental is spalvà); galvà 3 – head (instrumental is gálva); sodè loc. – in a garden (nominative sõdas 2).

Lengthened vowels a, e (and ą, ę, which were nasal in earlier times) are of the quality [aː], [æː]. Historically, there were long vowels ā, ē ([aː], [æː]), which today are the narrower o, ė.

=== Lengthening diphthongs ===
The contrast between the accents in diphthongs starting in a, e (au, ai, ei; a, e + l, m, n, r) is based on the quantity and quality. In acute accented cases, the first element is emphasized: it lengthens, is more tensed, open than the respective element in the circumflex cases. The second element of acute simple diphthongs is more open and less tensed than the respective element of the circumflex diphthongs.

In the circumflex cases the second element is emphasized and lengthened. But for the mixed diphthongs, the circumflex variant can also be pronounced without an emphasis and be understood only as shortness of a first element of a diphthong (in contrast to the acute, where the first element lengthens) in a standard language. In some cases, like in a word oppositional to várna 'crow': var̃nas 'raven', the r would occur more likely emphasized, than not. But in some, for example, var̃das 'name', it can occur either emphasized, or not (so that it would be understood by some as vàrdas in the latter case). Such pronunciation and understanding of a circumflex diphthong being more some like without emphasis of any of its two elements, but some like a shortness of a first element, could also fit for aũ, ai̇̃, ei̇̃ diphthongs, but an emphasis of the second element (similarly to the acute case, where the first element is emphasized) is characteristic for them too. The first element of circumflex cases is similar to a short unstressed vowel – not tensed, more closed. In an aũ case a vowel a receives a slight o shade (becomes narrower).

=== Not lengthening diphthongs ===
In the acute cases of the diphthongs starting in i, u (i, u + l, m, n, r; ui), the first element does not lengthen and tense in a standard language, but an emphasis remains. Since it does not lengthen, the acute accent is marked by a grave. The first element of acute mixed diphthongs e, o + l, m, n, r of a foreign origin, does not lengthen as well: hèrbas – coat of arms, spòrtas – sport.

In eastern and southern Aukštaitian, dialects these acute diphthongs are lengthened similarly to a, e starting diphthongs.

In the circumflex cases, articulation is like in a, e starting diphthongs: the second element is emphasized and lengthened.

=== Long vowels, complex diphthongs ===
In acute complex diphthongs (i.e., uo), the first element is more tensed and closed and the second element more closed, but less tensed than in the circumflex cases, but the two elements do not differ much.

The acute long vowels, similarly, are much more closed and more tensed than the circumflex, but the contrast is lesser than in the complex diphthongs.

=== Assimilation ===
The contrast between the two accents in vowels and complex diphthongs is disappearing, because the opposition between the two accents is not present in all the dialects. The base dialects of a standard language (western Aukštaitian) cover a smaller area. The standard language is being affected by different dialects, where speakers pronounce the two accents differently.

The mixed diphthongs starting in i, u and a simple diphthong ui are commonly pronounced without noticeable intensifying of one of the appropriate elements in both acute as well as circumflex cases. It is easy to intentionally intensify the second part in the circumflex accent, but it is common too, that it is impossible to extract, hear out them from the standard language, the sounds are pronounced without an attention on emphasizing some accentual oppositions. In a case of the mixed diphthongs starting in a, e the opposition can be understood at least by different quantity of these sounds: lengthened in the acute case, and not lengthen in the circumflex. Such lengthening helps to hold the two accents in the simple diphthongs (au, ai, ei) too (for example, in an ui case, where the first element is short, the opposition between accents is usually lost in a standard language), but in this case the lengthening, emphasis of the second element in the circumflex accentuation (similarly to the emphasis of the first element in the acute accentuation) is characteristic, not unusual.

Among the reasons of unification of accents in, for example, mixed diphthongs, there possibly is the absence of necessity to distinguish between them. For example, in the case of várna 'crow' - var̃nas 'raven', the r would probably usually be emphasized in var̃nas, but in a case of var̃das 'name', where there is no relative acute word, there can be no feeling for a speaker that they should emphasize a sound r. But in these cases the distinction can be understood through quantity of a sound – the acute variant has lengthened a, and the circumflex – not lengthened. So, in diphthongs, the problematic leave i, u starting diphthongs, where a standard language speaker has no means to hear, directly knows what type of the accent they should have (if they are stressed).

== Word part stress and accent ==
=== Prefix ===
- apý-, ató-, núo-, pó-, pri̇́e-, pri̇́eš-, pró-, są́-, sám-, sán-, užúo-, when they are stressed, are acute in all parts of language, which have them.
- ap-, at-, pa-, pra-, be-, when they are stressed, are circumflex in nouns, ãp-, ãt-, pã-, prã-, bẽ-, and short in verbs and participles, àp-, àt-, pà-, prà-, bè-.
- nu-, pri-, už-, had by verbs, are short. In nouns made from these verbs they are either nuo-, prie-, or nu-, pri-, už-, but nu-, pri- are possibly used only with verbal abstracts endings in -imas, -ymas, -umas; nunèšti – to carry away, bear away, to take some thing somewhere, nùneša (present III person), nuneši̇̀mas – a carrying away, núonaša – a thing which is (being) carried away; primaišýti – to admix, primai̇̃šo, primai̇̃šymas, pri̇́emaiša – admixture; užkùrti – to kindle, start a fire, ùžkuria, užkūri̇̀mas, ùžkuras – a portion of material which is (being) fired.
- pa- in adjectives, when stressed, is elongated for a part of them, and short for another part: pãdrikas – desultory, scattered, pàprastas – simple, ordinary.
- į-, when stressed, is circumflex in verbs and participles (į̇̃-), and acute (į̇́-) in nouns.
- per- is always stressed and is acute (pér-), except the nouns, made from other nouns (per̃-): per̃taras – expletive, per̃petė – shoulder-belt, per̃pietė – afterdinner nap, per̃teklius – surplus (but they are also pronounced as acute).

=== Root ===
Short vowels a, e in a root of a word lengthen when stressed and have a circumflex accent: ã, ẽ: (sg. nom. - sg. inst.) kẽlias - keliù 'road', rãtas - ratù 'wheel'. But these vowels do not lengthen in foreign words, some forms of disyllabic verbs: temà - tèmos 'theme' (sg. nom. - pl. nom./sg. gen.); mèsti 'to throw', mèstas (or mẽstas) 'thrown (past passive participle)'

=== Suffix ===
Some of the suffixes receive acute, some circumflex accents and some – either of the accents. But in the latter case the words having such suffixes have either the different endings, for example: kaimýnas – neighbour, lentýna – shelf and tėvỹnė – fatherland, lenktỹnės pl. – racing. Or the endings are same, but the words still have differences in meaning: viršū́nė – peak, summit, pinnacle, Valiū́nas, Mickū́nas (surnames) and klajū̃nė (f) – wanderer (the suffix has actor's meaning), klajū̃nas – wanderer, malū̃nas – mill.

=== Ending ===
Long endings (long vowels and diphthongs), if stressed, are accented in a circumflex accent except a few cases where acute accent occurs – dative singular (unstressed in nouns): gerám (geras - good), pronominal gerájam (< *gerám-jam); gẽrai f, pronominal gẽrajai; dative plural: geri̇́ems, pron. geri̇́esiems; geróms, pron. gerósioms; nakti̇̀ms (naktis - night). And in pronominal forms, besides datives, there are more acute ending cases – instrumental singular masculine and feminine: gerúoju (indefinite form: gerù), gerą́ja (< *gerán-jan) (indefinite: gerà); pl. acc. masc. and fem.: gerúosius (indefinite: gerùs), gerą́sias (indefinite: geràs).

Historically, some endings which are short today, where acute: gerù 'sg. ins. of geras – good' (< gerúo) : gerúoju (pronominal); keliù 'to be raising; to raise' (< keliúo) : keliúosi 'to be getting up; to get up (reflexive of keliu)'.

In nouns the singular dative and accusative forms are never stressed in the ending. Some of the declensional cases, which in some of the four accentuation patterns are stressed, in other – not stressed, are short: singular feminine nominative -à (stressed in the II, III, IV accentuation patterns), singular instrumental and locative, plural accusative and locative.

== Nouns ==
Lithuanian nominal stems are divided into four accentual classes, usually referred to by their numbers. They are defined by the place and type (acute, circumflex accents of syllable, short stress) of the accent. The accent is either steady in the same syllable in all cases (the first pattern), or moves to the ending in one of the three patterns. Here follows the wording along the data, which is also seen in the tables below:

1. Fixed (columnar) accent on a non-desinential syllable. If the accent is on a pre-desinential syllable, it carries the acute (acute) tone. For polysyllabic words, when they are stressed in the further from the ending syllable than the pre-desinential one is, the type of an accent can be any of the three. When the syllable stressed is further from the ending than the pre-desinential, it is most usually the first syllable of a noun.
2. Alternation of stress on a short or circumflex (circumflex) pre-desinential syllable with desinential accentuation in a few cases. Only disyllabic nouns.
3. Alternation of stress on a non-desinential syllable with desinential accentuation. If the accent is on a pre-desinential syllable, it carries the acute tone. Polysyllabic nouns are accented in a further than the pre-desinential syllable from the ending by any kind of the stress. There are only a marginal number of polysyllabic nouns that have stress on a pre-desinential syllable. Place of a stress is in the ending in certain cases, resembling the fourth pattern. If the intonation is acute the word has a mark 3a, 34a, (35a, 36a) written by in dictionaries, and if a circumflex or short, the mark is 3b, 34b, (35b, 36b); the number three means the number of an accentuation pattern, the letter a means the acute intonation, the letter b is for a circumflex intonation or a short stress; if the accent is in a further than the third syllable from the ending the other digit is added, for instance, 34b means that the stress falls on the fourth from the ending syllable and (b) it is short or of circumflex intonation.
4. Alternation of stress on short or circumflex pre-desinential syllable with desinential accentuation (among these, all cases in plural number, except some in -a, -ė, -is (gen. -ies), -us types). The number of polysyllabic words of this pattern is marginal, two common nouns and few place names.

Relation between accent type and accentuation pattern (the certain stress places in the cases):

- The words having circumflex intonation (|__̃|-|__|) or short sound stress (|_̀|-|__|) in the pre-desinential syllable (in the stem accentuation cases; in other cases they have accent on the desinence) are accentuated in the second or the fourth patterns.
- The words having acute intonation (|_́_|-|__|, |_̀_|-|__|) in the next-to-last syllable (for the first accentuation pattern the accent falls only on the stem, for the third it moves to the ending in certain cases) are accentuated in the first or the third patterns.

=== Accentuation tables ===
	I		II			III		IV	
Nominative; Genitive; Dative; Accusative; Instrumental; Locative; Vocative	sývas sývo sývui sývą sývu sýve sýve	i̇̀rklas i̇̀rklo i̇̀rklui i̇̀rklą i̇̀rklu i̇̀rkle i̇̀rkle	sõdas sõdo sõdui sõdą sodù sodè sõde	mẽtas mẽto mẽtui mẽtą metù metè mẽte	iñdas iñdo iñdui iñdą indù indè iñde	stógas stógo stógui stógą stógu stogè stóge	krė́slas krė́slo krė́slui krė́slą krė́slu krėslè krė́sle	strãzdas strãzdo strãzdui strãzdą strazdù strazdè strãzde	lẽdas lẽdo lẽdui lẽdą ledù ledè lẽde
Nominative; Genitive; Dative; Accusative; Instrumental; Locative	sývai sývų sývams sývus sývais sývuose	i̇̀rklai i̇̀rklų i̇̀rklams i̇̀rklus i̇̀rklais i̇̀rkluose	sõdai sõdų sõdams sodùs sõdais sõduose	mẽtai mẽtų mẽtams metùs mẽtais mẽtuose	iñdai iñdų iñdams indùs iñdais iñduose	stogai̇̃ stogų̃ stogáms stógus stogai̇̃s stoguosè	krėslai̇̃ krėslų̃ krėsláms krė́slus krėslai̇̃s krėsluosè	strazdai̇̃ strazdų̃ strazdáms strazdùs strazdai̇̃s strazduosè	ledai̇̃ ledų̃ ledáms ledùs ledai̇̃s leduosè

spùrga spùrgos spùrgai spùrgą spùrga spùrgoje spùrga	rankà rañkos rañkai rañką rankà rañkoje rañka	galvà galvõs gálvai gálvą gálva galvojè gálva	dainà dainõs dai̇̃nai dai̇̃ną dainà dainojè dai̇̃na
spùrgos spùrgų spùrgoms spùrgas spùrgomis spùrgose	rañkos rañkų rañkoms rankàs rañkomis rañkose	gálvos galvų̃ galvóms gálvas galvomi̇̀s galvosè	dai̇̃nos dainų̃ dainóms dainàs dainomi̇̀s dainosè

brólis brólio bróliui brólį bróliu brólyje bróli	mẽdis mẽdžio mẽdžiui mẽdį medžiù mẽdyje mẽdi	arklỹs árklio árkliui árklį árkliu arklyjè arklỹ	vélnias vélnio vélniui vélnią vélniu velnyjè vélniau	kepsnỹs kẽpsnio kẽpsniui kẽpsnį kepsniù kepsnyjè kepsnỹ	kẽlias kẽlio kẽliui kẽlią keliù kelyjè kelỹ
bróliai brólių bróliams brólius bróliais bróliuose	mẽdžiai mẽdžių mẽdžiams medžiùs mẽdžiais mẽdžiuose	arkliai̇̃ arklių̃ arkliáms árklius arkliai̇̃s arkliuosè	velniai̇̃ velnių̃ velniáms vélnius velniai̇̃s velniuosè	kepsniai̇̃ kepsnių̃ kepsniáms kepsniùs kepsniai̇̃s kepsniuosè	keliai̇̃ kelių̃ keliáms keliùs keliai̇̃s keliuosè

dróbė dróbės dróbei dróbę dróbe dróbėje dróbe	brãškė brãškės brãškei brãškę braškè brãškėje brãške	varškė̃ varškė̃s várškei várškę várške varškėjè várške	erdvė̃ erdvė̃s er̃dvei er̃dvę erdvè erdvėjè er̃dve
dróbės dróbių dróbėms dróbes dróbėmis dróbėse	brãškės brãškių brãškėms braškès brãškėmis brãškėse	várškės varškių̃ varškė́ms várškes varškėmi̇̀s varškėsè	er̃dvės erdvių̃ erdvė́ms erdvès erdvėmi̇̀s erdvėsè

tóšis tóšies tóšiai tóšį tóšimi tóšyje tóšie	sli̇̀stis sli̇̀sties sli̇̀sčiai sli̇̀stį sli̇̀stimi sli̇̀styje sli̇̀stie	širdi̇̀s širdiẽs ši̇̀rdžiai ši̇̀rdį širdimi̇̀ širdyjè širdiẽ	nakti̇̀s naktiẽs nãkčiai nãktį naktimi̇̀ naktyjè naktiẽ	šuõ šuñs šùniui šùnį šunimi̇̀ šunyjè šuniẽ
tóšys tóšių tóšims tóšis tóšimis tóšyse	sli̇̀stys sli̇̀sčių sli̇̀stims slisti̇̀s sli̇̀stimis sli̇̀styse	ši̇̀rdys širdžių̃ širdi̇̀ms ši̇̀rdis širdimi̇̀s širdysè	nãktys naktų̃ nakti̇̀ms nakti̇̀s naktimi̇̀s naktysè	šùnys šunų̃ šuni̇̀ms šuni̇̀s šunimi̇̀s šunysè

ámžius ámžiaus ámžiui ámžių ámžiumi ámžiuje ámžiau	tur̃gus tur̃gaus tur̃gui tur̃gų tur̃gumi tur̃guje tur̃gau	sõdžius sõdžiaus sõdžiui sõdžių sõdžiumi sõdžiuje sõdžiau	sūnùs sūnaũs sū́nui sū́nų sūnumi̇̀ sūnujè sūnaũ	viršùs viršaũs vir̃šui vir̃šų viršumi̇̀ viršujè viršaũ
ámžiai ámžių ámžiams ámžius ámžiais ámžiuose	tur̃gūs tur̃gų tur̃gums turgùs tur̃gumis tur̃guose	sõdžiai sõdžių sõdžiams sodžiùs sõdžiais sõdžiuose	sū́nūs sūnų̃ sūnùms sū́nus sūnumi̇̀s sūnuosè	vir̃šūs viršų̃ viršùms viršùs viršumi̇̀s viršuosè

II
dalỹkas dalỹko dalỹkui dalỹką dalykù dalykè dalỹke	vaiki̇̀nas vaiki̇̀no vaiki̇̀nui vaiki̇̀ną vaikinù vaikinè vaiki̇̀ne	merginà mergi̇̀nos mergi̇̀nai mergi̇̀ną merginà mergi̇̀noje mergi̇̀na	sveikatà sveikãtos sveikãtai sveikãtą sveikatà sveikãtoje sveikãta	balañdis balañdžio balañdžiui balañdį balandžiù balañdyje balañdis	jaunuõlis jaunuõlio jaunuõliui jaunuõlį jaunuoliù jaunuõlyje jaunuõli	jaunuõlė jaunuõlės jaunuõlei jaunuõlę jaunuolè jaunuõlėje jaunuõle	kepùrė kepùrės kepùrei kepùrę kepurè kepùrėje kepùre	pavõjus pavõjaus pavõjui pavõjų pavõjumi pavõjuose pavõjai
dalỹkai dalỹkų dalỹkams dalykùs dalỹkais dalỹkuose	vaiki̇̀nai vaiki̇̀nų vaiki̇̀nams vaikinùs vaiki̇̀nais vaiki̇̀nuose	mergi̇̀nos mergi̇̀nų mergi̇̀noms merginàs mergi̇̀nomis mergi̇̀nose	sveikãtos sveikãtų sveikãtoms sveikatàs sveikãtomis sveikãtose	balañdžiai balañdžių balañdžiams balandžiùs balañdžiais balañdžiuose	jaunuõliai jaunuõlių jaunuõliams jaunuoliùs jaunuõliais jaunuõliuose	jaunuõlės jaunuõlių jaunuõlėms jaunuolès jaunuõlėmis jaunuõlėse	kepùrės kepùrių kepùrėms kepurès kepùrėmis kepùrėse	pavõjai pavõjų pavõjams pavojùs pavõjais pavõjuose

III
vi̇́esulas vi̇́esulo vi̇́esului vi̇́esulą vi̇́esulu viesulè vi̇́esule	pãdaras pãdaro pãdarui pãdarą pãdaru padarè pãdare	ki̇̀biras ki̇̀biro ki̇̀birui ki̇̀birą ki̇̀biru kibirè ki̇̀bire	gniùtulas gniùtulo gniùtului gniùtulą gniùtulu gniutulè gniùtule	gyvulỹs gývulio gývuliui gývulį gývuliu gyvulyjè gyvulỹ	auksakalỹs áuksakalio áuksakaliui áuksakalį áuksakaliu auksakalyjè auksakalỹ	švyturỹs švỹturio švỹturiui švỹturį švỹturiu švyturyjè švyturỹ	vyndarỹs vỹndario vỹndariui vỹndarį vỹndariu vyndaryjè vyndarỹ	rutulỹs rùtulio rùtuliui rùtulį rùtuliu rutulyjè rutulỹ
viesulai̇̃ viesulų̃ viesuláms vi̇́esulus viesulai̇̃s viesuluosè	padarai̇̃ padarų̃ padaráms pãdarus padarai̇̃s padaruosè	kibirai̇̃ kibirų̃ kibiráms ki̇̀birus kibirai̇̃s kibiruosè	gniutulai̇̃ gniutulų̃ gniutuláms gniùtulus gniutulai̇̃s gniutuluosè	gyvuliai̇̃ gyvulių̃ gyvuliáms gỹvulius gyvuliai̇̃s gyvuliuosè	auksakaliai̇̃ auksakalių̃ auksakaliáms áuksakalius auksakaliai̇̃s auksakaliuosè	švyturiai̇̃ švyturių̃ švyturiáms švỹturius švyturiai̇̃s švyturiuosè	vyndariai̇̃ vyndarių̃ vyndariáms vỹndarius vyndariai̇̃s vyndariuosè	rutuliai̇̃ rutulių̃ rutuliáms rùtulius rutuliai̇̃s rutuliuosè

III
aukštumà aukštumõs áukštumai áukštumą áukštuma aukštumojè áukštuma	dykumà dykumõs dỹkumai dỹkumą dỹkuma dykumojè dỹkuma	pakarpà pakarpõs pãkarpai pãkarpą pãkarpa pakarpojè pãkarpa	iškilumà iškilumõs i̇̀škilumai i̇̀škilumą i̇̀škiluma iškilumojè i̇̀škiluma	auksakalė̃ auksakalė̃s áuksakalei áuksakalę áuksakale auksakalėjè áuksakale	vyndarė̃ vyndarė̃s vỹndarei vỹndarę vỹndare vyndarėjè vỹndare
áukštumos aukštumų̃ aukštumóms áukštumas aukštumomi̇̀s aukštumosè	dỹkumos dykumų̃ dykumóms dỹkumas dykumomi̇̀s dykumosè	pãkarpos pakarpų̃ pakarpóms pãkarpas pakarpomi̇̀s pakarposè	i̇̀škilumos iškilumų̃ iškilumóms i̇̀škilumas iškilumomi̇̀s iškilumosè	áuksakalės auksakalių̃ auksakalė́ms áuksakales auksakalėmi̇̀s auksakalėsè	vỹndarės vyndarių̃ vyndarė́ms vỹndares vyndarėmi̇̀s vyndarėsè

III
obeli̇̀s obeliẽs óbeliai óbelį obelimi̇̀ obelyjè obeliẽ	patirti̇̀s patirtiẽs pãtirčiai pãtirtį patirtimi̇̀ patirtyjè patirtiẽ	kibirkšti̇̀s kibirkštiẽs ki̇̀birkščiai ki̇̀birkštį kibirkštimi̇̀ kibirkštyjè kibirkštiẽ	vanduõ vandeñs vándeniui vándenį vandenimi̇̀ vandenyjè vandeniẽ	akmuõ akmeñs ãkmeniui ãkmenį akmenimi̇̀ akmenyjè akmeniẽ
óbelys obelų̃ obeli̇̀ms óbelis obelimi̇̀s obelysè	pãtirtys patirčių̃ patirti̇̀ms pãtirtis patirtimi̇̀s patirtysè	ki̇̀birkštys kibirkščių̃ kibirkšti̇̀ms ki̇̀birkštis kibirkštimi̇̀s kibirkštysè	vándenys vandenų̃ vandeni̇̀ms vándenis vandenimi̇̀s vandenysè	ãkmenys akmenų̃ akmeni̇̀ms ãkmenis akmenimi̇̀s akmenysè

I
daržóvė daržóvės daržóvei daržóvę daržóve daržóvėje daržóve	šešė́lis šešė́lio šešė́liui šešė́lį šešė́liu šešė́lyje šešė́li	pavãsaris pavãsario pavãsariui pavãsarį pavãsariu pavãsaryje pavãsari	vãsara vãsaros vãsarai vãsarą vãsara vãsaroje vãsara	liùdytojas liùdytojo liùdytojui liùdytoją liùdytoju liùdytojuje liùdytojau	sánkaba sánkabos sánkabai sánkabą sánkaba sánkaboje sánkaba
daržóvės daržóvėms daržóvių daržóvėmis daržóves daržóvėse	šešė́liai šešė́lių šešė́liams šešė́lius šešė́liais šešė́liuose	pavãsariai pavãsarių pavãsariams pavãsarius pavãsariais pavãsariuose	vãsaros vãsarų vãsaroms vãsaras vãsaromis vãsarose	liùdytoja liùdytojų liùdytojams liùdytojus liùdytojais liùdytojuose	sánkabos sánkabų sánkaboms sánkabas sánkabomis sánkabose
