= Lithuanian phonology =

Phonology of the Lithuanian language

Lithuanian has 11 vowels and 45 consonants, including 22 pairs of consonants distinguished by the presence or absence of palatalization. Most vowels come in pairs which are differentiated through length and degree of centralization.

Only one syllable in the word bears the accent, but exactly which syllable is often unpredictable. Accented syllables are marked with either a falling or rising tone. Its location in a word may also be affected during inflection.

== Consonants ==
Consonant phonemes of Lithuanian
		Labial		Dental		Alveolar		Palatal	Velar	
		hard	soft	hard	soft	hard	soft	Palatal	hard	soft
Nasal		m ⟨m⟩	mʲ ⟨mi⟩	n ⟨n⟩	nʲ ⟨ni⟩					
Plosive	voiceless	p ⟨p⟩	pʲ ⟨pi⟩	t ⟨t⟩	tʲ ⟨ti⟩				k ⟨k⟩	kʲ ⟨ki⟩
Plosive	voiced	b ⟨b⟩	bʲ ⟨bi⟩	d ⟨d⟩	dʲ ⟨di⟩				ɡ ⟨g⟩	ɡʲ ⟨gi⟩
Affricate	voiceless			t͡s ⟨c⟩	t͡sʲ ⟨ci⟩	t͡ʃ ⟨č⟩	t͡ɕ ⟨či⟩			
Affricate	voiced			d͡z ⟨dz⟩	d͡zʲ ⟨dzi⟩	d͡ʒ ⟨dž⟩	d͡ʑ ⟨dži⟩			
Fricative	voiceless	(f) ⟨f⟩	(fʲ) ⟨fi⟩	s ⟨s⟩	sʲ ⟨si⟩	ʃ ⟨š⟩	ɕ ⟨ši⟩		(x) ⟨ch⟩	(xʲ) ⟨chi⟩
Fricative	voiced	v ⟨v⟩	vʲ ⟨vi⟩	z ⟨z⟩	zʲ ⟨zi⟩	ʒ ⟨ž⟩	ʑ ⟨ži⟩	j ⟨j⟩	(ɣ) ⟨h⟩	(ɣʲ) ⟨hi⟩
Approximant		v ⟨v⟩	vʲ ⟨vi⟩	ɫ ⟨l⟩			lʲ ⟨li⟩	j ⟨j⟩		
Trill						r ⟨r⟩	rʲ ⟨ri⟩			

All Lithuanian consonants except /j/ have two variants: a non-palatalized one and a palatalized one (traditionally called 'hard' and 'soft', respectively), represented by the IPA symbols in the chart (i.e., /b/ – /bʲ/, /d/ – /dʲ/, /ɡ/ – /ɡʲ/, and so on). The consonants /f/, /x/, /ɣ/ and their palatalized variants are only found in loanwords. Consonants preceding the front vowels /ɪ/, /iː/, /ɛ/, /æː/ and /eː/, as well as any palatalized consonant or /j/, are always moderately palatalized (a feature Lithuanian has in common with the Belarusian and Russian languages but which is not present in the more closely related Latvian). Before back vowels /aː/, /ɐ/, /oː/, /ɔ/, /uː/, and /ʊ/, consonants can also be palatalized (causing some vowels to shift; see the Vowels section below); in such cases, the standard orthography inserts the letter i between the vowel and the preceding consonant (which is not pronounced separately), e.g. noriu [ˈnôːrʲʊ], ('I want'). Most of the non-palatalized and palatalized consonants form minimal pairs (like šuo [ʃuə], 'dog' ~ šiuo [ɕuə], 'with this one'), so they are independent phonemes, rather than allophones.

- All consonants are labialized before the back vowels /ʊ, uː, oː/. The hard alveolar fricatives /ʃ, ʒ/ are also somewhat labialized in other positions.
- All of the hard consonants (especially /ɫ, ʃ, ʒ/) are velarized.
- /n, t, d/ are laminal denti-alveolar [n̪, t̪, d̪].
  - /t, d/ are alveolar [t, d] before /r/.
- /nʲ/ has been variously described as palatalized laminal denti-alveolar [n̪ʲ] and palatalized laminal alveolar [n̻ʲ].
- /tʲ, dʲ/ have been variously described as:
  - Alveolo-palatal [c̟, ɟ˖]
  - Palatalized laminal denti-alveolar [t̪ʲ, d̪ʲ] with alveolar allophones [tʲ, dʲ] before /rʲ/.
- Word-final /t, k/ and sometimes also /p/ are aspirated [t̪ʰ, kʰ, pʰ].
- /t͡s, t͡sʲ, d͡z, d͡zʲ, s, sʲ, z, zʲ/ are dentalized laminal alveolar [t̪͡s̪, t̪͡s̪ʲ, d̪͡z̪, d̪͡z̪ʲ, s̪, s̪ʲ, z̪, z̪ʲ], pronounced with the blade of the tongue very close to the upper front teeth, with the tip of the tongue resting behind lower front teeth.
- /t͡ʃ, d͡ʒ, ʃ, ʒ/ are laminal flat postalveolar [t͡ʃ˖, d͡ʒ˖, ʃ˖, ʒ˖], i.e. they are pronounced without any palatalization at all.
- /t͡ɕ, d͡ʑ, ɕ, ʑ/ are alveolo-palatal [t͡ɕ, d͡ʑ, ɕ, ʑ]. Traditionally, they are transcribed with ⟨t͡ʃʲ, d͡ʒʲ, ʃʲ, ʒʲ⟩, but these can be more accurately and simply indicated as ⟨t͡ɕ, d͡ʑ, ɕ, ʑ⟩.
- /v, vʲ/ have been variously described as fricatives [v, vʲ] and approximants [ʋ, ʋʲ].
- /ɫ/ is laminal denti-alveolar [ɫ̪].
- /lʲ/ has been variously described as palatalized alveolar [lʲ] and palatalized laminal denti-alveolar [l̪ʲ].
- /j/ has been variously described as an approximant [j] and a fricative [ʝ].
- /r, rʲ/ are apical alveolar [r̺, r̺ʲ].
- Before /k, ɡ/, /n/ is realized as velar [ŋ]. Likewise, before /kʲ, ɡʲ/, /nʲ/ is realized as [ŋʲ].
- In some dialects, /ɣ/ is sometimes realized as [ɦ]. Since the palatalized variant is always velar [ɣʲ], [ɣ] is preferred over [ɦ].
- In the case of the soft velar consonants /kʲ, ɡʲ, xʲ, ɣʲ/ (as well as the [ŋʲ] allophone of /n/), the softness (palatalization) is realized as slight fronting of the place of articulation to post-palatal [k̟, ɡ˖, x̟, ɣ˖, ŋ˖]. However, according to Augustaitis (1964), the stops /kʲ, ɡʲ/ are more strongly advanced, i.e. to palatal [c, ɟ], rather than post-palatal [k̟, ɡ˖].
- Plosives have no audible release before other plosives.
- Some speakers use [ʀ] instead of [r].

== Vowels ==
Lithuanian has six long vowels and four short ones (not including /e/ and /ɔ/). Length has traditionally been considered the distinctive feature, though short vowels are also more centralized and long vowels more peripheral:

	Front		Back	
	short	long	short	long
Close	ɪ ⟨i⟩	iː ⟨į, y⟩	ʊ ⟨u⟩	uː ⟨ų, ū⟩
Close-mid	(e) ⟨e⟩	eː ⟨ė⟩		oː ⟨o⟩
Open-mid	ɛ ⟨e, ia⟩	ɛː ⟨e, ia, ę, ią⟩	(ɔ) ⟨o⟩	
Open		(æː) ⟨e, ia, ę, ią⟩	ɐ ⟨a⟩	aː ⟨a, ą⟩

- /e, ɔ/ are restricted to loanwords. Many speakers merge the former with /ɛ/.
- /ɐ, aː/ are phonetically central. Phonologically, they behave like back vowels.

In standard Lithuanian vowels [aː] and [ɐ] generally are not pronounced after any palatalized consonant (including [j]). In this position, they systematically shift to [æː] or [ɛː] and [ɛ] respectively: galia ('power' singular nominative) = gale ('in the end' singular locative) [ɡɐˈlʲɛ], gilią ('deep'(as in 'a deep hole') or 'profound' singular accusative) = gilę ('acorn' singular accusative) [ˈɡʲɪlʲæː].

On the other hand, in everyday language [ɛː] usually shifts to [æː] (or sometimes even [aː]) if the vowel precedes a non-palatalized consonant: jachtą, ('yacht' singular accusative), or retas, ('rare'), are often realized as [ˈjæːxtaː] and [ˈrʲæːtɐs] (or sometimes even [ˈjaːxtaː] and [ˈrʲaːtɐs]) instead of [ˈjɛːxtaː] and [ˈrʲɛːtɐs] as the following consonants /x/ and /t/ are not palatalized. This phenomenon does not affect short vowels.

=== Diphthongs ===
Lithuanian is traditionally described as having nine diphthongs, ai, au, ei, eu, oi, ou, ui, ie, and uo. However, some approaches (i.e., Schmalstieg 1982) treat them as vowel sequences rather than diphthongs; indeed, the longer component depends on the type of stress, whereas in diphthongs, the longer segment is fixed.

Lithuanian long stressed syllables can have either a rising or a falling tone. In specialized literature, they are marked with a tilde ⟨˜⟩ or an acute accent ⟨´⟩ respectively. The tone is especially clearly audible in diphthongs, since in the case of the rising tone, it makes the second element longer (e.g., ai̇̃ is pronounced [ɐɪ̯ˑ]), while the falling tone prolongs the first element (e.g., ái is pronounced [âˑɪ̯]) (for more detailed information, see Lithuanian accentuation). The full set is as follows:

	stressless or tilde	acute stress
ai	[ɐɪ̯ˑ]	[âˑɪ̯]
ei	[ɛɪ̯ˑ]	[æ̂ˑɪ̯]
au	[ɒʊ̯ˑ]	[âˑʊ̯]
eu	[ɛʊ̯ˑ]	[æ̂ˑʊ̯]
iau	[ɛʊ̯ˑ]	[æ̂ˑʊ̯]
ie	[iə]	[îə]
oi	–	[ɔ̂ɪ̯]
ou	–	[ɔ̂ʊ̯]
ui	[ʊɪ̯ˑ]	[ʊ̂ɪ̯]
uo	[uə]	[ûə]

== Pitch accent ==
The Lithuanian prosodic system is characterized by free accent and distinctive quantity. Its accentuation is sometimes described as a simple tone system, often called pitch accent. In lexical words, one syllable will be tonically prominent. A heavy syllable—that is, a syllable containing a long vowel, diphthong, or a sonorant coda—may have one of two tones, falling tone (or acute tone) or rising tone (or circumflex tone). Light syllables (syllables with short vowels and optionally also obstruent codas) do not have the two-way contrast of heavy syllables.

Common Lithuanian lexicographical practice uses three diacritic marks to indicate word accent, i.e., the tone and quantity of the accented syllable. They are used in the following way:

- The first (or the only) segment of a heavy syllable with a falling tone is indicated with an acute accent mark (e.g., á, ár), unless the first element is i or u followed by a tautosyllabic resonant, in which case it is marked with a grave accent mark (e.g., i̇̀r, ùr).
- The second (or the only) segment of a heavy syllable with a rising tone is indicated with a circumflex accent (e.g., ã, ar̃)
- Short accented syllables are indicated with a grave accent mark (e.g., i̇̀, ù).

As said, Lithuanian has a free accent, which means that its position and type is not phonologically predictable and has to be learned "by heart" (i.e. through rote learning). This is the state of affairs inherited from Proto-Balto-Slavic and, to a lesser extent, from Proto-Indo-European; Lithuanian circumflex and acute syllables directly reflect Proto-Balto-Slavic acute and circumflex tone opposition.

In a word-final position, the tonal distinction in heavy syllables is almost neutralized, with a few minimal pairs remaining such as šáuk, ('shoot!'), vs. šaũk, ('shout!)'. In other syllables, the two-way contrast can be illustrated with pairs such as: kóšė ('[he/she] strained [a liquid]') vs. kõšė ('porridge'); áušti ('to cool') vs. aũšti ('to dawn'); dri̇́mba ('lout') vs. drim̃ba ('it falls'); káltas ('was hit with a hammer'/'chisel') vs. kal̃tas ('guilty'), týrė ('[he/she] explored') vs. tỹrė ('mush'), atidúsai ('hey, the attive one!') vs. atidusai̇́ ('you have come back from suffocation').

Kóšė is perceived as having a falling pitch (/ˈkôːɕeː/ or /ˈkóòɕeː/), and indeed acoustic measurement strongly supports this. However, while kõšė is perceived as having a rising pitch ([ˈkǒːɕeː] or [ˈkòóɕeː]), this is not supported acoustically; measurements do not find a consistent tone associated with such syllables that distinguish them from unaccented heavy syllables. The distinguishing feature appears to be a negative one, that they do not have a falling tone.

If diphthongs (and truly long vowels) are treated as sequences of vowels, then a single stress mark is sufficient for transcription: áušta /ˈauʃta/ > [ˈâˑʊʃtɐ] ('it cools') vs. aũšta /aˈuʃta/ > [ɐˈuˑʃtɐ] ('it dawns'); kóšė /ˈkooɕe/ > [ˈkôːɕeː] ('[he/she] strained [a liquid]') vs. kõšė /koˈoɕe/ > [koˈoˑɕeː] ('porridge').

The Lithuanian accentual system inherited another very important aspect from the Proto-Balto-Slavic period, and that is the accentual mobility. Accents can alternate throughout the inflection of a word by both the syllable position and type. Parallels can be drawn with some modern Slavic languages, namely Russian, Serbo-Croatian and Slovene. Accentual mobility is prominent in nominal stems, while verbal stems mostly demonstrate phonologically predictable patterns.

Lithuanian nominal stems are commonly divided into four accentual classes, usually referred to by their numbers:

- Accent paradigm 1: Fixed (columnar) accent on a non-desinential syllable. If the accent is on a pre-desinential syllable, it carries the acute tone.
- Accent paradigm 2: Alternation of accent on a short or circumflex pre-desinential syllable with desinential accentuation.
- Accent paradigm 3: Alternation of accent on a non-desinential syllable with desinential accentuation. If the accent is on a pre-desinential syllable, it carries the acute tone.
- Accent paradigm 4: Alternation of accent on short or circumflex pre-desinential syllable with desinential accentuation.

number	case	Accent paradigm 1	Accent paradigm 2	Accent paradigm 3	Accent paradigm 4
sg	N	výras	rankà	galvà	diẽvas
sg	V	výre	rañka	gálva	diẽve
sg	A	výrą	rañką	gálvą	diẽvą
sg	G	výro	rañkos	galvõs	diẽvo
sg	D	výrui	rañkai	gálvai	diẽvui
sg	L	výre/vyrè	rañkoje	galvojè	dievè
sg	I	výru	rankà	gálva	dievù
pl	NV	výrai	rañkos	gálvos	dievai̇̃
pl	A	výrus	rankàs	gálvas	dievùs
pl	G	výrų	rañkų	galvų̃	dievų̃
pl	D	výrams	rañkoms	galvóms	dieváms
pl	L	výruose	rañkose	galvosè	dievuosè
pl	I	výrais	rañkomis	galvomi̇̀s	dievai̇̃s

The previously described accentual system primarily applies to the Western Aukštaitian dialect on which the standard Lithuanian literary language is based. The speakers of the other group of Lithuanian dialects – Samogitian – have a very different accentual system, and they do not adopt standard accentuation when speaking the standard idiom. Speakers of the major cities, such as Vilnius, Kaunas and Klaipėda, with mixed populations generally do not have intonational oppositions in spoken language, even when they speak the standard idiom.

== Change and variation ==
The changes and variation in Lithuanian phonetics include diachronic changes of a quality of a phoneme, alternations, dialectal variation, variation between corresponding sounds of individual inflectional morphemes of the same grammatical category, which is at the same time qualitative and quantitative, diachronic and synchronic.

- The diachronic qualitative phonemic changes include o /oː/ ← ā (a narrowing of a more open vowel), uo ← ō turnings.
- Among examples of the variation between sounds of different inflectional morphemes of a certain grammatical category there is historical shortening of a declensional ending a in some positions: motina ('mother' nom. sg.-instr. sg.) < *mātina < *mātinā, *mātinās > motinos (gen. sg.). Synchronous variation between shorter (more recent) and longer (more archaic) personal endings in verbs, depending on final position: keliu ('I am lifting something')' – keliuosi ('I am getting up' reflexive); keli ('you are lifting') – keliesi ('you get up'); keliame ('we are lifting) ' – keliamės ('we get up').
- Examples of alternation include variation between /d, t/ and palatalized /d͡ʑ t͡ɕ/ respectively: nom. sg. pat-s 'myself; himself; itself' (masculine gender), gen. sg. pat-ies, dat. sg. pač-iam; jaučiu 'I feel', jauti 'you feel'; girdžiu 'I hear', girdi 'you hear'. Variation between a lengthened, uttered in a falling, lengthened tone and a short a and e alike (only if these sounds end a syllable), variation between a long, uttered in a falling, lengthened tone and a short i at an ending of a word, depending on accentual position: vãkaras [ˈvaːkɐrɐs] nominative 'an evening', vakarè [vɐkɐˈrʲɛ] locative 'in the evening'; radinỹs [rɐdʲɪˈniːs] nom. 'a finding, a find', rãdinio [ˈraːdʲɪnʲoː] genitive (from ràsti [ˈrɐsʲtʲɪ] 'to find'); pãtiekalas 'a dish, course', patiekalai̇̃ nom. plural. (from patiẽkti 'to serve (a dish)'); vèsti 'to lead; to marry' vedi̇̀mas (a noun for an action) vẽdamas (participle) 'who is being led; married'; baltinỹs 'cloth which is being whitened', balti̇̀nis 'white; (dial.) white of the egg' (derivatives from baltas 'white').

Variation in sounds takes place in word formation. Some examples:

infinitive	present tense, I person, singular	past tense, I person, singular	a noun of an action	other noun	related short nouns	related short adjectives	meaning (for an infinitive)
rasti	randu I am finding; I find	radau I found	radimas a finding				to find (notice)
busti	bundu	budau	budimas			budrus vigilant	to wake
pulti	puolu	puoliau	puolimas		pulkas a regiment		to begin (on) suddenly; to attack; to descend
pilti	pilu	pyliau	pylimas	pylimas a mound, an embankment	pilis a castle pilvas a belly	pilnas full	to pour (any non solid material e.g. water, sand)
kilti	kylu	kilau	kilimas		kelias a road kelis a knee kalva a hill kalnas a mountain	kilnus noble	to arise, lift (for oneself); to emerge, start; to grow, get bigger
kelti	keliu	kėliau	kėlimas		kelias a road kelis a knee kalva a hill kalnas a mountain		to raise, lift (something), to wake somebody else; to improve
svirti	svyru	svirau	svirimas				to slope
sverti	sveriu	svėriau	svėrimas		svoris a weight		to weigh
gerti	geriu	gėriau	gėrimas	gėrimas a drink, a beverage			to drink
durti	duriu	dūriau	dūrimas				to prickle, job
vyti	veju	vijau	vijimas		vytis a chaser pavojus a danger, alert		to chase; to strand, wind
visti	vysta (III p.)	viso (III p.)	visimas			visas visàs – all (feminine), vi̇̀sas – whole (masculine)	to breed (for oneself)
veisti	veisiu	veisiau	veisimas		vaisius a fruit vaistas a drug		to rear, to breed (something)
vysti	vystu (I p.) vysta (III p.)	vytau (I p.) vyto (III p.)	vytimas				to fade, wither, languish

The examples in the table are given as an overview, the word formation comprises many words not given here, for example, any verb can have an adjective made by the same pattern: sverti – svarus 'valid; ponderous'; svirti – svarùs 'slopable'; vyti – vajùs 'for whom it is characteristic to chase or to be chased'; pilti – pilùs 'poury'; but for example visti – vislùs 'prolific' (not visus, which could conflict with an adjective of a similar form visas 'all, entire, whole'). Many verbs, besides a noun derivative with the ending -i̇̀mas, can have different derivatives of the same meaning: pilti – pyli̇̀mas, pylà, pỹlis (they mean the act of the verb: a pouring (of any non solid material)); the first two have meanings that look almost identical but are drawn apart from a direct link with the verb: pylimas 'a bank, an embankment', pylà 'pelting; spanking, whipping'; the word svõris 'a weight', for example, does not have the meaning of an act of weighing. There are also many other derivatives and patterns of derivation.

== See also ==
- Lithuanian orthography
- Lithuanian grammar

== Bibliography ==
- Ambrazas, Vytautas; Geniušienė, Emma; Girdenis, Aleksas; Sližienė, Nijolė; Valeckienė, Adelė; Valiulytė, Elena; Tekorienė, Dalija; Pažūsis, Lionginas (1997). Ambrazas, Vytautas (ed.). Lithuanian Grammar. Vilnius: Institute of the Lithuanian Language. ISBN 9986-813-22-0.
- Augustaitis, Daine (1964). Das litauische Phonationssystem (in German). Munich: Sagner.
- Ladefoged, Peter; Maddieson, Ian (1996). The Sounds of the World's Languages. Oxford: Blackwell. ISBN 0-631-19815-6.
- Laver, John (1994). Principles of Phonetics. Cambridge: Cambridge University Press. ISBN 0-521-45655-X.
- Mathiassen, Terje (1996). A Short Grammar of Lithuanian. Slavica Publishers. ISBN 978-0893572679.
- Pakerys, Antanas (1995). Lietuvių bendrinės kalbos fonetika (in Lithuanian). Vilnius: Žara. OCLC 911717523.
