= Nusidavimai apie evangelijos prasiplatinimą tarp žydų ir pagonių =

Nusidavimai Nuſiẟawimai
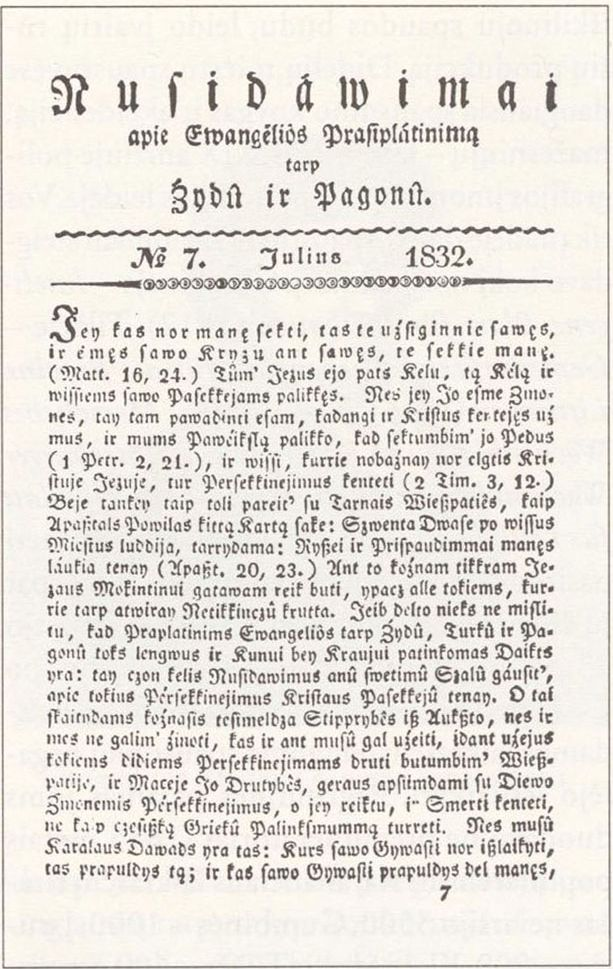
- First page of 7th edition, 1832
- Type: Monthly newspaper
- Format: various
- Editor-in-chief: Benjaminas K. Redmeris (last)
- Founded: January 1832; 194 years ago
- Ceased publication: August 1914; 111 years ago
- Relaunched: briefly in 1921
- Political alignment: Evangelical Christianity
- Headquarters: Königsberg, later Klaipėda
- Circulation: ~500
- Sister newspapers: Nusidavimai Dievo karalystėje Königsberger Missionsblatt

Nusidavimai apie evangelijos prasiplatinimą tarp žydų ir pagonių (lit. 'Stories about the Propagation of the Gospel among the Jews and the Pagans', original spelling Nuſiẟawimai apie Evangëliös Praſiplátinimą tarp Ʒyẟû ir Pagonû) was the second Lithuanian-language periodical. It was published from 1832 to August 1914 in Königsberg, East Prussia, by the Evangelical Missionary Society of Königsberg and mainly reported on Evangelical missions in Asia, Africa, South America. It was discontinued due to the outbreak of World War I.

== History ==
Nusidavimai Dievo karalystėje (News in the Kingdom of God) was the first Lithuanian periodical, but it is known only from later references in other texts as there are no known surviving copies of the publications. It was published annually in 1823–1824/1825 in Tilsit (present-day Sovetsk, Kaliningrad Oblast) by the Evangelical Missionary Society of Königsberg (German: Evangelischer Missionsverein zu Königsberg) established in January 1822. It was a translation of German Königsberger Missionsblatt edited by Hermann Olshausen which reported on the Evangelical missions in Asia and Africa and organized collections of donations. The translations were done by Natanel Friedrich Ostermeyer, Lutheran priest in Kallningken (present-day Prochladnoje). Researchers believe that the publication was initiated by Ludwig Rhesa who was a board member of the Missionary Society. The first issue introduced the Missionary Society and published articles on the lives of Saints Thomas the Apostle and Martin of Tours as well as letters from the missionaries. The circulation was likely around 300–500 copies. The publication was discontinued due to lack of readers, but resumed in 1832 as Nusidavimai apie evangelijos....

Nusidavimai apie evangelijos... was published in 1832–1834 and 1837–1914, and briefly revived in 1921 by the Evangelical Society Gluosnis in Klaipėda. In 1832 and from around 1865, it was published monthly. In other years, it appeared on average about three times a year. The circulation was about 400 to 500 copies. Initially, it was distributed by members of the Missionary Society and various priests; from 1869, it was delivered via the Reichspost. From 1843, for some time, the language was edited and corrected by linguist Friedrich Kurschat. It mainly published translated texts from Königsberger Missionsblatt – primarily letters from the missionaries, but also included some ethnographic or historical information about the peoples that the missionaries worked with and other religious texts. On occasion, it published original texts about local issues of Prussian Lithuanians, such as the status of the Lithuanian language, emigration to the United States, children's education. In 1876, it published a map of Western Europe and Africa with labels in Lithuanian – the first map in Lithuanian.

== Editors ==
The editors of Nusidavimai apie evangelijos... were Lutheran priests:

- Johann Ferdinand Kelch (Johanas Ferdinandas Kelkis) from Alt Inse (Prichaly) and Deutsch Crottingen (Kretingalė) – 1832–1867?
- Karl Leopold Friedrich Neiss (Karolis Leopoldas Neisas) from Kaukehmen (Yasnoye) – 1867?–1873
- Christoph Sturies (Kristupas Sturys) from Kaukehmen – 1873–1886
- Christoph Jurkschat (Kristupas Jurkšaitis) from Saugen (Saugos) – 1886–1888?
- Janis Pipirs (Jonas Pipiras) from Memel (Klaipėda) – 1888?–1889
- Friedrich Penschuck (Friedrichas Penčiukas) from Dorf Mehlauken (Zalesye) – 1889–1901
- Endrikis Endrulaitis from Schakuhnen (Levoberezhnoye) and Prökuls (Priekulė) – 1901–1906
- Mikelis Šuišelis from Nattkischken (Natkiškiai) – 1907–1914
- Benjaminas K. Redmeris from Memel (Klaipėda) – 1921
