= Friedrich Kurschat =

Prussian linguist (1806–1884)

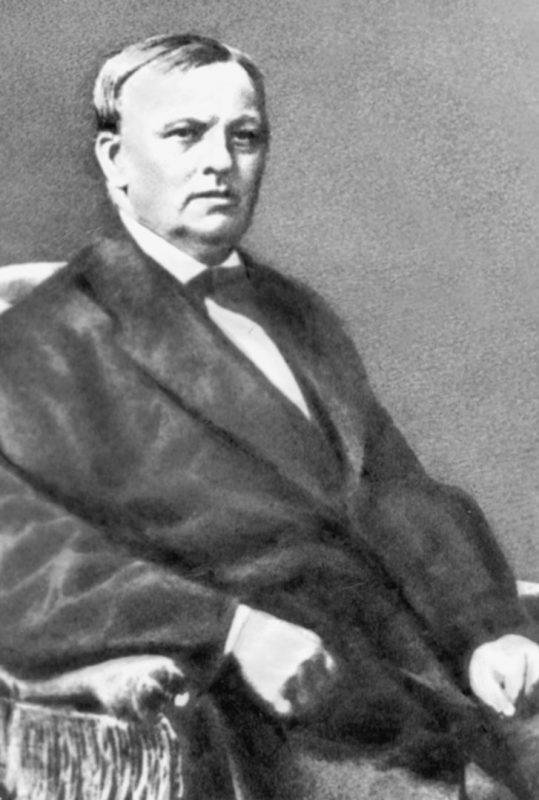
- Born: 24 April 1806; Noragehlen (now in Slavsky District), (Note: The village was known in Lithuanian as Noragėliai and was renamed to Urbansprind in 1938. It was located about 3 kilometres (1.9 mi) east of Slavsk at 55°03′00″N 21°42′52″E) East Prussia, Kingdom of Prussia
- Died: 23 August 1884 (aged 78); Cranz, East Prussia, Kingdom of Prussia, German Empire
- Burial place: Königsberg
- Education: University of Königsberg
- Occupations: Linguist, university professor, translator, newspaper editor, Lutheran priest
- Notable work: Grammatik der littauischen Sprache (1876)

Friedrich Kurschat (Lithuanian: Frydrichas Kuršaitis; 24 April 1806 – 23 August 1884) was a Prussian Lithuanian linguist and professor at the University of Königsberg. He studied the Lithuanian language and published its grammar in 1876 in which he was the first to describe Lithuanian accentuation in detail.

Kurschat was born into a family of a poor school teacher and received no formal education until age 28. In 1836, he enrolled into the University of Königsberg where he became an assistant to linguist Ludwig Rhesa. After Rhesa's death in 1840, Kurschat became the leader of the Lithuanian language seminar at the university and held that position for more than forty years. He graduated in 1844 and was ordained as a Lutheran priest.

Kurschat published several linguistic studies of the Lithuanian language. His most important work was the grammar of the Lithuanian language published in 1876. He also published two-volume German–Lithuanian dictionary and one-volume Lithuanian–German dictionary. Kurschat was an active translator and editor of various religious texts, including the official edition of hymnal, Lithuanian translation of the Bible, and Luther's Small Catechism. In total, he published about 30 Lithuanian books. During the German revolutions of 1848–1849, Kurschat established a conservative Lithuanian weekly Keleivis (Traveler) and edited it until February 1880. It was one of the first Lithuanian periodicals.

== Biography ==
Friedrich Kurschat was born on 24 April 1806 into a family of a school teacher. He was the eldest of eight children and received his first education at his father's school. In 1822, priest Meyer from Neukirch (now Timiryazevo) hired Kurschat as an assistant and a tutor for his children. With Meyer's help, in 1824, Kurschat became a second teacher at the primary school in Neukirch even though he had no formal education. He later moved to teach in Heinrichswalde (now Slavsk) where he earned just 70 Prussian thalers a year and to Kalthof (now Rizhskoye). At age 28, having saved a hundred thalers, Kurschat enrolled into a gymnasium in Elbląg.

After the graduation in 1836, he enrolled into the University of Königsberg to study theology. Since 1718, students who were to become pastors in parishes inhabited by Prussian Lithuanians had to take a seminar on the Lithuanian language. At the time, the seminar was taught by Ludwig Rhesa. As Kurschat was fluent in Lithuanian and a diligent student, he became assistant to Rhesa who was elderly and of increasingly poor health. When Russian philologist Pyotr Preis arrived to Königsberg to learn Lithuanian, Rhesa recommended Kurschat as his teacher. Kurschat's studies were interrupted by an illness and he worked for a year as a teacher in Tragheim. Kurschat graduated from the university and was ordained as a priest in 1844. He was assigned as a chaplain of Lithuanian-speaking soldiers.

After Rhesa's death in 1840, Kurschat, while still a student, became the leader of the Lithuanian language seminar and held that position for more than forty years. Only old age forced him to retire in 1883. He substantially improved the quality of the seminar and published two booklets for its attendees in 1843 and 1849. He also offered the seminar to all students of the university, not just those studying theology. The seminar was an elective that lasted three years. Kurschat increased the number of weekly hours by adding a course on Lithuanian grammar and a reading of The Seasons by Kristijonas Donelaitis. To further study the Lithuanian language, he visited Lithuania (then part of the Russian Empire) in 1872, 1874 and 1875. He visited several Lithuanian activists, including Motiejus Valančius and Antanas Baranauskas. Kurschat was recognized as a professor in 1865 and as honorary PhD in 1875. In 1882, he was selected as an honorary member of the Royal Bohemian Society of Sciences.

Kurschat ran in the 1874 elections to the German Reichstag as a candidate of the Prussian Conservative Party but received only 147 votes out of 5,748. He was similarly unsuccessful in the 1879 elections to the Landtag of Prussia. (Note: Mykolas Biržiška in Aleksandrynas also provides that Kurschat similarly unsuccessfully ran in the 1871 elections to the Reichstag, but this information cannot be verified.) Politically, Kurschat was very conservative. He promoted Lutheran religious ideals and supported the German Empire and the Kings of Prussia while criticizing "democratic vomit" directed at them. He did not believe in the future of Prussian Lithuanians and did not campaign against Germanization. He believed that the Lithuanian language was destined for extinction and hurried to record it for future studies.

Kurschat married in 1848, but had no children. He used spent his summers in Cranz (present-day Zelenogradsk) where he died on 23 August 1884. He was buried four days later in Königsberg, but his grave has not survived.

== Works ==
=== Language studies ===
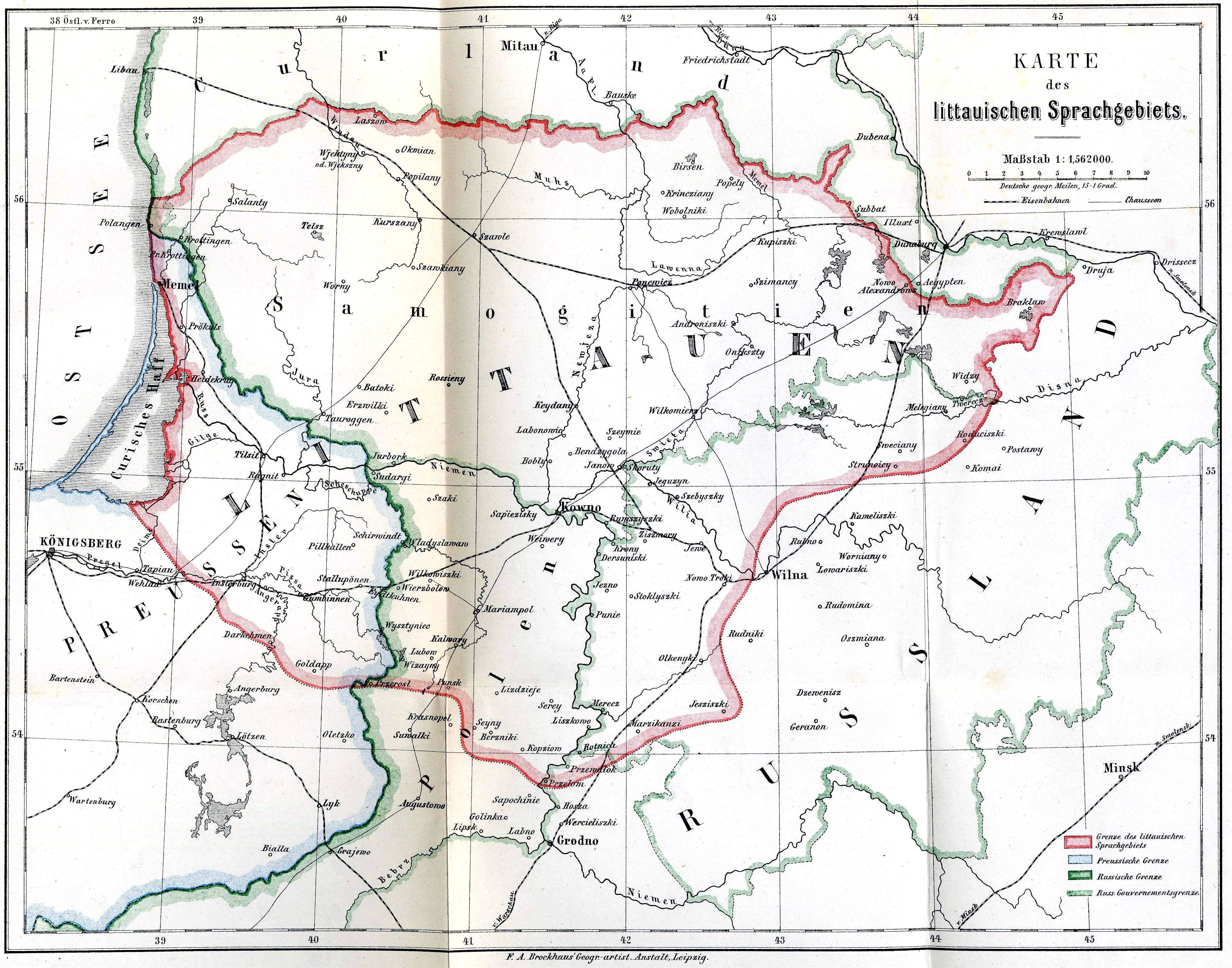
Map of the area where Lithuanian is spoken included in Kurschat's grammar

Kurschat published his studies of the Lithuanian language in German.

Already in 1843, Kurschat published a booklet (Beiträge zur Kunde der littauischen Sprache) for the attendees of the Lithuanian language seminar. It contained an alphabetical list of most common German prepositional phrases and their Lithuanian equivalents. It was followed by a second booklet in 1849 which discussed Lithuanian accentuation. It was a much more substantial study peer-reviewed by August Friedrich Pott and praised by Holger Pedersen.

In 1876, Kurschat published his most important work – 476-page grammar of the Lithuanian language. It substantially improved the earlier grammar by August Schleicher published in 1856 and remained as the most complete and authoritative grammar until Jonas Jablonskis published his grammar in 1901. Kurschat did not have a strong linguistic education (he studied theology at the university) and therefore was not as technically strong as Schleicher. However, as a native speaker, Kurschat had much better command and understanding of Lithuanian and could provide much more detail than Schleicher. Kurschat's grammar discussed the relationship between Lithuanian and other Indo-European languages, included a map where Lithuanian was spoken, characterized Lithuanian dialects, described Lithuanian phonetics, word formation, and syntax, provided ample new examples (mostly from his native dialect), and for the first time discussed accentology in great detail. Stress marks introduced in this grammar are still used in modern texts on Lithuanian accentuation. Kurschat was not familiar with Universitas lingvarum Litvaniae, which was published in 1737 and briefly discussed Lithuanian accentuation, and came to his conclusions independently. The work also included a chapter on Lithuanian folk songs with sample lyrics of 25 songs. The grammar was influential and was used by many activists of the Lithuanian National Revival. In particular, the grammar was the main source of information on Lithuanian for Ferdinand de Saussure, one of the founders of semiotics, who studied Lithuanian accentuation and formulated the Fortunatov–de Saussure law. The grammar was translated and published in Lithuanian in 2013.

In 1846, a group of linguists decided to publish a Lithuanian dictionary. For the task they selected not a new graduate Kurschat but professor Georg Heinrich Ferdinand Nesselmann. The dictionary was published in 1851 and at the time it was the most extensive dictionary of Lithuanian. Undeterred, Kurschat collected lexicographical data for about three decades and prepared two-volume German–Lithuanian dictionary. Printing of the dictionary started in 1866, but Kurschat did not have sufficient funds. He was able to get some government assistance from Prussia and from Austria-Hungary (which purchased 50 copies of the dictionary for its libraries). After additional delays due to the Franco-Prussian War, the first volume was published in 1870 and the second in 1874. Event though the dictionary was expensive (unbound copy sold for 27 German marks), Kurschat did not earn any money from the publication. Kurschat then published one-volume Lithuanian–German dictionary with about 20,000 headwords in 1883. Due to increasingly poor health, the last dictionary was not as extensive as first envisioned. Kurschat's nephew, linguist Alexander Theodor Kurschat, helped edit and publish the last volume. All words in the dictionary have stress marks. It limited itself to words collected from Prussian Lithuanians and from published Lithuanian works. In collecting the data, Kurschat was assisted by other priests and Lithuanian activists. Words that Kurschat could not attest from personal experience were written in square brackets, a unique feature highly valued by modern researchers. The dictionaries are the most important and extensive source on the language of Prussian Lithuanians and most of their data was incorporated into the 20-volume Academic Dictionary of Lithuanian.

Both the grammar and the dictionaries were published by the printing press of the Francke Foundations.

=== Religious texts ===
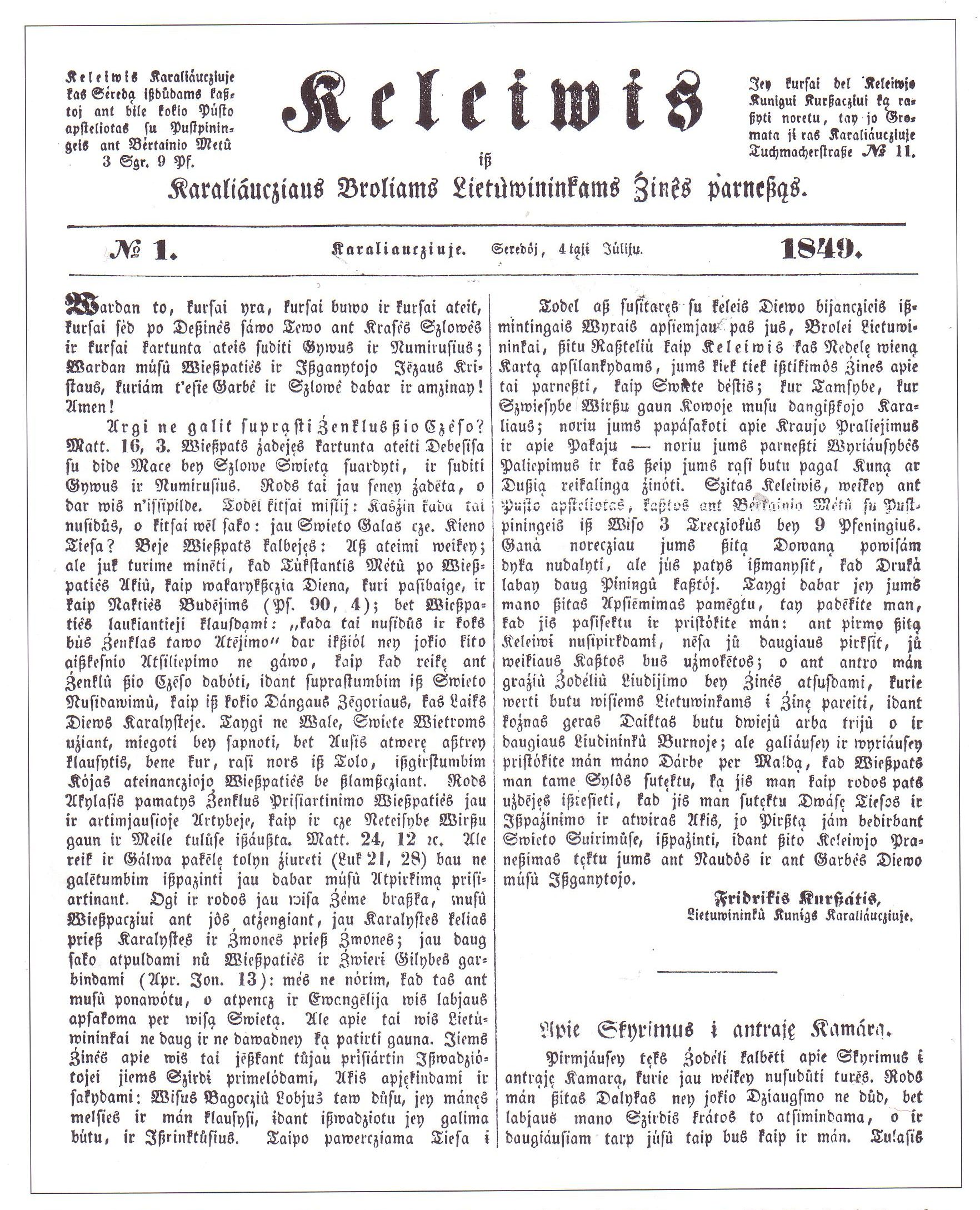
First issue of Keleivis in 1849

Kurschat edited and published numerous religious texts in Lithuanian. These texts were not original texts by Kurschat, but new translations, corrections, and edits of various other texts. In total, Kurschat published about 30 Lithuanian books.

In 1841, he edited the official 790-page hymnal which also included edited hymns first published by Daniel Klein in 1666. This hymnal saw its 38th edition in 1917. He later published smaller hymnals: 64 hymns with 16 sheet music in 1853, a prayer book with 150 hymns in 1854, and 98 hymns for soldiers and students in 1857 (it was republished 25 times). In 1841, he also published a new translation of the Luther's Small Catechism written by D. Weiss (it was republished in 1845 and 1865). In 1852, he published a new translation of The Holy War by John Bunyan.

In 1858, Kurschat prepared a new edition of the Bible translation into Lithuanian. This Bible was first translated and published in 1735 and Kurschat edited and corrected it based on German and Greek translations.

=== Other publications ===
In 1843, while still a university student, Kurschat published a new edition of a collection of Lithuanian folk songs (Dainos oder Litthauische Volkslieder) collected and first published by Ludwig Rhesa in 1825. In 1844, he translated and published a booklet about the harms of alcohol and promoting the temperance movement by the German pastor Johann Heinrich Böttcher.

During the German revolutions of 1848–1849, Kurschat was approached by a German general to start a conservative Lithuanian periodical. Receiving funds from the Prussian government, Kurschat established weekly Keleivis (Traveler) in July 1849 and edited it until February 1880. Most of the content was written by Kurschat. It was one of the first Lithuanian periodicals. Keleivis was discontinued in 1880 but quickly revived as Naujasis keleivis and then as Tilžės keleivis which continued to be published until 1924.

For some time, Kurschat corrected language of Nusidavimai apie evangelijos prasiplatinimą tarp žydų ir pagonių, a monthly Lithuanian periodical reporting mainly on Evangelical missions in Asia, Africa, and South America.
