= Kretingalė =

- Town
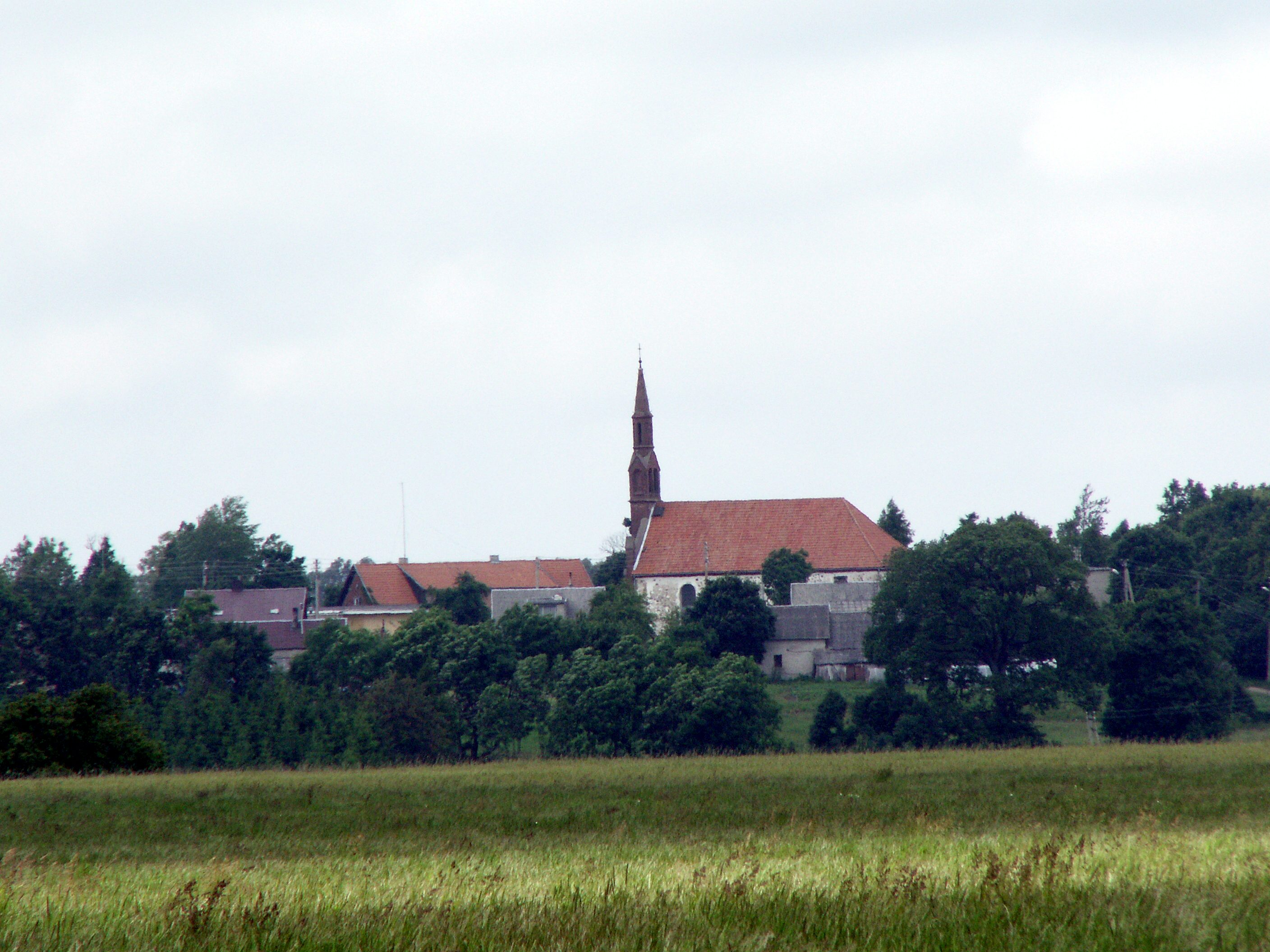

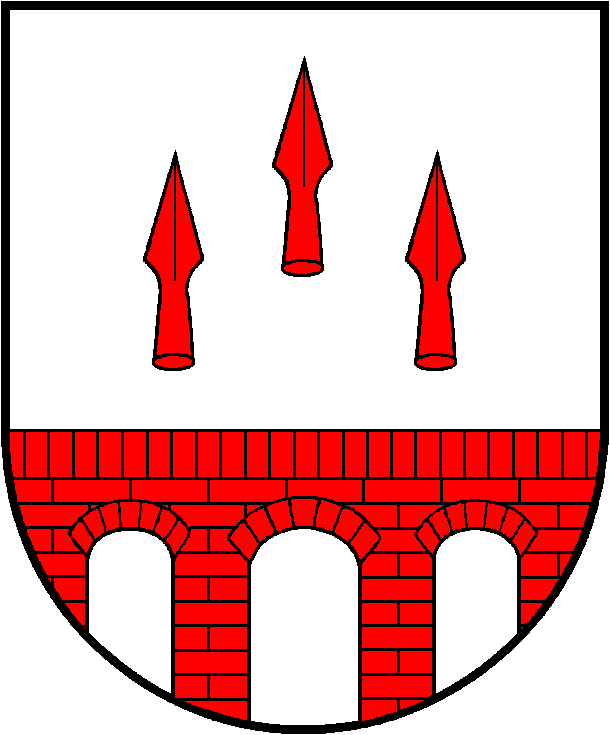
- Coat of arms

- Location within Lithuania
- Coordinates: 55°50′10″N 21°11′10″E
- Country: Lithuania
- County: Klaipėda County
- Municipality: Klaipėda District Municipality

Population (2021)
  - Total: 1,047
- Time zone: UTC+2 (EET)
  - Summer (DST): UTC+3 (EEST)

Kretingalė (German: Deutsch Crottingen; Polish: Krotynga) is a small town in Klaipėda County, in northwestern Lithuania. According to the 2011 census, the town has a population of 936 people. It is located 14 km northeast of Klaipėda and 7 km southwest of Kretinga.

== History ==
The town is located in the historic region of Lithuania Minor. Since the Treaty of Melno in 1422, the town was located on the border between the State of the Teutonic Order and the Grand Duchy of Lithuania and their respective successors. In 1454, King Casimir IV Jagiellon incorporated the region to the Kingdom of Poland upon the request of the Prussian Confederation – a league formed in opposition to the Teutonic Order. After the subsequent Thirteen Years' War (1454–1466) the Teutonic Order regained authority over the settlement as a fief of the Polish Crown. From the 18th century, it was part of the Kingdom of Prussia, and from 1871 it was also part of Germany, located on its border with Russia following the Partitions of the Polish–Lithuanian Commonwealth. In the late 19th century, the village had a solely Lithuanian population of population of 170. Three annual fairs were held in the village in the late 19th century.

After World War I according to the Treaty of Versailles in 1920, it was ceded by Germany as part of the Memelland (Klaipėda Region) and in 1923, it was annexed by Lithuania, to which it has belonged since, except for 1939–1945 when it was occupied by Nazi Germany.
